= Samuel Dexter Lecompte =

American jurist (1814–1888)

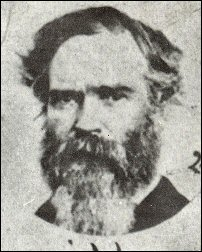

Chief Justice of the Supreme Court of the Kansas Territory
- In office October 3, 1854 – March 9, 1859
- Nominated by: Franklin Pierce
- Preceded by: Office established
- Succeeded by: John Pettit

Personal details
- Born: December 13, 1814 Cambridge, Maryland, US
- Died: April 24, 1888 (aged 73) Kansas City, Missouri, US
- Spouse: Camilla Anderson (m. 1841)
- Children: 5

Samuel Dexter Lecompte (December 13, 1814 – April 24, 1888) was an American jurist best known for his extreme pro-slavery views, his involvement in the events of Bleeding Kansas, and for being the founder and namesake of Lecompton, the erstwhile capital of the Kansas Territory.

== Biography ==
=== Early life ===
Lecompte was born in Dorchester County, Maryland on December 13, 1814. He attended Kenyon College and subsequently graduated from Jefferson College (now Washington & Jefferson College) in 1834. Afterward, he was admitted to the bar in the state of Maryland, practicing law in Westminster before being elected to the Maryland General Assembly in 1840. He practiced law in Dorchester County until 1854, when he moved to Baltimore, opening his law practice there at 10 Court House Lane.

=== Kansas ===
Upon the passage of the Kansas–Nebraska Act on May 30, 1854, President Franklin Pierce appointed Lecompte to the position of Chief Justice of the Supreme Court of the newly organized Kansas Territory. Upon arriving in Kansas, he, alongside Daniel Woodson, sponsored the foundation of the proslavery stronghold of Lecompton, which was named after him by his supporters. Lecompton was named the capital of Kansas Territory by the Bogus Legislature on August 8, 1855, after Pawnee's bid was sabotaged by Woodson and his proslavery allies, who objected to Pawnee's distance from the critical Missouri bases of the Border Ruffians, and sought to gain financially from naming a city whose land they controlled.

Upon the bloodless resolution of the Wakarusa War in December 1855 between pro- and anti-slavery settlers, Congress appointed three representatives to the newly created "Committee to Investigate the Troubles in Kansas". They were: John Sherman of Ohio, William Alanson Howard of Michigan, and Mordecai Oliver of Missouri. They held their first hearing in Lecompton on April 21, 1856, and held more hearings in Lawrence and Leavenworth, with each hearing lasting ten hours.

Matters in Kansas were further complicated by the formation of a rival government under the free-state (anti-slavery) Topeka Constitution in January 1856, and so there existed, concurrently, two rival Governors of Kansas: the proslavery Wilson Shannon, based in Lecompton and recognized by the Federal Government, and the free-stater Charles L. Robinson, based in Lawrence and seen by President Pierce as the leader of a "treasonable insurrection".

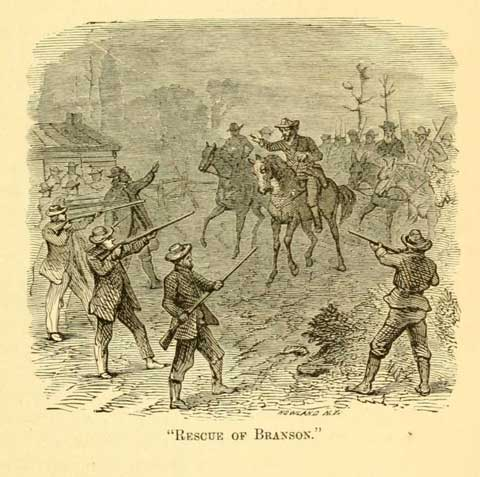
The "Rescue of Branson", which was used to justify the Sack of Lawrence.

Accordingly, Lecompte surprised the Committee by convening, on May 5, 1856, a grand jury which resulted in the indictment of all members of the "Topeka Government" on charges of treason, and arresting Governor Robinson while he was traveling by steamboat in Lexington, Missouri. On May 11, Federal Marshal Israel B. Donaldson proclaimed that the hindrance of an attempted arrest in Lawrence the previous November, an event known as the "Rescue of Branson" (which was the primary cause of the Wakarusa War), was a violent act of insurrection, and that the Free State Hotel in Lawrence was used as a "fort", and thus took this as an excuse to gather armed proslavery settlers in Lecompton in preparation of a raid on Lawrence.

The mob, now consisting of between 500 and 800 men, encamped outside Lawrence on May 20. Deputy Marshal W. P. Fain entered Lawrence with 8 men and served the indictment papers without incident, and disbanded the posse. However, Sheriff Samuel J. Jones reconvened it as a sheriff's posse and, under the pretext of "abating nuisances by order of [Lecompte's] grand jury", raided the town a day later in what became known as the Sack of Lawrence. The presses of two abolitionist papers, the Kansas Free-State and the Herald of Freedom, were destroyed. The Free State Hotel, where the Committee had convened hearings, was seen by the proslavery camp at large as a symbol of abolitionism, and thus was destroyed by the Lecompte mob under the direction of Sheriff Samuel J. Jones, who was shot in Lawrence by persons unknown the previous month and thus held a personal vendetta against the town. The Hotel was bombarded by three cannons and a powder keg was detonated inside, and when that failed to damage the structure, it was burned down, but not before the rooms and the liquor stock were ransacked by the attackers. The house of Governor Robinson was also destroyed.

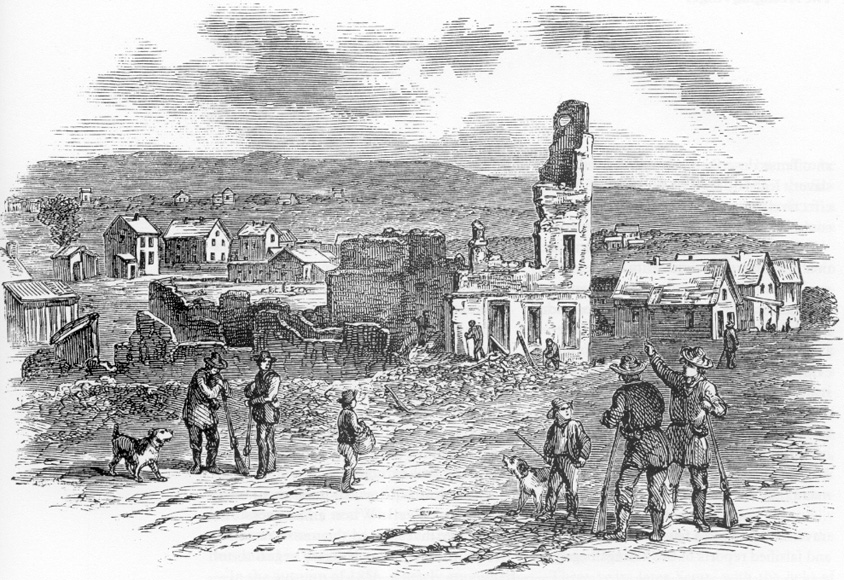
The charred remains of the Free State Hotel.

Lecompte would later write in 1875 a lengthy defense of his actions. In this article, published in the Kansas Chief, Lecompte denies any wrongdoing or partisanship during the Kansas crisis, and especially denies the claim that he ordered the destruction of the Free State Hotel, since Sheriff Jones was widely quoted to have shouted during the raid that his actions were by the order of Lecompte's court.

In late 1856, the new Governor John Geary clashed with Lecompte and attempted to have him removed as Chief Justice. He succeeded in having President Pierce name C. O. Harrison, a Kentuckian, as a successor to Lecompte on December 10. Geary wrote to Pierce:

the removal of Donaldson [sic], Clark [sic], and Lecompte has been received here with general acclamation by the people, and men recently disposed to vilify and abuse you are loud in your praise.

However, Pierce failed to officially remove Lecompte from office, which stopped the Senate ratifying the nomination, and thus Geary's attempt to remove Lecompte failed.

=== Later career ===
Lecompte remained loyal to the Union during the Civil War. He resumed his law practice in Leavenworth, where he later served as a Leavenworth County probate judge for 4 years. He served in the Kansas Legislature for Leavenworth as a Democrat from 1867 to 1868, when he joined the Republican Party during the 1868 election, and was named chairman of the local Republican congressional committee on April 15, 1874.

== Proslavery views ==
Lecompte was considered a passionate proslavery extremist. He was described by historian Allan Nevins as a "bibulous, hot-tempered partisan" for the cause of slavery. Sol Miller, the editor of the Troy Kansas Chief newspaper, said in 1874 that Lecompte was the judge "the very mention of whose name, less than twenty years ago, caused a shudder everywhere in the Free States". Lecompte is quoted as saying:

To the charge of a pro-slavery bias, I am proud, too, of this. I am the steady friend of Southern rights under the constitution of the United States. I have been reared where slavery was recognized by the constitution of my state. I love the institution as entwining itself around all my early and late associations.

Lecompte was active in the slave trade in Maryland, buying and selling chattel on behalf of his clients. He is recorded to have owned two slave women when he moved to Kansas. So deep was his commitment to slavery that, when swearing in new lawyers in his capacity as a Chief Justice in Kansas, he made them swear allegiance to the Kansas–Nebraska Act and the Fugitive Slave Act instead of the United States Constitution.

== Personal life and death ==
He was married on April 28, 1841, to Camilla Anderson. They had five children.

Lecompte spent his later years defending his actions during his tenure in the Kansas Supreme Court, writing letters to newspapers, including a lengthy defense of his actions relating to the sack of Lawrence, and filing a libel lawsuit against Daniel Read Anthony, one of his critics. Lecompte refused to supply the Kansas Historical Society with an image of himself, fearing that it would be used in a negative context.

Lecompte died on April 24, 1888, in the home of his son, J. T. Lecompte, at 1224 Campbell street, Kansas City, Missouri.

== See also ==
- Bleeding Kansas
- Sack of Lawrence
- Samuel J. Jones
