= Pottawatomie Rifles =

Militant group of abolitionist settlers in the Kansas Territory, USA (1850s)

The Pottawatomie Rifles was a group of about one hundred abolitionist (or free state) settlers of Franklin and Anderson County, Kansas, both of which are along Pottawatomie Creek. The band was formed in the fall of 1855, during the Bleeding Kansas period, as an armed militia to counter growing pro-slavery presence: an influx of men known as border ruffians, from the neighboring slave state of Missouri.

Led by John Brown's son John Jr., men from the Pottawatomie Rifles took part in much of the violence known as Bleeding Kansas, including the Battle of Osawatomie and the Pottawatomie massacre. Although John Brown, who was famous for his own raids, such as the raid on Harpers Ferry, frequently accompanied his son, he did not consider himself a member of the group.

== Pottawatomie massacre ==
The Pottawatomie massacre took place during the night between May 24 and 25, 1856. In revenge for the sacking of Lawrence, Kansas, by pro-slavery forces, in which the Douglas County Sheriff Samuel Jones led a mob that trashed newspaper offices and the Free State Hotel, John Brown and various other abolitionist settlers and abolitionist groups, most of whom were Pottawatomie Rifles, killed five pro-slavery settlers. The incident occurred north of Pottawatomie Creek, near its junction to Mosquito Creek, in Franklin County, Kansas. Some sources say that John Brown Sr. led the massacre, beginning from May 22, in a private expedition which consisted of his sons Oliver, Watson, Owen, and Frederick, his son-in-law Henry Thompson, and two men named James Townsley and Thomas Winer who were transporting the men in their wagons, but not his son John Jr.
