= List of battles fought in Kansas =

This is an incomplete list of military and other armed confrontations that have occurred within the boundaries of the modern US State of Kansas since European contact. The region was part of the Viceroyalty of New Spain from 1535–1679, New France from 1679–1803, and part of the United States of America 1803–present. A small portion of the southwest part of the state—southwest of the Arkansas River was claimed by the Republic of Texas after the Texas Revolution.

Two wars have directly affected the region, the American Civil War (1860–1865) and the Plains Indian Wars. Kansas was also greatly affected during the Bleeding Kansas period (1855–1861) in which settlers and outsiders fought to determine whether the territory would become a free or slave state.

== Battles ==
Name	Date	Location	War	Campaign	Dead	Belligerents
Battle at Etzanoa	September 1601	modern Arkansas City, Kansas			unknown	Escanxaque vs. New Spain
Battle of Chouteau's Island	Spring 1816	near modern Lakin, Kansas			8	Pawnee vs. French fur traders
Love's Defeat	June 26, 1847	near modern Garfield, Kansas	Mexican–American War		6	United States vs. Kiowa & Comanche
Battle of Coon Creek	June 18, 1848	near modern Kinsley, Kansas	Mexican–American War			United States vs. Comanche & Osage
Wakarusa War	November–December 1855	Lawrence, Kansas / Wakarusa River Valley	Bleeding Kansas		2	Free-Staters vs. Border Ruffians
Sacking of Lawrence	May 21, 1856	Lawrence, Kansas	Bleeding Kansas		1	Pro-slavery mob vs. abolitionist civilians
Pottawatomie massacre	May 24–25, 1856	Franklin County, Kansas	Bleeding Kansas		5	Free-Staters vs. Pro-slavery settlers
Battle of Black Jack	June 2, 1856	near modern Baldwin City, Kansas	Bleeding Kansas			Border Ruffians vs. Free-Staters
Battle of Fort Titus	August 16, 1856	Douglas County, Kansas	Bleeding Kansas		3	Free-Staters vs. Border Ruffians
Battle of Osawatomie	August 30, 1856	Osawatomie, Kansas	Bleeding Kansas		25+	Border Ruffians vs. Free-Staters
Battle of Solomon's Fork	July 29, 1857	near modern Morland, Kansas	Plains Indians Wars		10–11	United States vs. Northern Cheyenne
Battle of Indian Rock	1857	within modern Salina	Territorial dispute			Northern Cheyenne vs. Delaware, Kaw, and Pottawatomi
Marais des Cygnes massacre	May 19, 1858	Trading Post, Kansas	Bleeding Kansas		5	Border Ruffians vs. Free-Staters
Battle of the Spurs	January 31, 1859	near modern Netawaka, Kansas	Bleeding Kansas	Underground Railroad	0	John Brown, J. H. Kagi, Aaron Dwight Stevens & escaped slaves vs. U.S. marshals
Lawrence Massacre	August 21, 1863	Lawrence, Kansas	American Civil War	Quantrill's Raid	150+	United States & Kansas militia vs. Confederate States of America
Fort Baxter Massacre	October 6, 1863	near modern Baxter Springs, Kansas	American Civil War	Quantrill's Raid	100+	United States vs. Confederate States of America
Battle of Marais des Cygnes	October 25, 1864	Linn County, Kansas	American Civil War	Price's Raid	unknown	United States vs. Confederate States of America
Battle of Mine Creek	October 25, 1864	Linn County, Kansas	American Civil War	Price's Raid		United States vs. Confederate States of America
Battle of Cow Creek	June 11, 1865	near modern Alden, Kansas	Plains Indian Wars		15+	Company I, 2nd Colorado Cavalry & Company G, 7th Iowa Cavalry vs Kiowa (likely)
Battle of Lookout Station	April 15, 1867	near modern Antonino, Kansas	Plains Indian Wars		2	Lakota & Southern Cheyenne vs. civilians
Fort Wallace	June 21, 1867	modern Wallace, Kansas	Plains Indian Wars	Comanche Campaign	28	United States vs. Arapaho, Comanche, Kiowa, & Southern Cheyenne
Fort Wallace	June 26, 1867	modern Wallace, Kansas	Plains Indian Wars	Comanche Campaign	1	United States vs. Arapaho, Comanche, Kiowa, & Southern Cheyenne
Kidder Massacre	July 2, 1867	near modern Goodland, Kansas	Plains Indian Wars		12	United States vs. Northern Cheyenne & Sioux
Battle of the Saline River	August 2, 1867	modern Ellis County, Kansas	Plains Indian Wars	Comanche Campaign	31+	United States vs. Southern Cheyenne
Battle of Prairie Dog Creek	August 21, 1867	modern Phillips County, Kansas	Plains Indian Wars	Comanche Campaign	53	United States vs. Kiowa & Southern Cheyenne
(1st) Battle of Beaver Creek	August 22–23, 1867	modern Phillips County, Kansas	Plains Indian Wars	Comanche Campaign	2+	18th Kansas Cavalry vs. Kiowa & Southern Cheyenne
Plum Buttes Massacre	September 9, 1867	near modern Chase, Kansas	Plains Indian Wars		3	Dog Soldiers vs. Santa Fe Trail party
Battle of Council Grove	June 3, 1868	near Council Grove, Kansas	Plains Indian Wars		3	Southern Cheyenne vs. Kaw
(2nd) Battle of Beaver Creek (2)	October 15, 1868	modern Phillips County, Kansas	Plains Indian Wars	Comanche Campaign	unknown	10th US Cavalry H & I Troops vs. Southern Cheyenne
Battle of Buff Creek	October 2, 1868	modern Wallace, Kansas	Plains Indian Wars	Comanche Campaign	1	United States vs. Arapaho, Comanche, Kiowa, & Southern Cheyenne
Battle of Punished Woman Fork	September 27, 1878	modern Scott County, Kansas	Plains Indian Wars		1	United States vs. Southern Cheyenne
Coffeyville bank robbery	October 5, 1892	Coffeyville, Kansas			8	city law enforcement & citizens vs Dalton Gang

== See also ==
- History of Kansas
- Kansas in the American Civil War
- Plains Indians Wars
