= Battle of Osawatomie =

1856 battle of the Bleeding Kansas era

- Part of Bleeding Kansas
Date	August 30, 1856
Location	Osawatomie, Kansas
Result	Pro-slavery victory

Belligerents
Free-Staters	Border ruffians

Commanders and leaders
John Brown	John William Reid; Samuel Jones; Rev. Martin White

Strength
40	250–400

Casualties and losses
5 killed, several wounded, ~12 prisoners	~5 wounded

The Battle of Osawatomie was an armed engagement that occurred on August 30, 1856, when 250–400 pro-slavery Border ruffians, led by John W. Reid, attacked the town of Osawatomie, Kansas, which had been settled largely by anti-slavery Free-Staters. Reid was intent on destroying the Free-State settlement and then moving on to Topeka and Lawrence to do more of the same. Abolitionist John Brown first learned of the raiders when they shot his son Frederick. With just 40 or so men, Brown tried to defend the town against the pro-slavery partisans, but ultimately was forced to withdraw; five Free-Staters were killed in the battle, and the town of Osawatomie was subsequently looted and burned by Reid's men. The battle was one of a series of violent clashes between abolitionists and pro-slavery partisans in Kansas and Missouri during the Bleeding Kansas era.

== Background ==
The passing of the Kansas–Nebraska Act in 1854 began the period called "Bleeding Kansas". Whether the new Kansas Territory would be slave or free was left up to popular sovereignty, counter to the prohibitions of the Missouri Compromise of 1820. Migrants on both sides of the issue immediately rushed in to settle and to determine the fate of the new territory. Almost immediately, tensions erupted into a full-blown border war waged mostly between civilians known as "Free-Staters", mostly from New England and other northeast states, and pro-slavery "Border ruffians" from Missouri.

The question of whether Kansas Territory would become a slave state or a free state was far more than a question about Kansas. The nation's impasse over slavery grew ever more acute. Rather than abolishing slavery in the United States, abolitionists turned to the politically and economically easier task of preventing its spread. If Kansas could choose slavery, other upcoming states could too. If Kansas were not allowed to choose slavery, then slavery would be limited to the states where it already existed, without the possibility of expansion. The Slave Power states found this unacceptable: American slavery, they claimed, was kind and healthy for both the individual and the country; Northern white workers, they suggested, might want to consider voluntary enslavement. To accept limits on slavery's expansion meant accepting that slavery should be limited. For the South to accept this meant making public its venality.

Following the 1855 arrival of the assertive abolitionist John Brown in Kansas, open conflict escalated with the Border ruffians' May 21, 1856, sacking of Lawrence, a stronghold of abolitionist sentiment. In retaliation, four days later, Brown and his followers committed what became known as the Pottawatomie massacre against five pro-slavery men. The Battle of Black Jack followed in early June, ending in the anti-slavery forces' favor and making Brown a threat in the eyes of the Border ruffians. Violence in Kansas steadily increased throughout the summer of 1856.

== Battle ==
The town of Osawatomie, an abolitionist settlement on the edge of the Marais des Cygnes River in present-day Miami County, Kansas, had been the victim of a pro-slavery raid early in the summer of 1856, and many of the original residents had fled east. The approximately two hundred people who still lived in the town in August were constantly afraid of another attack by Border ruffians, in large part because of the presence of John Brown and his use of the town as a headquarters.

On August 13, 1856, a "Free-State Band", probably consisting of John Brown's men but not Brown himself, raided Rev. Martin White's neighborhood, because he denounced the Pottawatomie Massacre as "a war of extermination having been begun by fanatics, against all who did not join them". Abolitionists attacked the houses of White's sons and stole seven head of horses and other property valued at $1,000. The same band of men then attacked White's house but was beaten off twice before returning to Osawatomie. Rev. Martin White then wrote to the Governor for Militia and led a movement on Osawatomie and met Fredrick Brown in the road.

On the morning of August 30, 1856, a force of several hundred Border ruffians led by pro-slavery leader John W. Reid entered Osawatomie, in which John Brown and his family were staying at the cabin of the Rev. Samuel Adair, the husband of Brown's half-sister, Florella. 26-year-old Frederick Brown, the only member of the Brown family present there at the time, approached the group. Rev. Martin White himself told the story to the Kansas House of Representatives on February 13 of the next year:

Whilst I was acting as one of the advance guard coming in contact with their picket guard, Frederick Brown, one of their guard advanced toward us. We halted and I recognized him and ordered him to 'halt,' but he replied 'I know you!' and continued to advanced towards me. I ordered him a second time to 'halt.' By this time, he was getting very close to me, and threw his hand to his revolver; to save my own life I shot him down.

White's bullet went straight through Brown's heart, killing him and making him the first casualty of the Battle of Osawatomie.

Having heard about his son's death, John Brown rushed from his camp toward Osawatomie, gathering several dozen men to meet the Missourian invaders. The fighting began when Reid advanced his forces in long rows toward the woods in which Brown and his men were located. Brown's men opened fire on Reid's mounted troops, wounding several horses and men and forcing them to dismount. Reid then opened fire with grapeshot, though it was aimed too high and only damaged trees. The long-distance firing resulted in little damage to either side for about fifteen minutes.

Finally, the Border Ruffians charged, and Brown's forces were forced into a retreat through the woods and back across a river. Five of the Free-Staters were killed, including Frederick Brown, with several others wounded.

The pro-slavery forces, instead of trying to catch Brown's men, then felt free to turn their attention to the town itself. In the end, the men under John W. Reid went through Osawatomie and burned almost all of its buildings; the three they spared were full of women and children. Before leaving, they thoroughly looted the town and took six prisoners, but were unable to find John Brown himself. Reid's forces continued north, attacking other towns on their way including Topeka.

== Aftermath and legacy ==
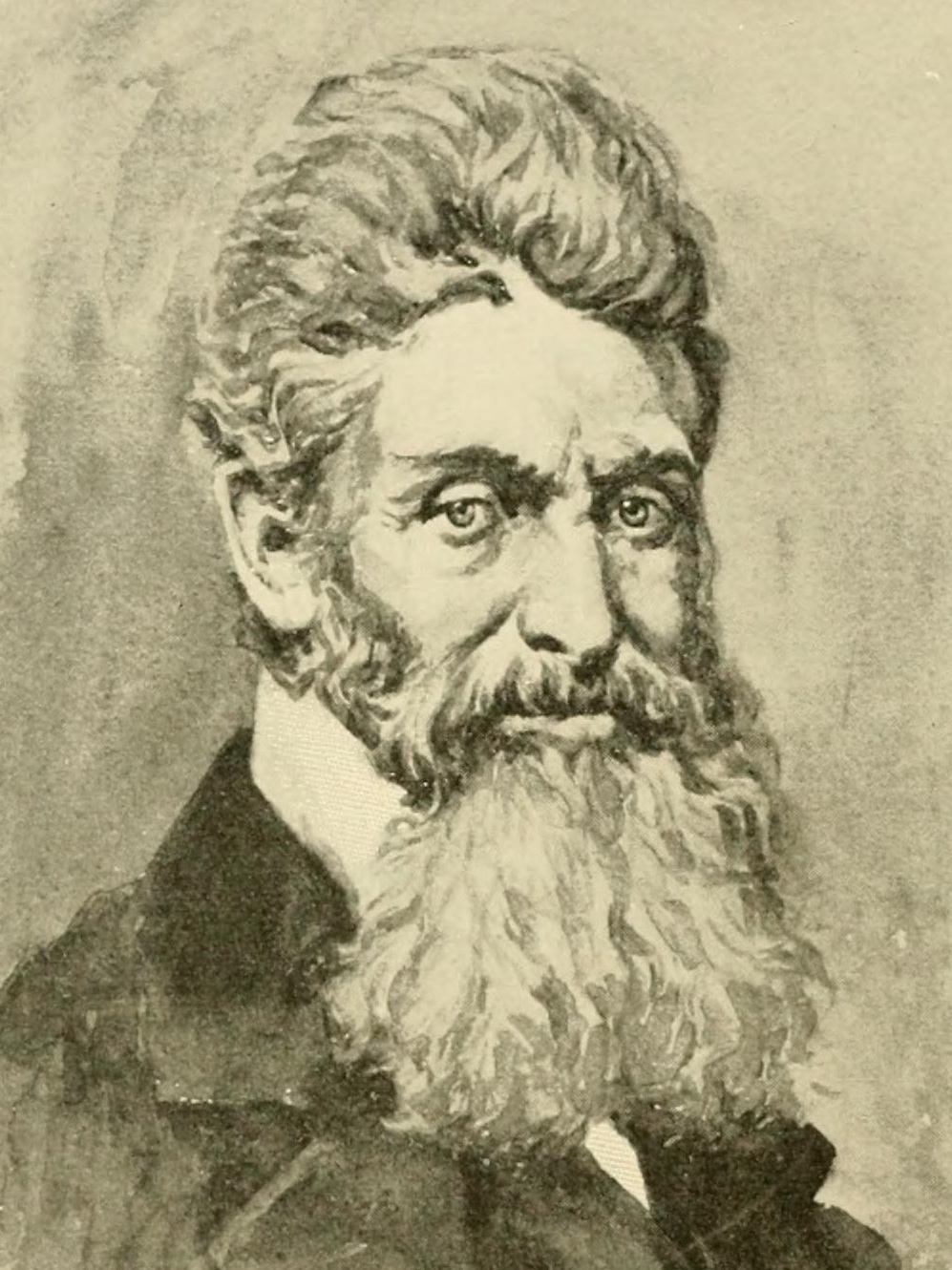
Osawatomie John Brown from the 1901 Baltimore & Ohio Railroad calendar

When he reemerged from the brush following the final departure of the Missourians that day, John Brown saw the charred settlement and reportedly said to his son Jason:

God sees it. I have only a short time to live – only one death to die, and I will die fighting for this cause. There will be no more peace in this land until slavery is done for. I will give them something else to do than extend slave territory. I will carry this war into Africa."

John Brown himself saw his reputation enlarged for his bravery and skill as a guerrilla warrior. Along with his other adventures over the following years, up to the raid on Harpers Ferry in 1859, Osawatomie made him into an increasingly notorious figure. He was now a wanted abolitionist firebrand, a madman in the eyes of some, and regarded as particularly dangerous to Southerners and the pro-slavery cause. It was recognized that he had faced a much more powerful foe in the battle, and he and almost all of his men had come out of it alive. One of the names by which Brown came to be known, in reference to his role in the Bleeding Kansas conflict, was "Osawatomie Brown".

In Kansas generally, there was a distinct escalation of violence between pro- and anti-slavery forces following the Battle of Osawatomie. The acting governor of the Kansas Territory at the time, Daniel Woodson, declared the region to be in rebellion and called on citizens to restore law and order, to which the Free-Staters took great offense. In response, the Border ruffians built up their own forces, and with the presence of the U.S. Army being largely ineffective, open violence continued. Partisan conflict instigated by both sides, including arson, looting, and crop destruction, would go on for at least another two months. Thereafter, there would be intermittent peace and violence in Kansas until the end of its antebellum conflicts in the Marais des Cygnes massacre in 1858. The breakout of the Civil War in 1861 eventually brought further violence to the territory.

Today, John Brown Memorial Park stands in Osawatomie, encompassing the site of the 1856 battle. U.S. Vice President Fairbanks gave a speech in 1906, accompanied by a "detail" of soldiers from Fort Leavenworth. The site of which it is a part, the John Brown Museum State Historic Site, was dedicated in 1911 and includes a life-size statue of John Brown and a monument dedicated to the five Free-Staters slain in the battle: Frederick Brown, George W. Partridge, David Garrison, Theron Parker Powers, and Charles Kaiser, all of whom with the exception of Kaiser are buried in the park. Rev. Samuel Adair's cabin survived, and Adair lived in it until his death in 1898. It was moved to the park in 1911 and later enclosed in a large stone building in 1928.

== See also ==
- List of battles fought in Kansas
