= Wakarusa War =

1855 armed conflict in Kansas, United States

- Part of Bleeding Kansas
Date	November–December 1855
Location	Douglas County, Kansas
Result	Formal truce

Belligerents
Free-State abolitionists	Pro-slavery settlers

Commanders and leaders
Charles L. Robinson; James Lane; John Brown	Samuel J. Jones; David Rice Atchison

Strength
800	700–1,500

Casualties and losses
2 killed	

The Wakarusa War was an armed standoff that took place in the Kansas Territory during November and December 1855. It is often cited by historians as the first instance of violence during the "Bleeding Kansas" conflict between anti-slavery and pro-slavery factions in the region.

The incident took place in Douglas County, centered on the Wakarusa River Valley and the town of Lawrence, where the opposing militias confronted each other for the first time. At the behest of Territorial Governor Wilson Shannon, the two sides eventually agreed to a truce, but it was short-lived, and widespread violence resumed the following spring.

== Background ==
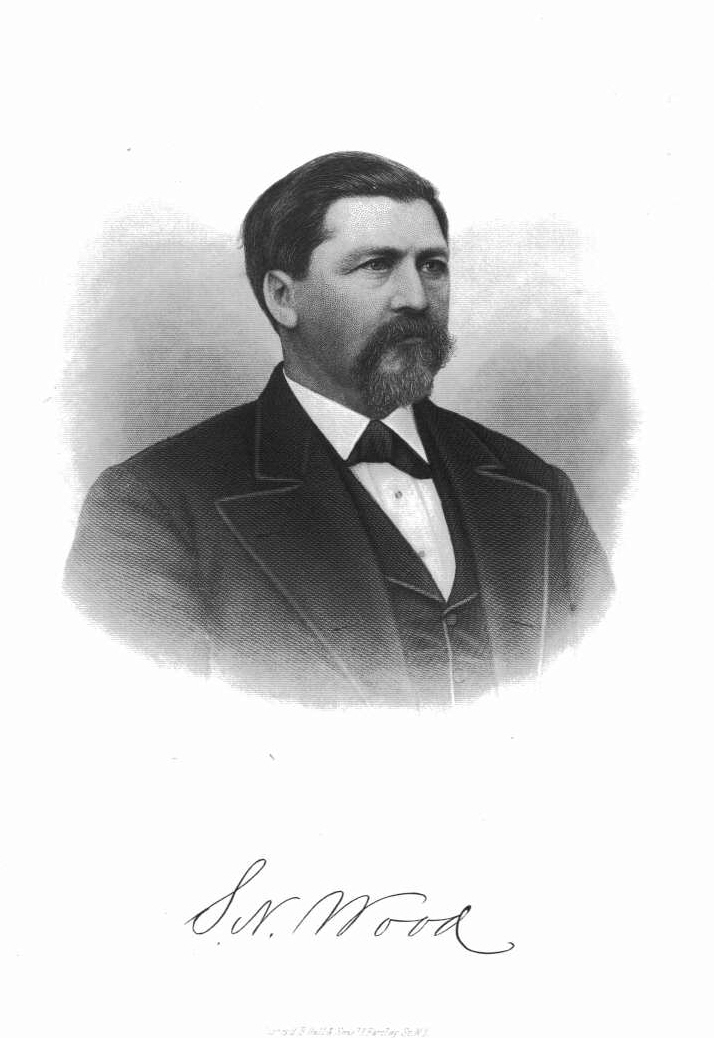
After being arrested by Sheriff Samuel J. Jones, Jacob Branson was rescued by Free-Staters, led by Samuel Newitt Wood (pictured).

While pro- and anti-slavery settlers had been antagonistic towards one another for some time, the genesis of the Wakarusa War in particular dates to November 21, 1855, when a pro-slavery settler named Franklin Coleman shot and killed a Free-Stater named Charles Dow. The murder was the culmination of a long-simmering feud between the two, as for some time they had argued about a land claim near Hickory Point, located about 14 miles (23 km) south of Lawrence. According to the Border War Encyclopedia, "Politics had not motivated Coleman to kill Dow, but the murder marked the genesis of the violent political divisions that characterized Kansas for the next 10 years."

According to one contemporary account, Coleman was a former abolitionist who had only turned pro-slavery after moving to Kansas. His dispute with Dow intensified when he trespassed on Dow's property and Dow reproved him. Shortly after, Coleman and his friends met Dow at a local blacksmith's shop, where Coleman ultimately shot him. Dow's Free-Stater friends rallied in anger.

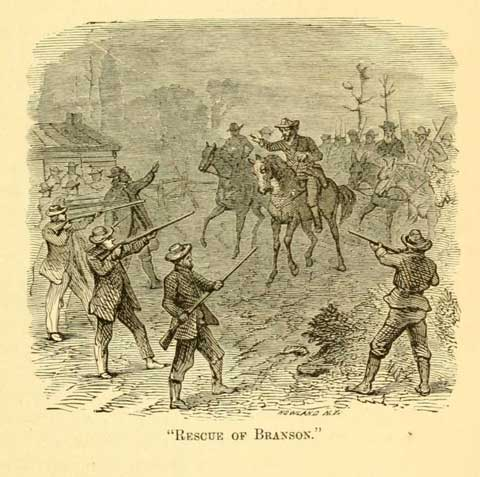
An 1868 illustration of the rescue of Jacob Branson

Coleman fled, but he soon gave himself up to Douglas County Sheriff Samuel J. Jones of Westport, Missouri. Jones had become sheriff under the auspices of a "bogus" pro-slavery government elected in opposition to a Free-State government simultaneously operating in Lawrence. Such dual governments had become widespread in Kansas in the preceding year as a result of political tensions surrounding the territory's anticipated statehood. Coleman argued that he had been acting in self-defense when he killed Dow, and simultaneously sought an arrest warrant for one of Dow's friends, a Free-Stater named Jacob Branson, who had witnessed the murder, apparently in an attempt to thwart Branson's threatened retaliation. When Jones investigated, he chose not to arrest Coleman for Dow's murder but instead arrested Branson on charges of disturbing the peace.

However, a posse of Free-Staters led by Samuel Newitt Wood, composed mostly of Branson's neighbors, intercepted Jones' party en route to Lecompton and forced them to release Branson, challenging Jones' authority and causing the pro-slavery faction to seethe with anger. Within a matter of days, the governor of the Kansas Territory, Wilson Shannon, called for the Kansas militia to settle the issue; Shannon had intended for the militia to be composed of Kansans, but Jones rallied a small army of between 700 and 1,500 men (sources vary), almost all of whom were from Missouri. This group, which included forces raised by David Rice Atchison and Benjamin Franklin Stringfellow, obtained arms from the state arsenal at Liberty, Missouri, crossed the Kansas border, and made its way to Lawrence, preparing to eradicate the Free-Staters.

== Siege ==
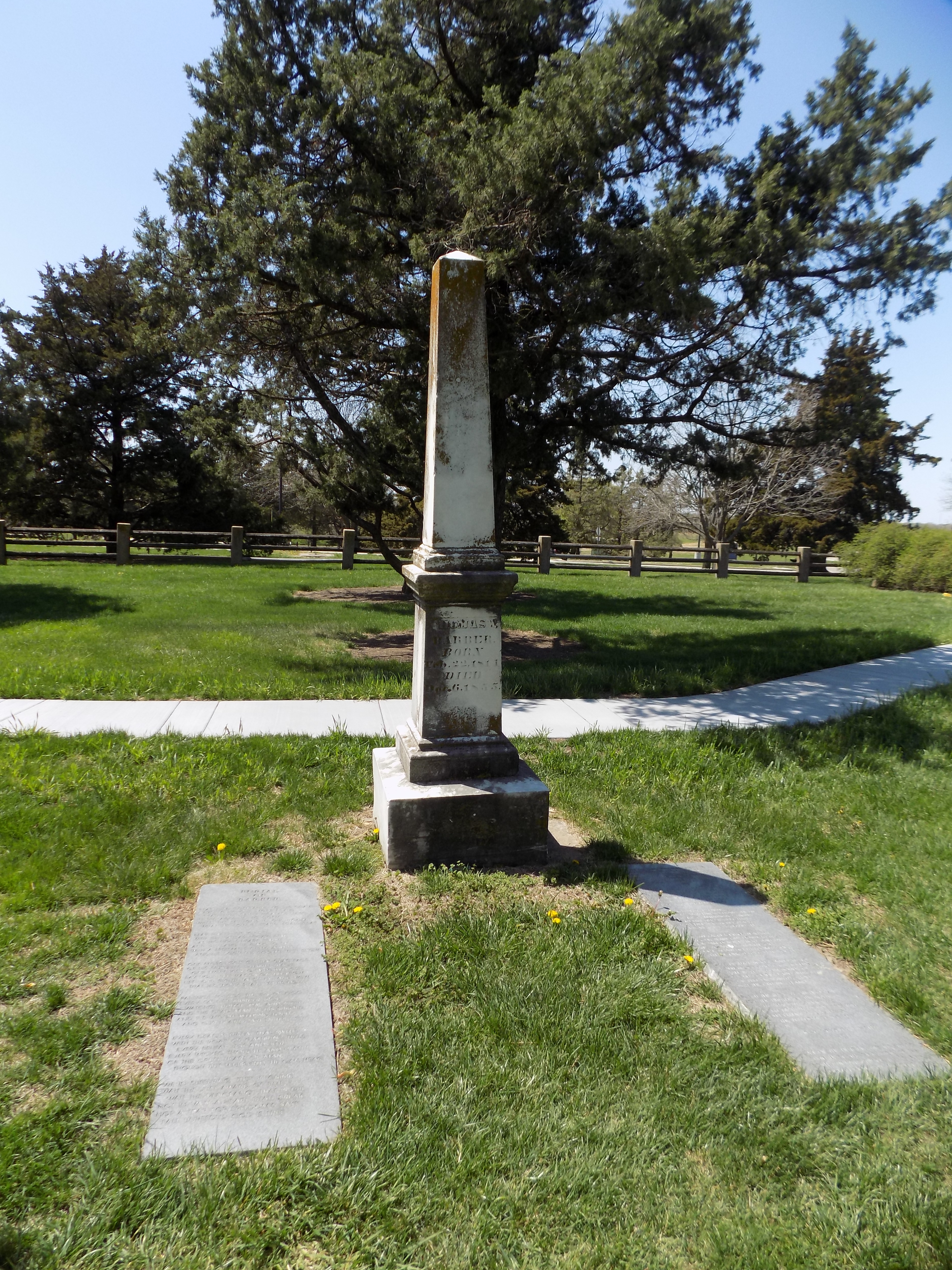
The grave marker of abolitionist Thomas Barber in Pioneer Cemetery, Lawrence, Kansas (2018). Barber's death inspired the poet John Greenleaf Whittier to write a poem titled Burial of Barber.

Digital reconstruction of the flag flown by Border Ruffians

During the siege, the main body of the invaders were encamped near the small pro-slavery settlement Franklin, located to the southeast of Lawrence, although others camped near the territorial capital of Lecompton. The invading army was indifferently armed as a whole, but some men had broken into the United States Arsenal at Liberty, Missouri and stolen guns, cutlasses, the "Old Sacramento Cannon" (which would later be used during the Sacking of Lawrence in 1856), and other munitions of war.

Hearing of the impending raid, the men of Lawrence raised up a militia of 800 men. Dr. Charles L. Robinson (an agent of the New England Emigrant Aid Company) was put in charge of the city's troops, and the future state senator James Lane was appointed as his second-in-command. Lawrence was also aided by the abolitionist John Brown and his sons. After about a week, the Free-Staters eventually sent an emissary to Shannon, who was briefed in regards to the situation. The news distressed him, so he journeyed to Lawrence to see the situation for himself and was quite startled by what he saw. He immediately called representatives from the Missouri army and Lawrence militia before him and urged them to sign a peace treaty. Such an agreement was finally made in December 1855 between Robinson and Lane (who represented the Free-Staters) and David Rice Atchison (who represented the pro-slavers). After much persuasion (which, according to Frank W. Blackmar, "was not easily accomplished"), the Missouri army reluctantly left the area.

Aside from Dow, the Wakarusa War claimed only one other life: that of Free State settler and abolitionist Thomas Barber, who, on his way to the defense of Lawrence, had been shot by the Pottawatomi Indian Agent George W. Clarke during an ambush. Barber's death was memorialized in a poem by John Greenleaf Whittier titled Burial of Barber.

== See also ==
- List of battles fought in Kansas
