= Pottawatomie massacre =

1856 massacre in the Kansas Territory

Pottawatomie Massacre
- Part of Bleeding Kansas
- Location: 38°26′14″N 95°6′32″W; Franklin County, Kansas
- Date: May 23–24, 1856
- Target: Pro-slavery settlers
- Attack type: slashing and shooting
- Deaths: 5
- Victims: Five killed, one child kidnapped
- Perpetrators: John Brown; Pottawatomie Rifles

The Pottawatomie massacre occurred on the night of May 24–25, 1856, in the Kansas Territory, United States. In reaction to the sacking of Lawrence by pro-slavery forces on May 21, and the telegraphed news of the severe attack on Massachusetts Senator Charles Sumner, John Brown and a band of abolitionist settlers—some of them members of the Pottawatomie Rifles—responded violently. Just north of Pottawatomie Creek, in Franklin County, they abducted and murdered five pro-slavery settlers. One teenage son of one of the settlers was also abducted by Brown and his fellow perpetrators, but was ultimately spared.

This soon became the most famous of the many violent episodes of the "Bleeding Kansas" period, during which a state-level civil war in the Kansas Territory was described as a "tragic prelude" to the American Civil War which soon followed. "Bleeding Kansas" involved conflicts between pro- and anti-slavery settlers over whether the Kansas Territory would enter the Union as a slave state or a free state. It has also been described as John Brown's most questionable and controversial act, both to his friends and his enemies. Abolitionist Frederick Douglass described the massacre by John Brown's band as "a terrible remedy for a terrible malady."

== Background ==
John Brown was particularly affected by the sacking of Lawrence, in which the Douglas County Sheriff Samuel Jones on May 21 led a posse that destroyed the presses and type of the Kansas Free State and the Herald of Freedom, Kansas's two abolitionist newspapers, the fortified Free State Hotel, and the house of Charles Robinson. He was the free-state militia commander-in-chief and leader of the "free state" government, established in opposition to the pro-slavery territorial government, based in Lecompton.

A Douglas County grand jury had ordered the attack because the hotel "had been used as a fortress" and an "arsenal" the previous winter, and the "seditious" newspapers were indicted because "they had urged the people to resist the enactments passed" by the territorial governor. The violence against abolitionists was accompanied by celebrations in the pro-slavery press, with writers such as Dr. John H Stringfellow of the Squatter Sovereign proclaiming that pro-slavery forces "are determined to repel this Northern invasion and make Kansas a Slave State; though our rivers should be covered with the blood of their victims and the carcasses of the Abolitionists should be so numerous in the territory as to breed disease and sickness, we will not be deterred from our purpose." Brown was outraged by both the violence of pro-slavery forces and by what he saw as a weak and cowardly response by the anti-slavery partisans and the Free State settlers, whom he described as "cowards, or worse". In addition, two days before the massacre, Brown learned about the caning of abolitionist Charles Sumner by the pro-slavery Preston Brooks on the floor of Congress. Salmon Brown recalled that upon hearing the news, he, his unmarried brothers, and his father went "crazy, crazy," and that "It seemed to be the finishing, decisive touch."

== Attack ==
A Free State company under the command of John Brown Jr. set out, and the Osawatomie company joined them. On the morning of May 22, 1856, they heard of the sack of Lawrence and the arrest of Dietzler, George W. Brown, and Jenkins. However, they continued their march toward Lawrence, not knowing whether their assistance might still be needed, and encamped that night near Ottawa Creek. They remained in the vicinity until the afternoon of May 23, at which time they decided to return home.

On May 23, John Sr. selected a party to accompany him on a private expedition. John Jr. objected to their leaving his company, but seeing that his father was unyielding, he consented, telling him, "Father, be careful and commit no rash act." The company consisted of John Brown, four of his sons—Frederick, Owen, Salmon, and Oliver—Thomas Wiener, and James Townsley, whom John Sr. had induced to carry the party in his wagon to their proposed field of operations. (Later, Townsley claimed that Brown had forced him to participate in the incident.)

"Altho vengence is not mine, I confess, that I do feel gratified to hear that you ware stopt in your fiendish career at Harper's Ferry, with the loss of your two sons, you can now appreciate my distress, in Kansas, when you then and there entered my house at midnight and arrested my husband and two boys and took them out of the yard and in cold blood shot them dead in my hearing, you cant say you done it to free our slaves, we had none and never expected to own one, but has only made me a poor disconsolate widow with helpless children while I feel for your folly. I do hope & trust that you will meet your just reward. O how it pained my Heart to hear the dying groans of my Husband and children if this scrawl give you any consolation you are welcome to it.
NB [postscript] my son John Doyle whose life I begged of (you) is now grown up and is very desirous to be at Charleston [Charles Town] on the day of your execution would certainly be there if his means would permit it, that he might adjust the rope around your neck if Gov. Wise would permit it."

—Mahala Doyle, in a letter to John Brown on the eve of his execution

They encamped that night between two deep ravines on the edge of the timber, some distance to the right of the main traveled road. There they remained unobserved until the following evening of May 24. The party left their hiding place sometime after dark and proceeded on their "secret expedition". Late in the evening, they called at the house of James P. Doyle and ordered him and his two adult sons, William and Drury, to go with them as prisoners. Doyle's 16-year-old son, John, who was not a member of the pro-slavery Law and Order Party, was spared after his mother pleaded for his life. The three men were escorted by their captors into the darkness, where Owen Brown and his brother Frederick killed them with broadswords. John Brown Sr. did not participate in the stabbing, instead firing the coup de grâce into the head of the fallen James Doyle.

Brown and his band then went to the house of Allen Wilkinson and ordered him out. He was slashed and stabbed to death by Henry Thompson and Theodore Wiener, possibly with help from Brown's sons. From there, they crossed the Pottawatomie and, sometime after midnight, forced their way into the cabin of James Harris at swordpoint. Harris had three house guests: John S. Wightman, Jerome Glanville, and William Sherman, the brother of Henry Sherman ("Dutch Henry"), a militant pro-slavery activist. Glanville and Harris were taken outside for interrogation and asked whether they had threatened Free State settlers, aided Border Ruffians from Missouri, or participated in the sack of Lawrence. Satisfied with their answers, Brown's men let Glanville and Harris return to the cabin. William Sherman, however, was led to the edge of the creek and hacked to death with swords by Wiener, Thompson, and Brown's sons.

Having learned at Harris's cabin that "Dutch Henry", their main target in the expedition, was away from home on the prairie, they ended the expedition. They returned to the ravine where they had previously encamped. They rejoined the Osawatomie company on the night of May 25.

In the two years before the massacre, there had been eight killings in Kansas Territory attributable to slavery politics, and none in the vicinity of the massacre. Brown killed five in a single night, and the massacre was the match to the powder keg that precipitated the bloodiest period in "Bleeding Kansas" history, three months of retaliatory raids and battles in which 29 people died.

== Impact ==
The Pottawatomie massacre was called by William G. Cutler, author of the History of the State of Kansas (1883), the "crowning horror" of the whole Bleeding Kansas period:

The news of the horrid affair spread rapidly over the Territory, carrying with it a thrill of horror, such as the people, used as they had become to deeds of murder, had not felt before. ... The news of the event had a deeper significance than appeared in the abstract atrocity of the act itself. ... It meant that the policy of extermination or abject submission, so blatantly promulgated by the pro-slavery press, and proclaimed by pro-slavery speakers, had been adopted by their enemies, and was about to be enforced with appalling earnestness. It meant that there was a power opposed to the pro-slavery aggressors, as cruel and unrelenting as themselves. It meant henceforth, swift retaliation—robbery for robbery—murder for murder— that "he who taketh the sword shall perish by the sword."

Kansas Senator John James Ingalls in 1884 stated with approval the judgment of a Free State settler: "He was the only man who comprehended the situation, and saw the absolute necessity for some such blow, and had the nerve to strike it." This resulted from the men killed being leaders in a conspiracy to "drive out, burn and kill; and that Potawatomie Creek was to be cleared of every man, woman and child who was for Kansas being a free state."

According to Brown's son Salmon, who participated, it was "the grandest thing that was ever done in Kansas."

== Debate over Brown's role and motivation ==
John Brown was evasive about his role in the massacre, but in Kansas Territory, his role was no secret. A United States congressional committee investigating the troubles in Kansas Territory identified Brown as the chief perpetrator. Nonetheless, following John Brown's raid on Harpers Ferry, there was a widespread denial of Brown's involvement in the Eastern abolitionist press. Brown's first biographer, James Redpath, denied Brown's presence at the murders.

Defenders of Brown argue that the raid was a preemptive strike against border ruffians who were plotting to bring a proslavery army into Kansas and murder the Browns, and that Brown made sure to narrowly target the attack rather than rampaging senselessly through town.

In response to those that argued the attack was motivated by the threats of violence by the pro-slavery targets of the attack, the governor of Kansas, Charles Robinson, stated:

When it is known that such threats were as plenty as blue-berries in June, on both sides, all over the Territory, and were regarded as of no more importance than the idle wind, this indictment will hardly justify midnight assassination of all pro-slavery men, whether making threats or not... Had all men been killed in Kansas who indulged in such threats, there would have been none left to bury the dead.

However, Robinson also said:

They [the killings at Pottawatomie] had the effect of a clap of thunder from a clear sky. The slave men stood aghast. The officials were frightened at this new move on the part of the supposed subdued free men. This was a warfare they were not prepared to wage, as of the bona fide settlers there were four free men to one slave man.

According to Senator Ingalls:

I did not know of a settler of '56 but what regarded it as amongst the most fortunate events in the history of Kansas. It saved the lives of the Free-State men on the Creek, and those who did the act were looked upon as deliverers.

== See also ==
- List of battles fought in Kansas
- List of incidents of civil unrest in the United States

== Bibliography ==
- Reynolds, David S. (2006). John Brown, Abolitionist: The Man Who Killed Slavery, Sparked the Civil War, and Seeded Civil Rights. New York: Vintage Books.
- Oates, Stephen B. (1970). To Purge This Land with Blood : A Biography of John Brown. New York: Harper & Row.
