= Benjamin Franklin Stringfellow (1816–1891) =

American politician

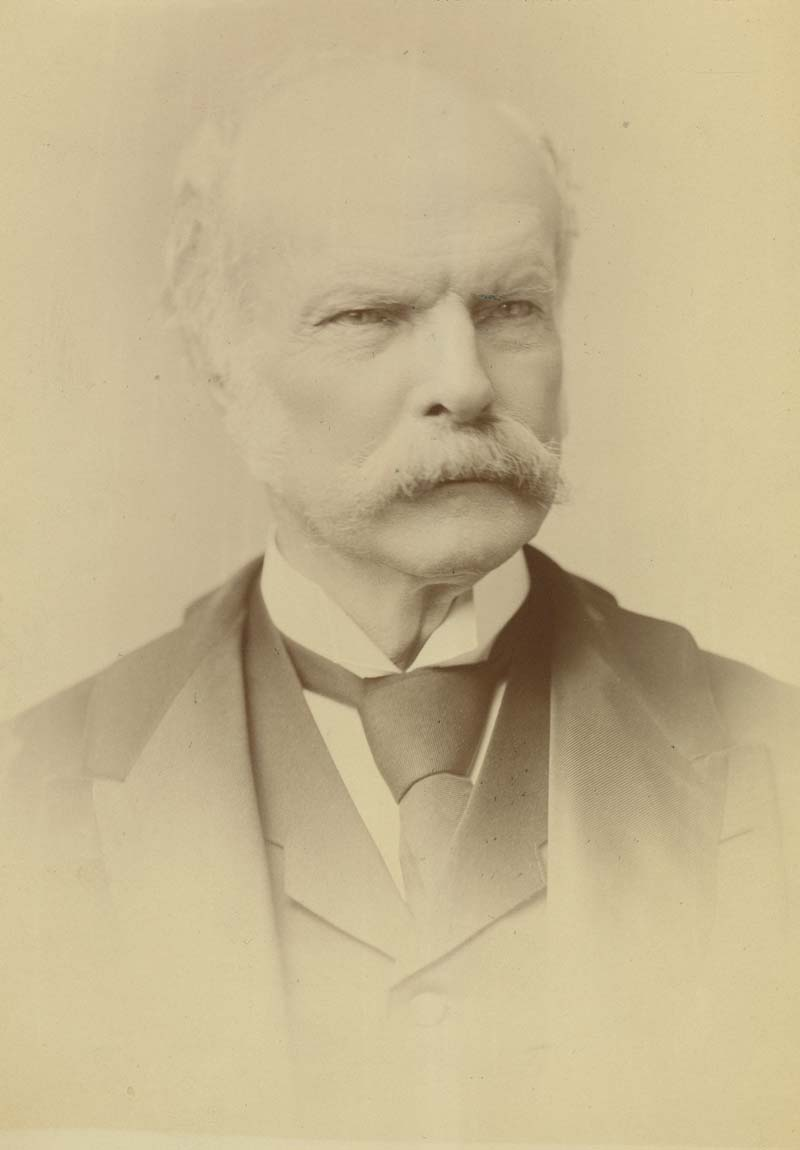
- Benjamin Stringfellow in an undated photograph

Missouri Attorney General
- In office 1845–1849
- Governor: John C. Edwards; Austin A. King
- Preceded by: Samuel Mansfield Bay
- Succeeded by: William A. Robards

Benjamin Franklin Stringfellow (September 3, 1816 – April 26, 1891) was a pro-slavery border ruffian in Kansas, when the slavery issue was put to a local vote in 1855 under the Popular Sovereignty provision.

As a general in the Missouri Militia, and former Missouri Attorney General, Stringfellow openly defied the law by declaring that Missourians were free to vote in Kansas territory and attacked abolitionist patrols in what became known as Bleeding Kansas. When the vote went against him, he turned his attention to developing the Atchison, Topeka and Santa Fe Railroad.

== Early life ==
Stringfellow was the youngest of the ten children born to Robert Stringfellow, a veteran of the War of 1812 and merchant at Raccoon Ford on the Rapidan River and farmer in Culpeper County, Virginia, and Mary Plunkett, daughter of an early industrialist in Orange County, Virginia. John H. Stringfellow was his brother. Educated in Fredericksburg, Virginia, he then attended the University of Virginia and was admitted to practice law in Louisville, Kentucky, in 1837.

In 1839 Stringfellow moved to Boone's Lick, Missouri and practiced law in Keytesville, Missouri. He was elected to the Missouri House of Representatives as an anti-Benton Democrat serving from Chariton County, Missouri.

Stringfellow served as Missouri's Attorney General from 1845 to 1849.

== Border ruffian ==
In 1853 he and his doctor brother John moved to Weston, Missouri, in Platte County, just across the Missouri River from Fort Leavenworth, Kansas. B. F. Stringfellow practiced law with Peter T. Abell and published the pro-slavery Squatter Sovereign with his brother. In 1854, after four slaves from Platte County ran away to Leavenworth, they organized the Platte County Self-Defensive Association to attempt to prevent Free-Stater settlement of Kansas. The Stringfellow brothers also stumped western Missouri, organizing "blue lodges" along the entire Kansas border. The brothers, working with David Rice Atchison, attempted to get residents of Southern states to move to Kansas with their slaves to counter settlements by the anti-slavery Massachusetts Emigrant Aid Company. Stringfellow also issued "Stringfellow's Exposition," which claimed Missourians could vote in Kansas as it decided whether to enter the Union as a free state or a slave state. Stringfellow's position as general in the Missouri Militia increased his opinion's clout.

The New York Tribune quoted him in an 1855 speech in St. Joseph, Missouri:

I tell you to mark every scoundrel that is in the least tainted with free-soilism or abolitionism and exterminate him. Neither give nor take quarter from the damned rascals. I propose to mark them in this house, and on the present occasion, so you may crush them out. To those who have qualms of conscience as to violating laws, state or national, the crisis has arrived when such impositions must be disregarded, as your rights and property are in danger, and I advise one and all to enter every election district in Kansas, in defiance of Reeder and his vile myrmidons, and vote at the point of the bowie-knife and the revolver. Neither give or take quarter, as our cause demands it. It is enough that the slaveholding interest wills it, from which there is no appeal. What right has Governor Reeder to rule Missourians in Kansas? His proclamation and prescribed oath must be prohibited. It is to your interest to do so. Mind that slavery is established where it is not prohibited.

== Fight with Kansas Governor Andrew Reeder ==
On July 2, 1855, he was accused of attacking Kansas Territory Governor Andrew Horatio Reeder at Reeder's office in the Shawnee Methodist Mission in Fairway, Kansas. The free state version of the encounter says:

Stringfellow sprang to his feet, seized his chair, and felled the Governor to the floor, kicking him when down. He also attempted to draw a revolver, but was prevented from using it by District Attorney Isaaks, and Mr. Halderman, the Governor's private secretary. And this the origin of the term, so common on the Kansas border for so many years, of "Border Ruffian"

The slave state version said that Stringfellow told the governor:

, sir, that you have publicly spoken and written of me in the East as a frontier ruffian, and I have called to ascertain whether you have done so...Then, sir, you uttered a falsehood, and I demand of you the satisfaction of a gentleman. I very much question your right to that privilege, for I do not believe you to be a gentleman; but nevertheless give you the opportunity to vindicate your title to that character, by allowing you to select such friends as you may please, and I will do the same, and we will step out here and settle the matter as gentlemen do...Then I will have to treat you as I would any other offensive animal.

Bloodshed would occur on both sides of the Missouri-Kansas border in the Bleeding Kansas skirmishes as attempts were to influence how the state entered the union, with 5,000 Missourians voting in one Kansas election alone.

== Atchison, Topeka and Santa Fe Railroad ==
In 1859 after Kansas entered as a free state, Stringfellow moved to Atchison (named for his ally, political boss and future U.S. Senator David Rice Atchison), where he continued to practice law, although his brother John temporary returned to Virginia to settle their father's estate. The Stringfellow brothers organized the Atchison and St. Joseph Railroad Company and B. F. Stringfellow became company attorney. He also did legal work for the Kansas City, St. Joseph & Council Bluffs Railroad and the Kansas and Western Missouri Railway Company. During the Civil War, age prevented him from enlisting, and the Platte Bridge Railroad Tragedy (which destroyed a crucial bridge on the Hannibal and St. Joseph Railroad on September 3, 1861) and defeats of the Missouri State Guard may have changed his pro-slavery sympathies. Stringfellow continued his law practice through the war and concentrated on promoting the area's economic development. He worked with former antislavery adversary Cyrus K. Holliday, who had organized the Atchison and Topeka Railway Company in 1859, which reorganized in 1863 as the Atchison, Topeka and Santa Fe Railway. Using their political connections and funds (government railroad bonds and land grants) allotted by the Pacific Railroad Acts, they connected their lines to the First transcontinental railroad at Council Bluffs in 1869. Three years later Topeka became the eastern terminus for the second transcontinental route, which ended in Los Angeles.

Stringfellow died at the home of his daughter in Chicago, Illinois on April 26, 1891.

Legal offices
Preceded by Samuel Mansfield Bay	Missouri State Attorney General; 1845-1849	Succeeded by William A. Robards
