= Border ruffian =

Proslavery Missourian raiders within Kansas Territory

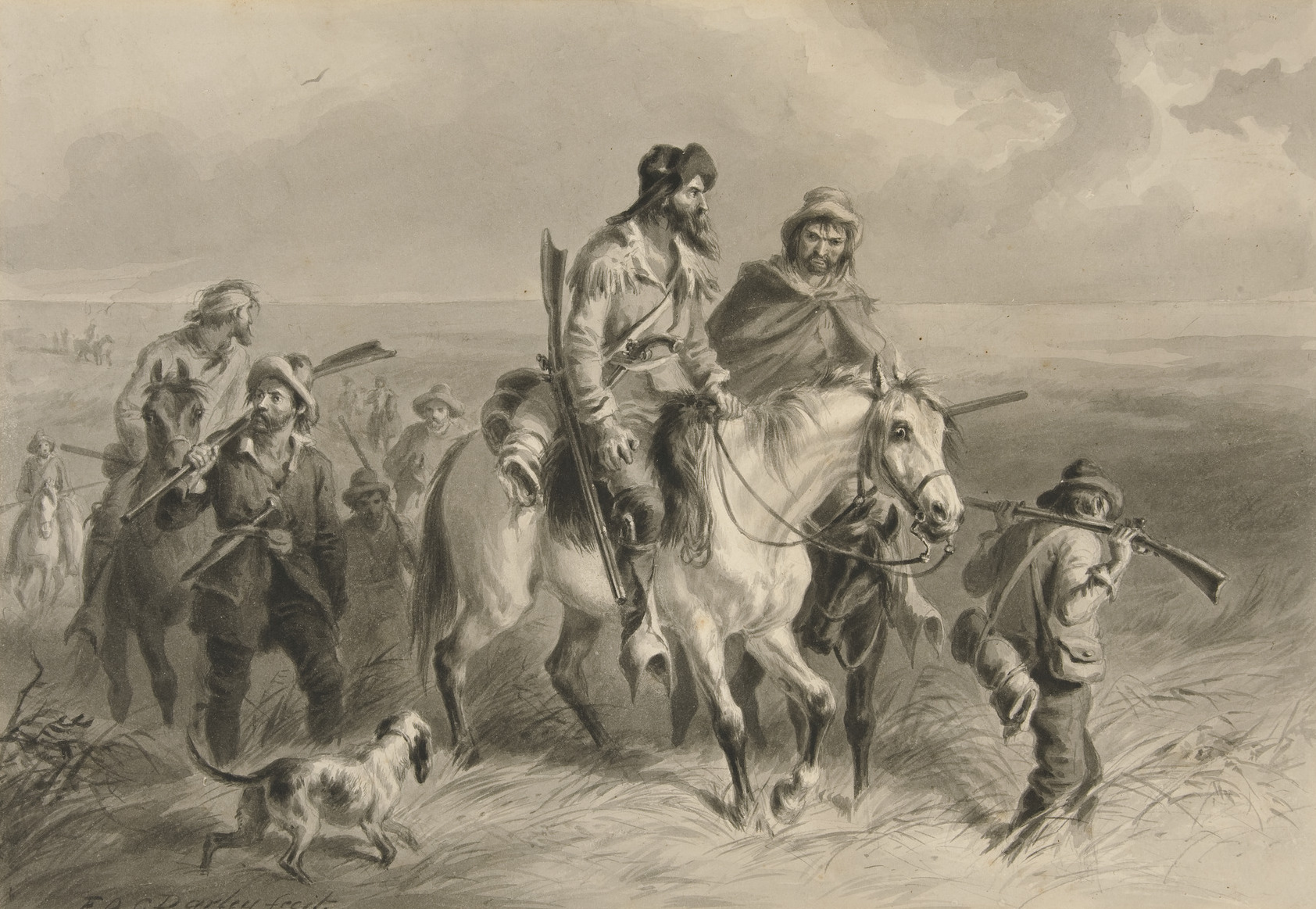
1888 engraving of border ruffians entering the Kansas Territory

Border ruffians were proslavery raiders who crossed into the Kansas Territory from Missouri during the mid-19th century to help ensure the territory entered the United States as a slave state. Their activities formed a major part of a series of violent civil confrontations known as "Bleeding Kansas", which peaked from 1854 to 1858. Crimes committed by border ruffians included electoral fraud, intimidation, assault, property damage and murder; many border ruffians took pride in their reputation as criminals. After the outbreak of the American Civil War in 1861, many border ruffians fought on the side of the Confederate States of America as irregular bushwhackers.

== Origin ==
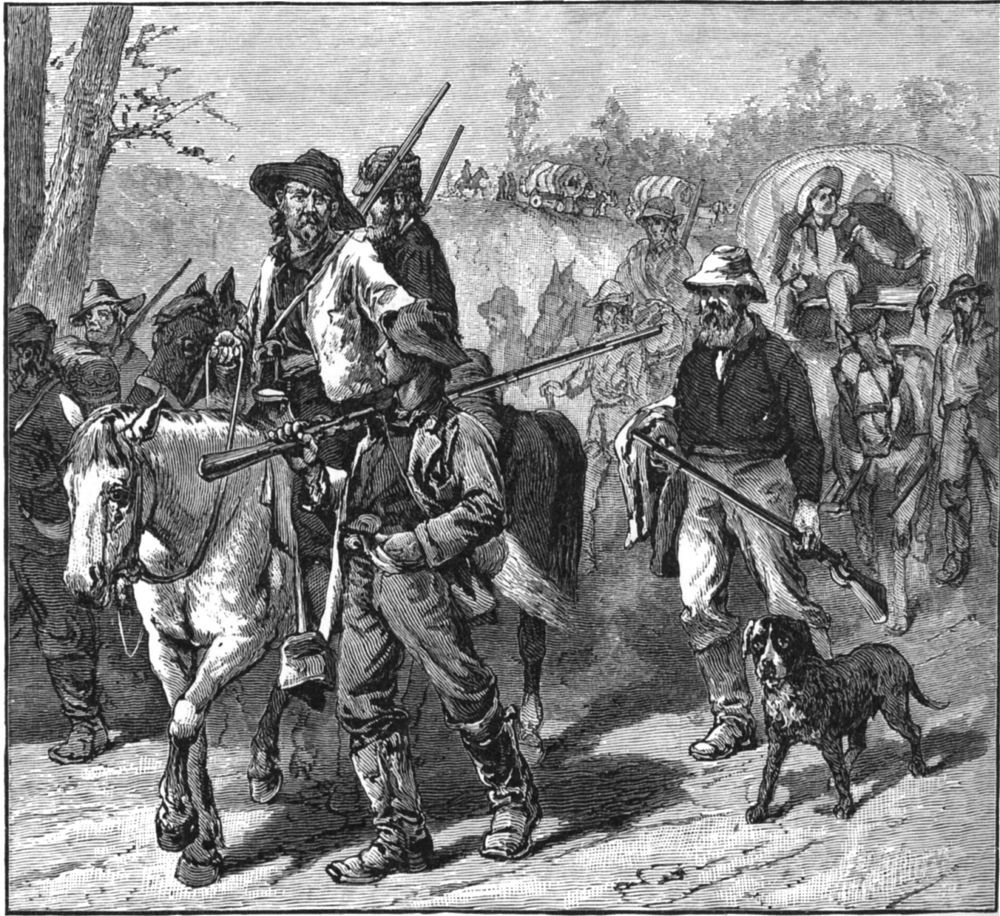
Armed border ruffians going into Kansas

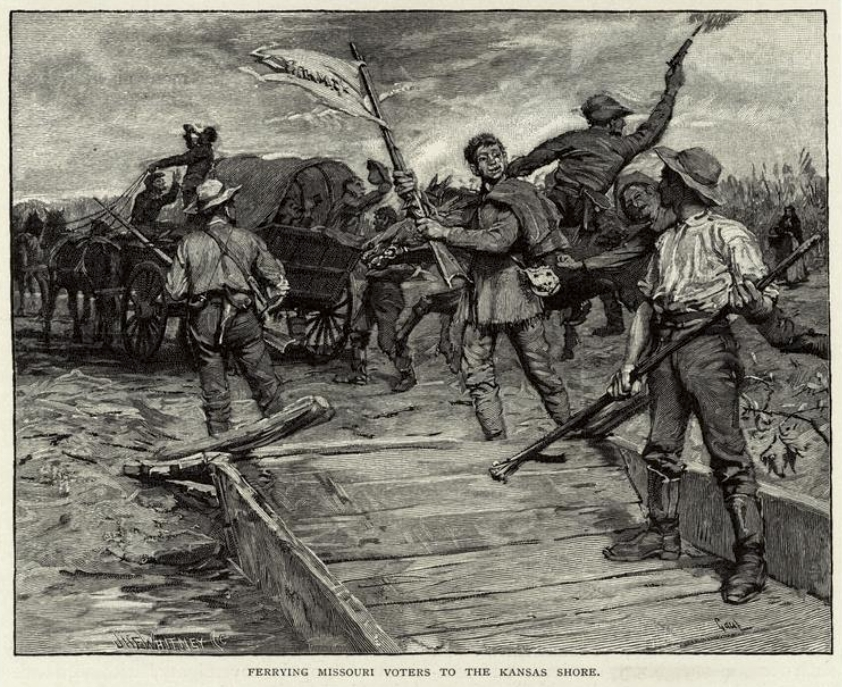
Ferrying Missouri voters [across the Missouri River] to the Kansas shore, by Gilbert Gaul

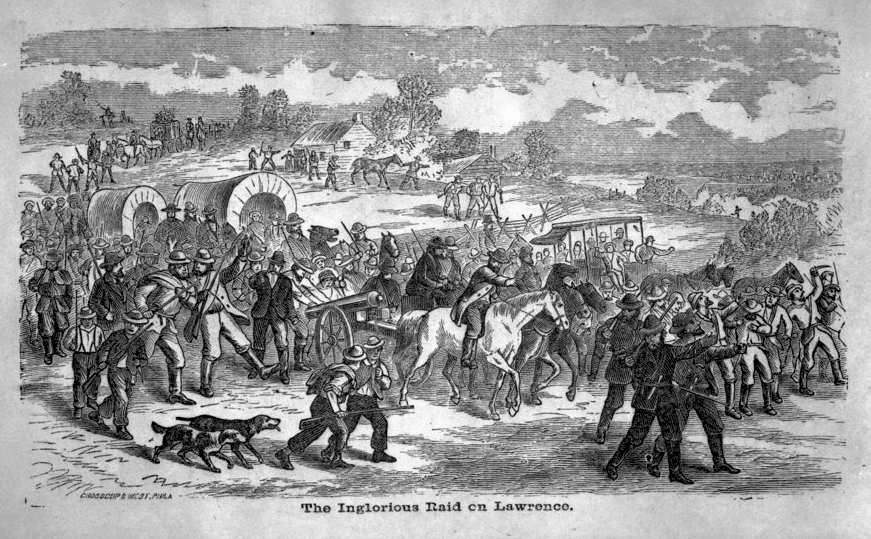
Border ruffians, with a cannon, marching on Lawrence, Kansas

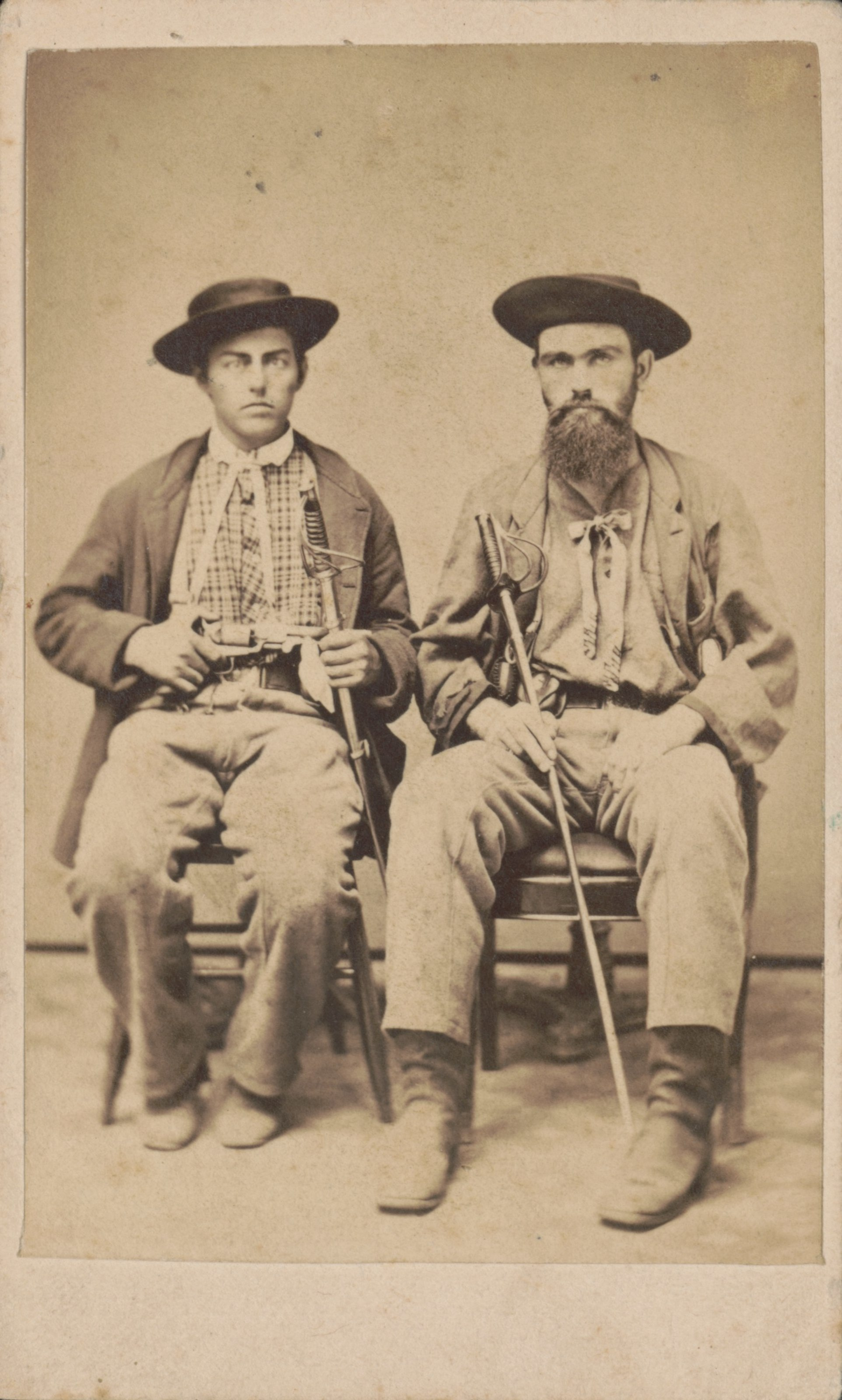
Two unidentified border ruffians with swords

The 1913 edition of Webster's Dictionary reflects the 19th century understanding of the word ruffian as a "scoundrel, rascal, or unprincipled, deceitful, brutal and unreliable person".

Among the first to use the term border ruffian in connection with the slavery issue in Kansas was the Herald of Freedom, a newspaper published in Lawrence, Kansas. On October 8, 1857, it reported the following:

Gov. Reeder soon after March 30 visited Washington, hoping to induce Pres. Pierce to disregard the election. On his way there he stopped at his old home, Easton, Pa., and told the story of Kansas' wrongs, in a speech to his old neighbors. In this he designated the invaders as "Border Ruffians", and said they were led by their chiefs, David R. Atchison and B. F. Stringfellow.

Armed with revolvers and Bowie knives, border ruffians forcefully interfered in the Kansas row over slavery. A correspondent for the London Times while visiting Kansas in 1856 reported many occurrences of the so-called bowie-knife voting in Kansas when voters were heckled and harassed by border ruffians. In response, the New England Emigrant Aid Company shipped Sharps rifles to the Kansas Territory, in crates said to have been labeled "Bibles".

At that time, many Kansas settlers opposed slavery. However, slavery advocates were determined to have their way regardless. When elections were held, bands of armed border ruffians seized polling places, prevented Free-State men from voting, and cast votes illegally, falsely stating they were Kansas residents.

Border ruffians operated from Missouri. It was said that they voted and shot in Kansas, but slept in Missouri. They not only interfered in territorial elections, but also committed outrages on Free-State settlers and destroyed their property. This violence gave the origin of the phrase "Bleeding Kansas". However, political killings and violence were exercised by both warring sides.

The federal government did not interfere to stop the violence. Hence, episodes as the sacking of Lawrence, Kansas, in May 1856 became possible. U.S. Senator David Rice Atchison (D-Missouri) personally incited the assembling mob:

Gentlemen, Officers & Soldiers! This is the most glorious day of my life! This is the day I am a border ruffian! ... Spring like your bloodhounds at home upon that d--d accursed abolition hole; break through every thing that may oppose your never flinching courage! Yess, ruffians, draw your revolvers & bowie knives, & cool them in the heart's blood of all those d--d dogs, that dare defend that d--d breathing hole of hell.

Border ruffians contributed to the increasingly violent sectional tensions, culminating in the American Civil War.

== Leaders and followers ==
Border ruffians did not constitute an organized group. They never had meetings, had no designated leaders, and no one ever directed any message to them as a body.

Border ruffians were driven by the rhetoric of politicians such as David Rice Atchison, Benjamin Franklin Stringfellow, John H. Stringfellow, editor of the pro-slavery newspaper Squatter Sovereign (Atchison, Kansas), and Speaker of the House in the First Kansas Territorial Legislature, the so-called Bogus Legislature. and Rev. Thomas Johnson, a Methodist preacher. Samuel J. Jones, and Daniel Woodson, a proslavery newspaper editor. In particular, Atchison called Northerners "negro thieves" and "abolitionist tyrants". He encouraged Missourians to defend their institution "with the bayonet and with blood" and, if necessary, "to kill every God-damned abolitionist in the district".

Few of the ordinary border ruffians actually owned slaves because most were too poor. Their motivation was hatred of Yankees and abolitionists, and fear of free Blacks living nearby. Kansas slavery was small-scale and operated mainly at the household level. Most of the Kansans, according to historian David M. Potter, were concerned primarily about land titles. He pointed out that, "the great anomaly of 'Bleeding Kansas' is that the slavery issue reached a condition of intolerable tension and violence ... in an area where a majority of the inhabitants apparently did not care very much one way or the other about slavery."

Frank W. Blackmar's encyclopedia of Kansas history summarizes how the rank-and-file among border ruffians took pride in both how they were called and what they were doing:

While the main objects of the Border Ruffian chiefs were the overthrow and destruction of free-state men and the establishment of slavery in Kansas, the ruffian border bands delighted in raiding towns, ransacking houses, stealing horses, and doing whatever they could that was annoying, exciting, and rough. The towns and country along the eastern tier of counties were raided with uncomfortable frequency. Free-state men holding claims were driven from them, elections were molested and crimes of violence committed. When the crash came between north and south many of these men became bushwhackers or guerrillas.

The presence of violent bands of both Kansan and Missourian combatants made it difficult for settlers on the Kansas–Missouri border to remain neutral.

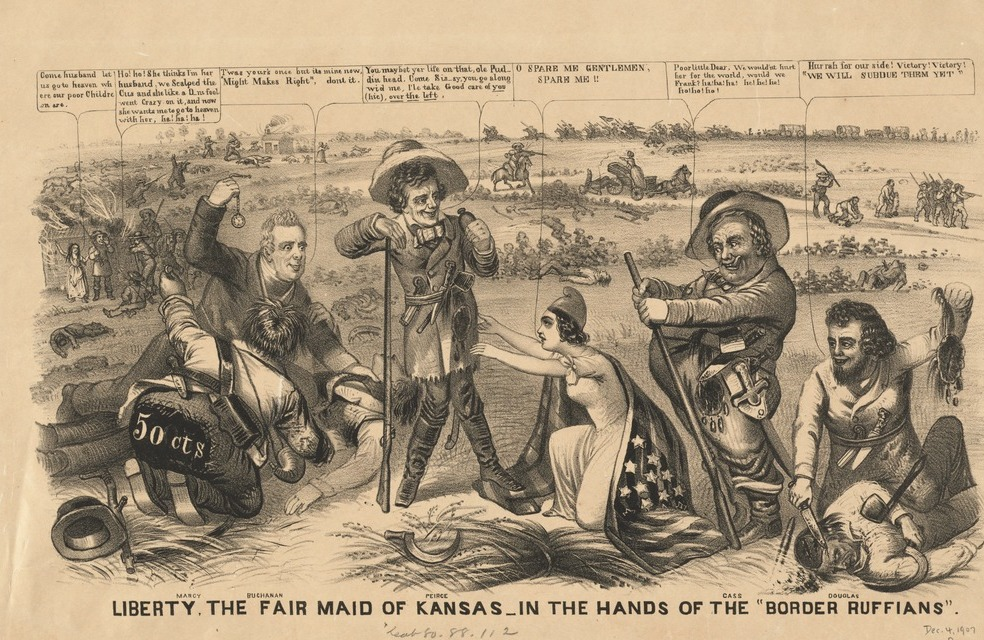
Liberty, the fair maid of Kansas, in the hands of the border ruffians, c. 1856

== History ==
The history of border ruffians is woven into the historical context of Bleeding Kansas, or the border war, a series of violent civil confrontations in Kansas in 1854–1859. Kansas Territory was created by the Kansas–Nebraska Act of 1854. The Act repealed the previous Federal prohibition on slavery in that area. Instead, the locally elected territorial legislature was to decide on the slavery issue.

The first territorial census, taken in January–February 1855, counted 8601 people; 2905 were deemed eligible to vote; there were 192 enslaved in the Territory.

After the Kansas–Nebraska Act repealed the Missouri Compromise of 1820 and allowed Kansans to vote on slavery, the opponents from both sides of the slavery debate started to recruit settlers to increase support of their causes.

=== Immigration to Kansas ===
Proslavery immigrants aided by the Lafayette Emigration Society, and anti-slavery settlers, established their own territorial enclave (such as Atchison and Leavenworth), and Free-State immigrants aided by the New England Emigrant Aid Company established theirs (such as Lawrence, Topeka). This circumstance resulted in a deep partisan divide in regard to the slavery question among settlers and their civic and business leaders. Then extremists on both side resorted to arms. On the pro-slavery side violence was committed by the border ruffians and on the free-state side by the jayhawkers.

On November 29, 1854, border ruffians elected a pro-slavery territorial representative to Congress, John W. Whitfield. It was determined after a Congressional investigation that 60% of the votes were illegal.

On March 30, 1855, border ruffians elected a pro-slavery Territorial Legislature, which introduced harsh penalties for speaking against slavery. It was called the Bogus Legislature by Free-Staters due to the fact that border ruffians arrived en masse and there were twice as many votes cast than there were eligible voters in the Territory. Failure to ensure fair elections led to establishment of two territorial governments in Kansas, one pro-slavery and another Free State, each claiming to be the only legitimate government of the entire Territory.

Despite all border ruffians' attempts to push anti-slavery settlers out of the Territory, far more Free-State immigrants moved to Kansas than pro-slavery. In 1857, the pro-slavery faction in Kansas proposed the Lecompton Constitution for the future state of Kansas. It tried to get the Lecompton Constitution adopted with additional fraud and violence, but by then there were too many Free-Staters there and the U.S. Congress refused to confirm it.

Border ruffians also engaged in general violence against Free-State settlements. They burned farms and sometimes murdered Free-State men. Most notoriously, border ruffians twice attacked Lawrence, the Free-State capital of the Kansas Territory. On December 1, 1855, a small army of border ruffians laid siege to Lawrence, but were driven off. This became the nearly bloodless climax to the "Wakarusa War".

On May 21, 1856, an even larger force of border ruffians and pro-slavery Kansans captured Lawrence, which they sacked.

Free-State settlers struck back. Anti-slavery Kansan irregulars, led by Charles R. Jennison, James Montgomery, and James H. Lane, among others, and known as jayhawkers, attacked proslavery settlers and suspected border ruffian sympathizers. Most notoriously, abolitionist John Brown killed five proslavery men at Pottawatomie. In revenge, a band of border ruffians, led by John W. Reid, sacked the village of Osawatomie, Kansas after the Battle of Osawatomie.

=== Aid to the Free-State cause ===
T. W. Higginson, a minister, was instrumental in turning the Massachusetts State Kansas Committee, a former subsidiary of the New England Emigrant Aid Company, into a nationally known organization. It worked to recruit abolitionist settlers, raised funds for them to migrate to Kansas, and equipped them with rifles to use against border ruffians. In 1856 it acquired 200 Sharps rifles for $4,947.88 that were shipped to Kansas via Iowa and ended in John Brown's hands. In September 1858, it invested $3,800 in 190 Sharps rifles for Kansas. Abolitionist Henry W. Beecher pronounced that,

Sharps rifle was a truly moral agency, and that there was more moral power in one of those instruments, so far as the slaveholders of Kansas were concerned, than in a hundred Bibles. You might just as well ... read the Bible to Buffaloes as those fellows who follow Atchison and Stringfellow; but they have a supreme respect for the logic that is embodied in Sharps rifles.

It was documented that in 1855–1856 various aid organizations from free states spent at least $43,074.26 on rifles, muskets, revolvers, and ammunition, including one cannon, destined for Kansas.

On July 9, 1856, the Massachusetts State Kansas Committee and the New England Emigrant Aid Company initiated the establishment of the Kansas National Aid Committee headquartered in Chicago. Thaddeus Hyatt, head of the national committee, began collecting money, arms, provisions, clothing, and agricultural supplies to aid the Free-State cause in Kansas. The goal was to transport five thousand settlers to Kansas Territory giving them a year's worth of supplies.

A distribution depot was set up at Mt. Pleasant, Iowa, where immigrants were furnished not only with horses and wagons and other supplies, but also with arms; they were organized into companies and drilled. The National Kansas Committee spent in 1856–1857 around US$100,000 (equivalent to $3,580,000 in 2025) on the Free State cause.

=== Outcomes ===
On August 2, 1858, the pro-slavery Lecompton Constitution of 1857 was rejected at the polls, signifying the defeat of border ruffians' cause. On January 29, 1861, President James Buchanan signed the bill that approved the Wyandotte Constitution and Kansas came to the Union as a Free State.

=== During the Civil War ===
During the American Civil War, the violence on the Kansas-Missouri border not only continued, but escalated tremendously. Many of the former border ruffians became pro-Confederate guerrillas, or bushwhackers. They operated in western Missouri, sometimes raiding into Kansas, and Union forces campaigned to suppress them. Farms on the Missouri-Kansas state line were looted and burned. Suspected guerrillas were killed; in retaliation, bushwhackers murdered Union sympathizers and suspected informers. Confederate guerrilla leaders, such as "Bloody Bill" Anderson and William Quantrill, were feared in Kansas during the war.

Many of the Union troops fighting bushwackers were former jayhawkers who held deep grudges against border ruffians. Charles R. Jennison recruited the 7th Kansas Cavalry Regiment, which became known as the Jennison's Jayhawkers. In the fall and winter of 1861 and 1862, Jennison's Jayhawkers became infamous for looting and destroying the property of Missourians.

Some of the jayhawkers joined a paramilitary group called the Red Legs. Wearing red gaiters and numbered around 100, Red Legs served as scouts during the punitive expedition of the Union troops in Missouri. Jayhawkers and Red Legs pillaged and burned multiple towns in 1861–1863 in Missouri. The destruction of Osceola, Missouri, is depicted in the movie The Outlaw Josey Wales.

== See also ==
- Sacking of Lawrence
- Sacking of Osceola
- Wakarusa War
- Pottawatomie massacre
- Battle of Osawatomie
- Marais des Cygnes massacre
