= Charles W. Dow =

Charles W. Dow (died November 21, 1855) (Note: Some sources say November 21, 1855 while others say December 20, 1855. Dow's tombstone in Oakwood Cemetery reads December 20, 1855. According to the Lawrence Herald of Freedom newspaper, Dow's obituary says November 21st, and according to a letter by John Brown dated December 16, 1855, the killing happened "about three or four weeks" ago.) was an early settler of the Kansas Territory who became the first American settler killed in Kansas after being shot by Franklin Coleman in 1855, an event which historians often consider the beginning of the violence of Bleeding Kansas.

== Settling in Kansas ==
Charles Dow along with his father Ladd, came to Kansas in 1855 from Ohio and settled in the Hickory Point (now Stony Point) area of Douglas County. Dow, a free stater, was shot by Franklin Coleman over a land dispute and was killed immediately. Coleman initially blamed Jacob Branson, a friend of Dow's, for the killing. Dow was murdered by Coleman, who claimed self defense, not political motivation. Dow was initially buried on his land but was later moved to Baldwin City's Oakwood Cemetery along with his father who was originally buried in Stony Point Cemetery.

== Aftermath ==
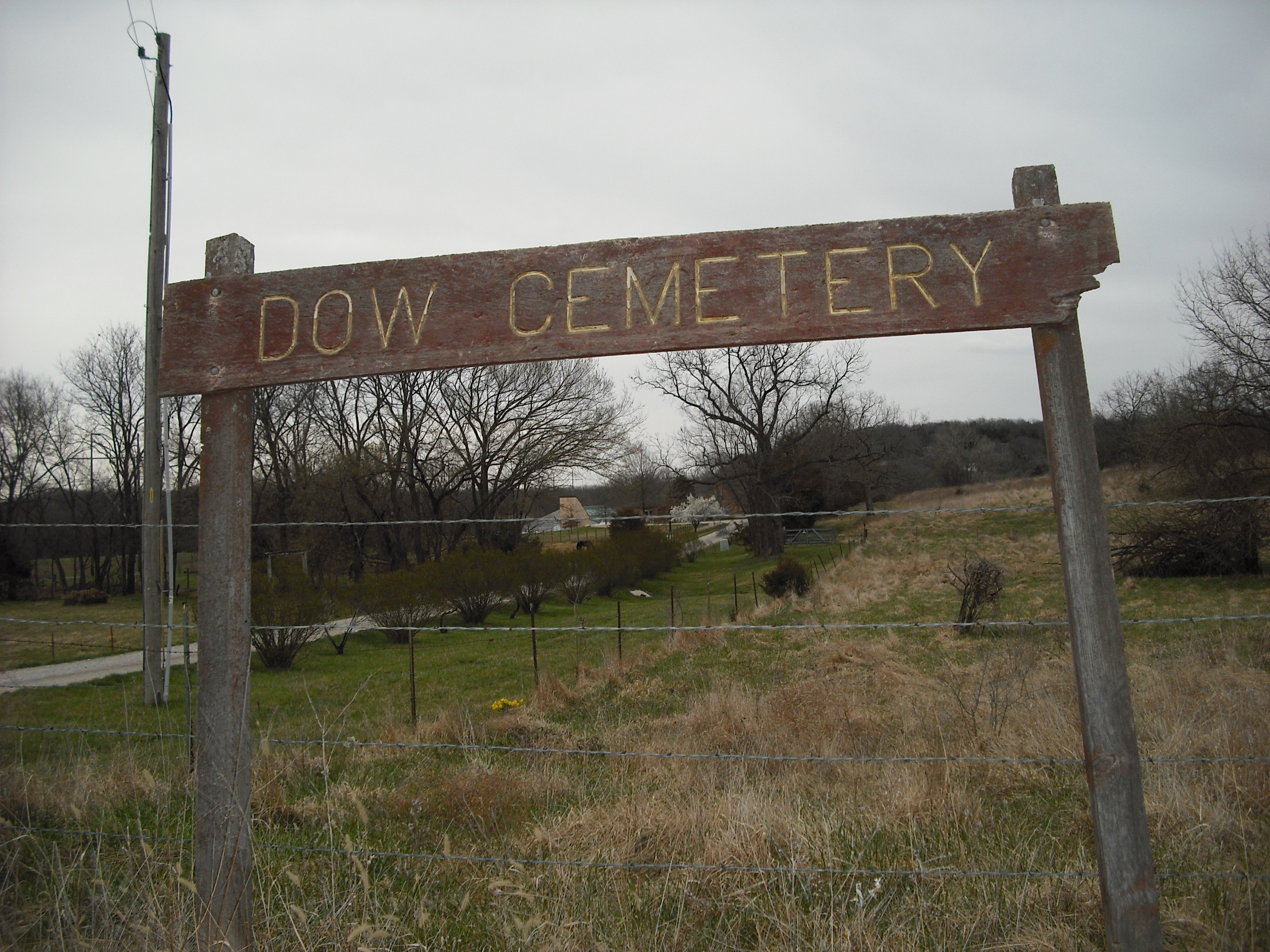
The old redwood sign marking the location of Dow Cemetery. The sign has been replaced with a newer one.

The shooting of Dow triggered a series of confrontations that later led to the Sacking of Lawrence, the Wakarusa War, the Pottawatomie massacre, and the Battle of Black Jack. Coleman was one of the men taken captive during the Battle of Black Jack in 1856 and was linked to another killing of a Free-Stater that year. The Dow Cemetery was used until 1873, when Stony Point Cemetery was founded, and is estimated to contain 75 burials. The cemetery is nearly lost now but a sign erected by the local Santa Fe Trail Historical Society marks the location.

== Local legends ==
There are two local legends about Franklin Coleman. In one, Coleman was chased by other Free-Staters after the killing and holed himself up in a cave that collapsed due to his gunfire. The other involves Coleman returning from the gold fields of Pikes Peak, being attacked by robbers, and hiding in a cave which collapsed as he defended himself. The cave is located near Eisenhower Street in Baldwin.
