= Massachusetts Street =

- Lawrence's Downtown Historic District
- U.S. National Register of Historic Places
- U.S. Historic district
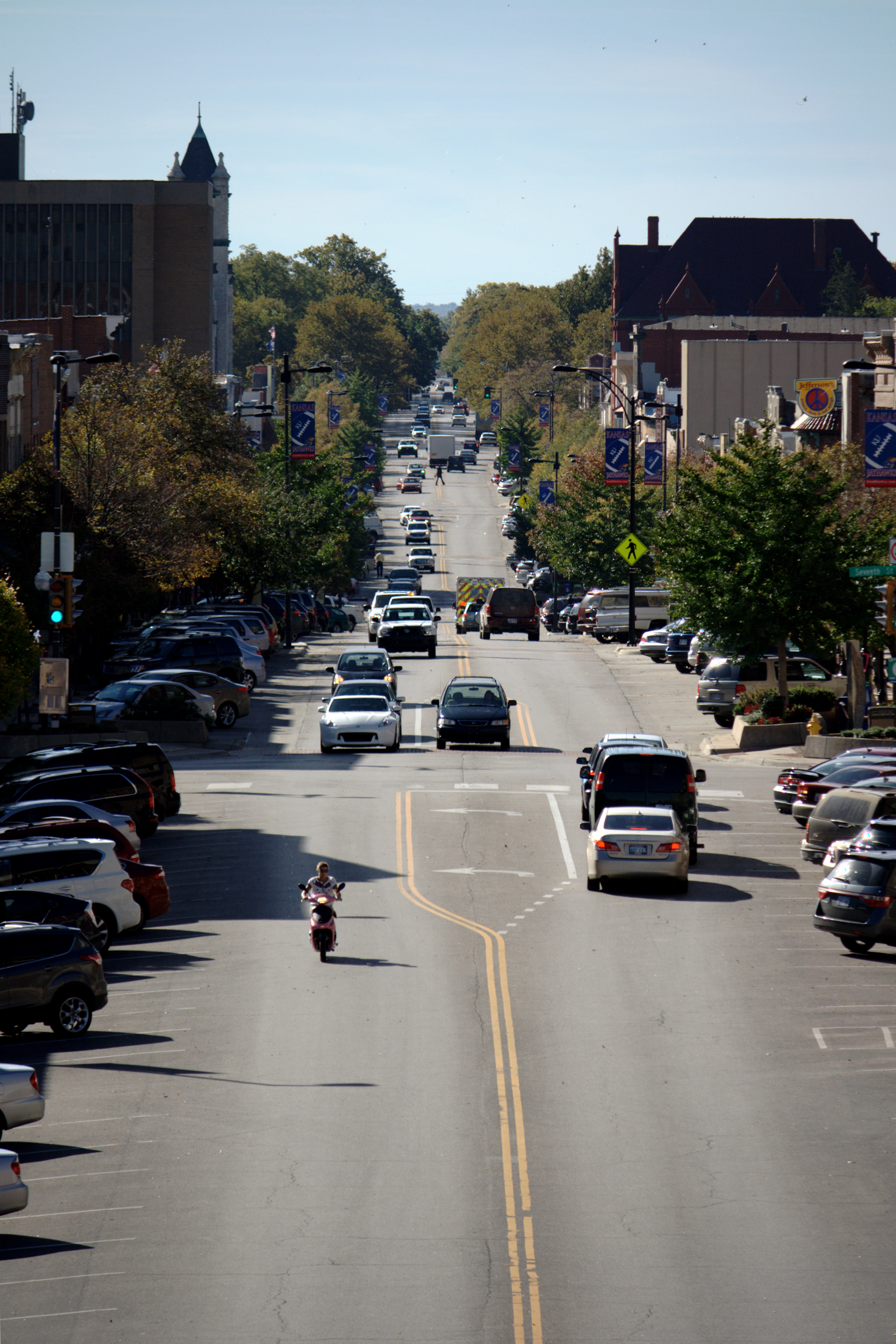
- Massachusetts Street looking south, 2014

- Location within Kansas Location within the United States
- Location: Along Massachusetts between Sixth and South Park Streets, Lawrence, Kansas
- Coordinates: 38°57′59″N 95°14′10″W
- Area: 48.1 acres (19.5 ha)
- Architect: Multiple
- Architectural style: Late Victorian, Neoclassical architecture
- MPS: Lawrence, Kansas MPS
- NRHP reference No.: 04000685
- Added to NRHP: July 15, 2004

Massachusetts Street (often referred to colloquially as either Mass Street or Mass) is the main street that runs through the central business district of downtown Lawrence, Kansas. It begins just south of the Kansas River at Sixth Street and continues south until reaching Haskell Indian Nations University. The street was given its name by members of the New England Emigrant Aid Company, most of whom were from the state of Massachusetts. In 2014, Mass Street was named the most popular tourist attraction in Kansas by TripAdvisor.

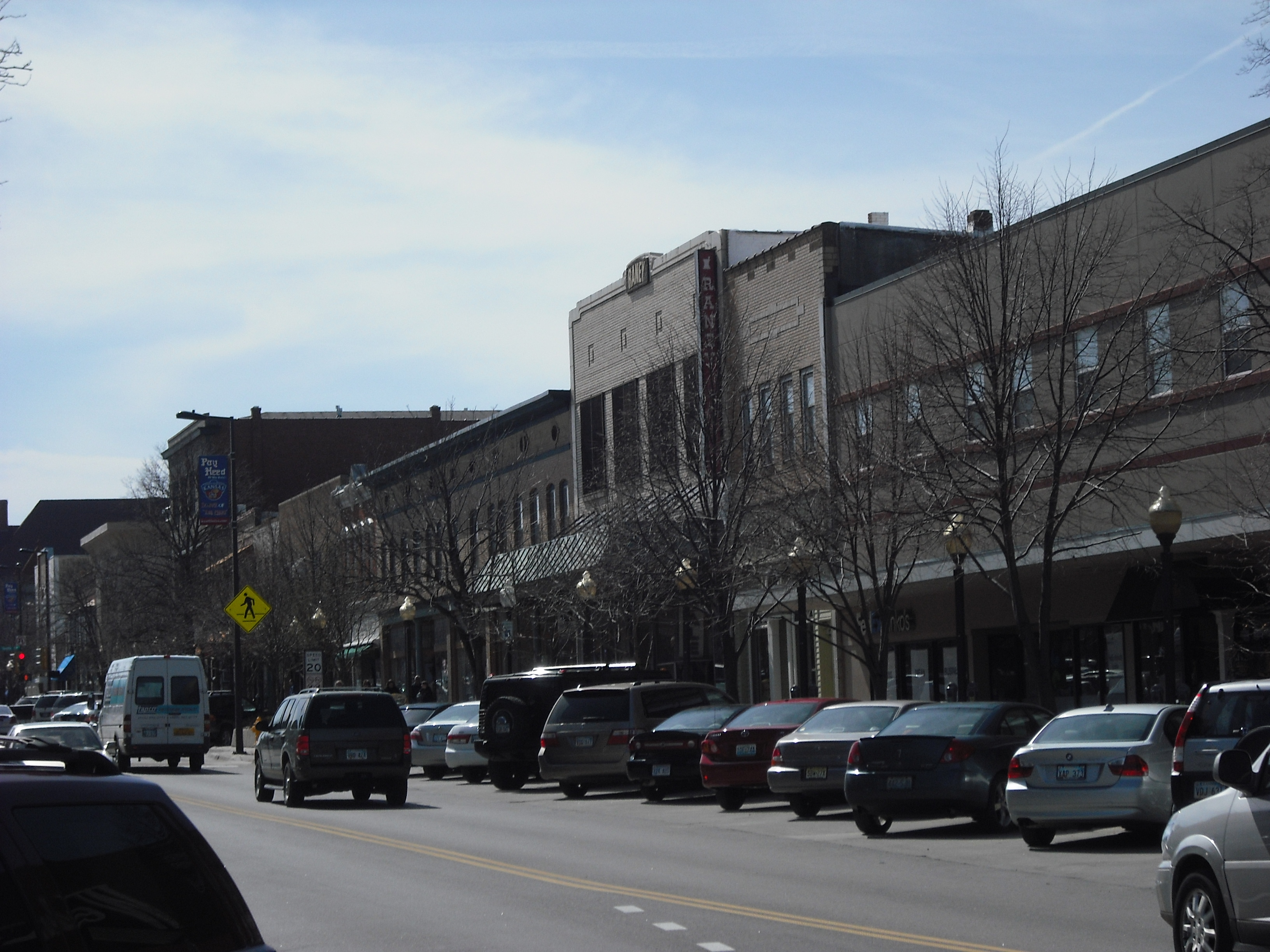
The 900 block of Massachusetts Street, 2009

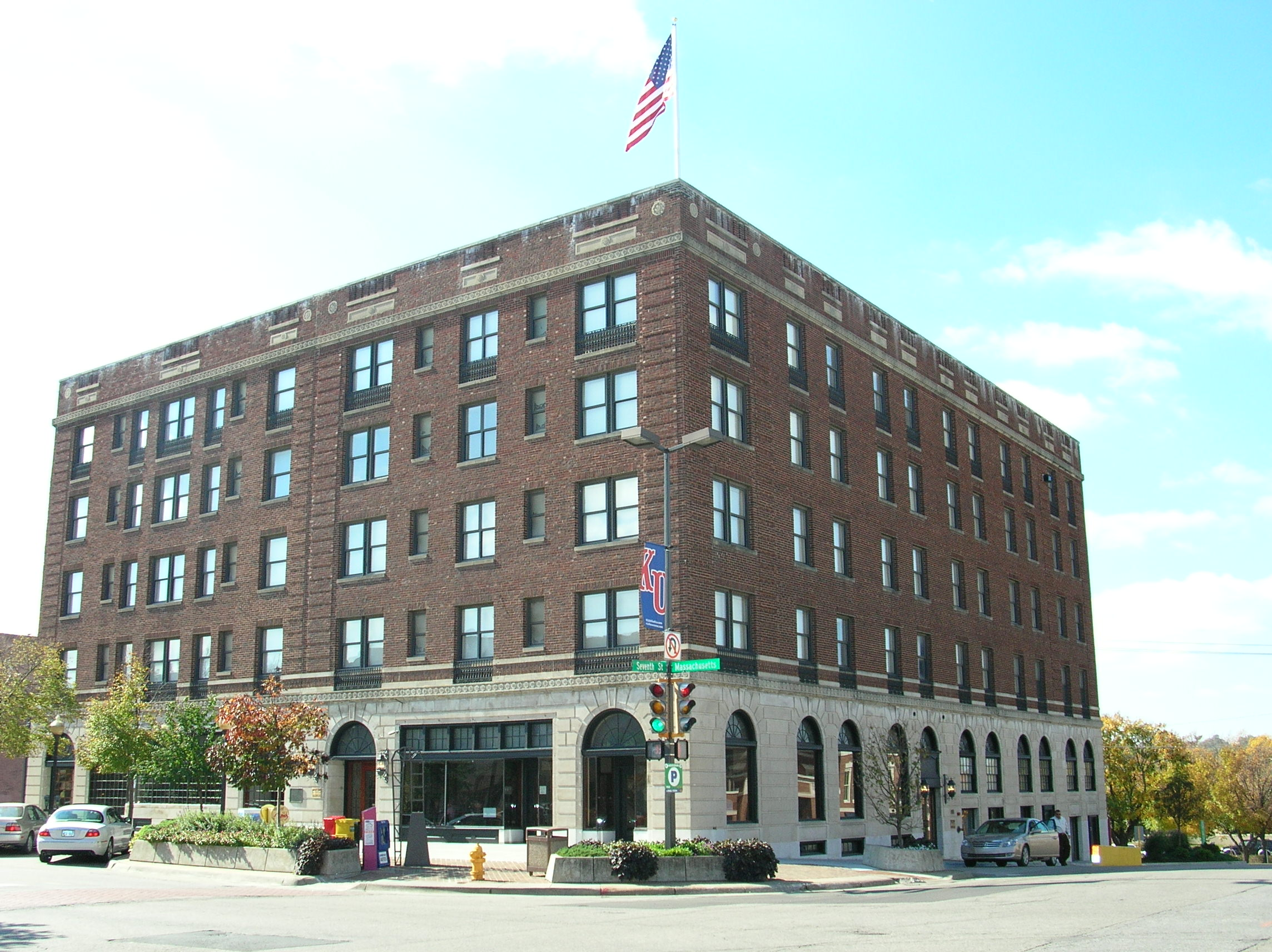
The Eldridge Hotel, 2004

The 600 through 1200 block of Massachusetts is also listed on the National Register of Historic Places under Lawrence's Historical District. Most of the buildings were built between 1856 and 1953. Listed separately under the National Register are the Eldridge Hotel, the Douglas County Courthouse and Watkins National Bank (now Watkins Community Museum). Other listings along Mass Street but not located downtown are the Breezedale Historic District, the Goodrich House, the Edward House House, the Mackie House and the Roberts House (now the Castle Tea Room that was designed by Kansas State Capitol architect John G. Haskell).

Other historic businesses and sites of interest along Massachusetts Street are Liberty Hall, the Free State Brewing Company (Kansas' first legal brewery in over 100 years), the Round Corner Pharmacy (which was the longest-running pharmacy in the state until closing in 2009), the House Building (the only downtown building to survive Quantrill's Raid), the Replay Lounge, the Granada (a former theater and popular music venue), South Park (a city park established when Lawrence was founded in 1854), and Liberty Memorial Central Middle School (located in a former high school built in 1923).
