= The Eldridge Hotel =

- The Eldridge House Hotel
- U.S. National Register of Historic Places
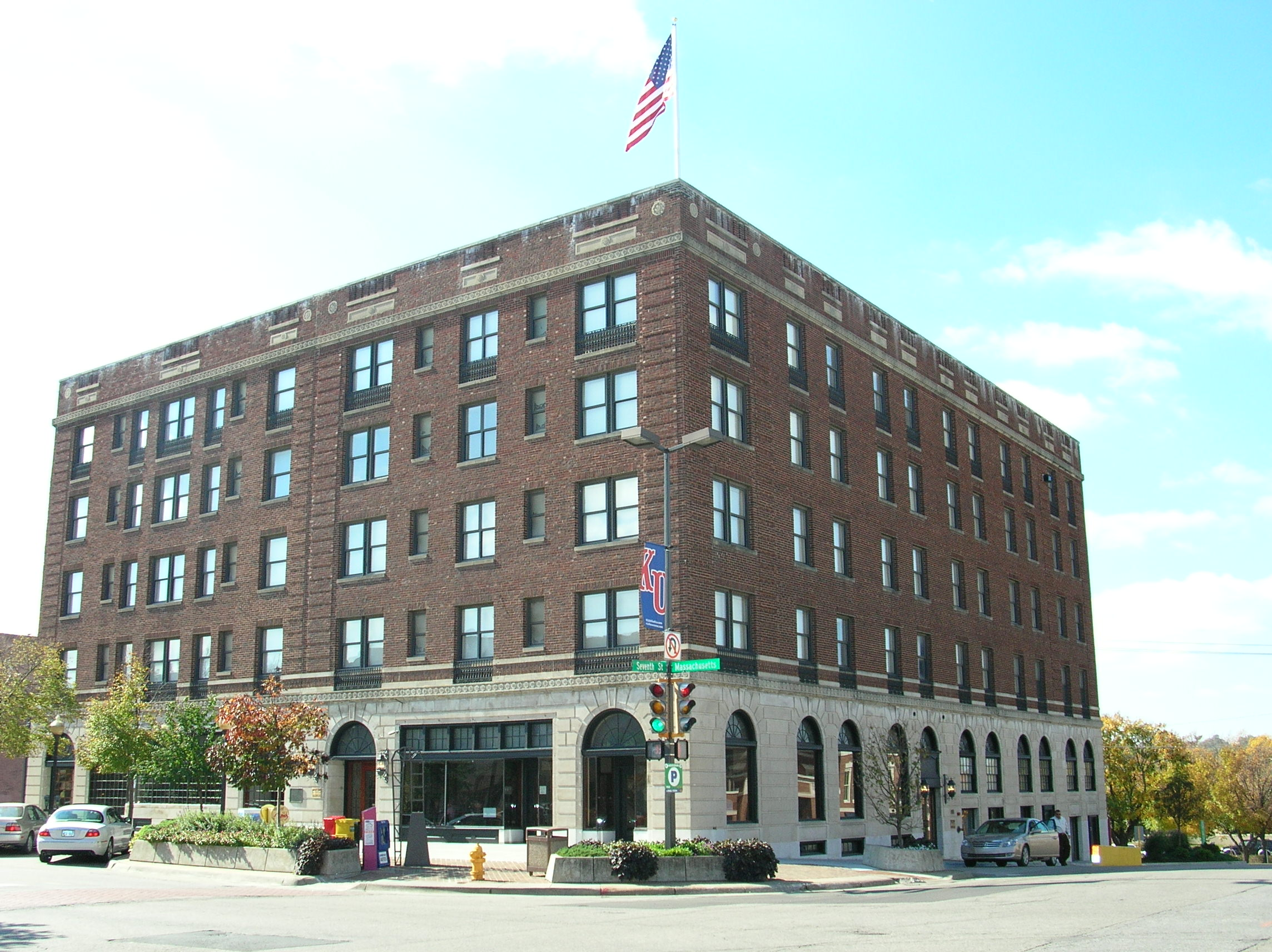
- The Eldridge House Hotel, looking southwest

- Location within Kansas
- Location: 701 Massachusetts St, Lawrence, Kansas
- Coordinates: 38°58′15.616″N 95°14′10.696″W
- Architect: Shepard & Wiser, Mont John Green
- Architectural style: Late 19th and 20th Century Revivals
- NRHP reference No.: 86003278
- Added to NRHP: December 1, 1986

The Eldridge House Hotel (often referred to as the Eldridge Hotel or simply the Eldridge) is a historic building located on Massachusetts Street, in downtown Lawrence, Kansas. The building is named after Shalor Eldridge, a prominent anti-slavery individual who erected the building in the mid-1800s. The building, as its contemporary name suggests, is currently used as a hotel.

== History ==
The Eldridge House Hotel can trace its origin back to the New England Emigrant Aid Company, which was a transportation company in Boston, Massachusetts, created after the passing of the Kansas-Nebraska act to bring anti-slavery immigrants to the Kansas Territory. The company erected a temporary way station in Lawrence for these settlers, named the Free State Hotel. On May 21, 1856, Douglas County sheriff Samuel J. Jones and a large group of pro-slavery men arrived in Lawrence and burned down the Free State Hotel as part of the Sack of Lawrence. After this disaster, the abolitionist individual Shalor Eldridge built a new hotel, which he named the Eldridge House, after himself. This structure stood until August 21, 1863, when Confederate irregular leader William Quantrill and his raiders burned the hotel, along with the city, to the ground.

Eldridge began to build another replacement hotel, which was finished in 1866 under George W. Deitzler. In 1925, this structure was rebuilt in its current form; the new building lasted as a hotel use until the mid-to-late 1960s, when it closed due to competition with motels. While the Eldridge Hotel building became an apartment complex on July 1, 1970, there was a strong desire in the city to see the Eldridge re-open as a hotel again in the 1980s. Soon, a group of investors raised $1 million, and the city of Lawrence also contributed $2 million in industrial revenue bonds to make this dream a reality. In the later part of that decade, the entire structure was retrofitted once again into a hotel. In 2004, the hotel was purchased by a new group of investors and completely renovated once again, restoring it "to its original 1925 grandeur." The hotel opened the following year.

== Haunted reputation ==
A popular story has circulated that the ghost of Shalor Eldridge still haunts the hotel. Believers claim that, because the Eldridge House's original cornerstone is located in the room 506, Eldridge's spirit will manifest in that room. Others claim that the hotel's elevator is haunted by a spirit. A photograph taken during the 1980s purportedly depicts the ghost in the building's elevator. The Eldridge Hotel and the supposed ghost of its namesake were the partial subject of "The Demon Shadow" (2011), the first episode of the third season of the Biography Channel series My Ghost Story. The supposed haunting has also been the subject of several book chapters and book sections.

== Gallery ==
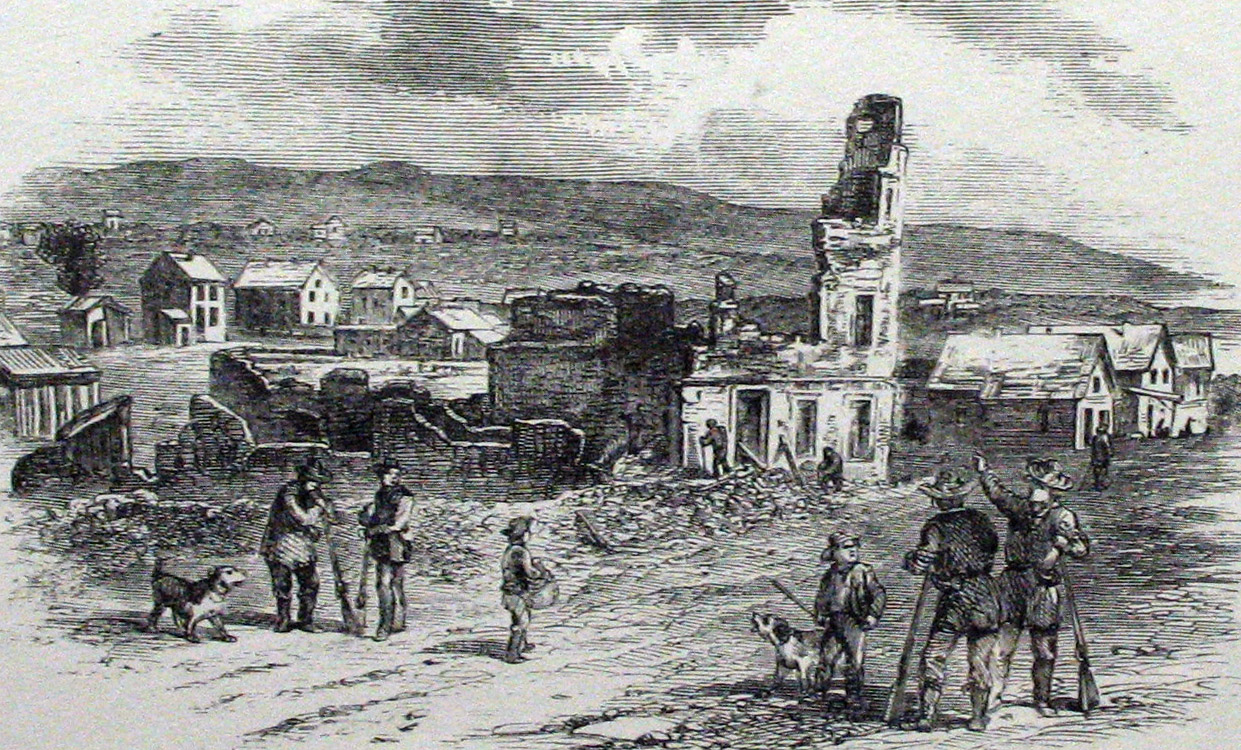
Ruins of Free State Hotel after the 1856 Sacking of Lawrence.

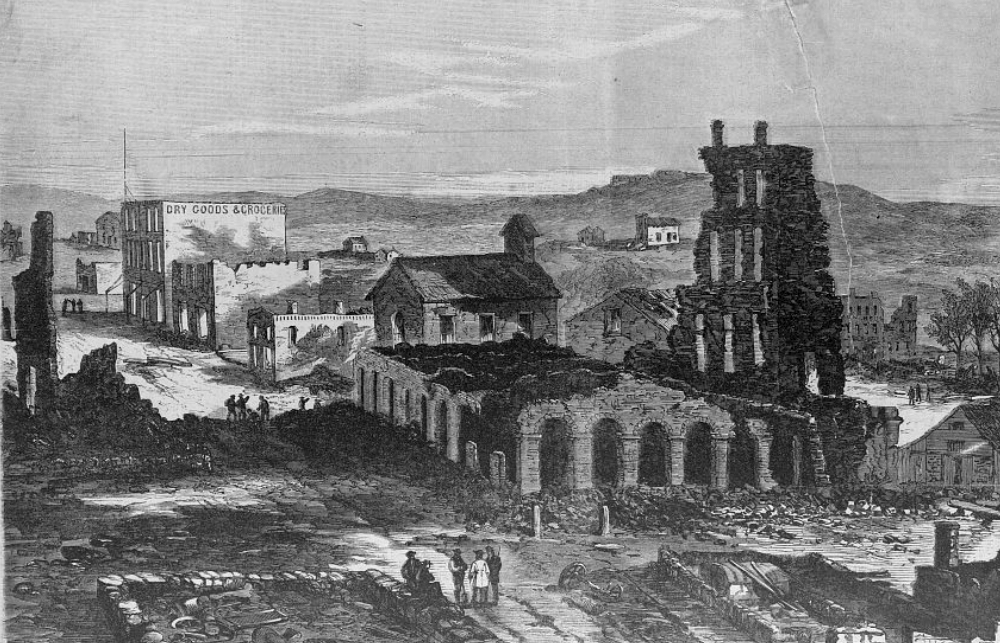
Lawrence in ruins, following Quantrill's Raid, as illustrated in Harper's Weekly. The ruins of the Eldridge House are in the foreground.

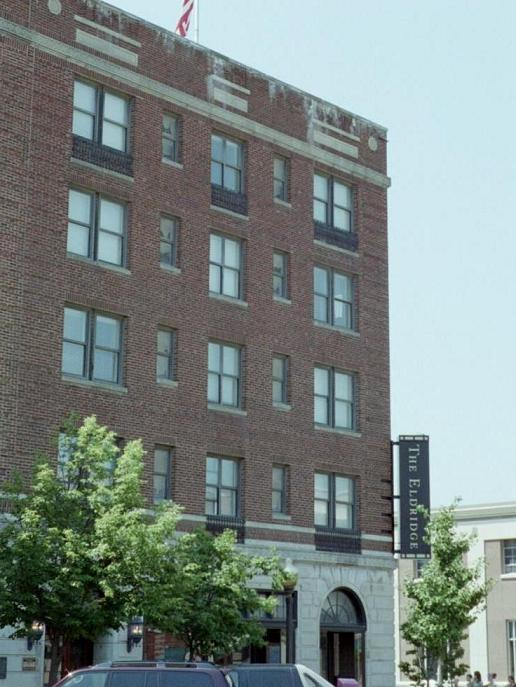
A contemporary view of the Eldridge Hotel, facing northwest.

== See also ==
- List of reportedly haunted locations in the United States
