= Samuel J. Jones =

American frontier settler

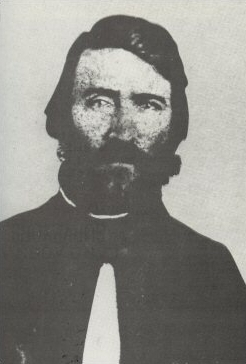

Postmaster of Westport, Missouri
- In office Pre-1855 – February 1, 1856

Sheriff of Douglas County, Kansas
- In office November 21, 1855 – January 7, 1857 (Note: Some sources suggest that Jones resigned in October or December 1856, rather than at the start of 1857.)
- Succeeded by: William T. Sherrard (Note: William T. Sherrard, a pro-slavery settler, was appointed by the legislature to be Jones's successor as the sheriff of Douglas County. However, Territorial Governor of Kansas John W. Geary refused to approve his appointment. Sherrard was eventually killed in a shoot-out, and the position was assumed by Harrison Hutcher in July 1857.)

Personal details
- Born: Samuel Jefferson Jones; April 16, 1827 Virginia, US
- Died: December 10, 1883 (aged 56) Mesilla, New Mexico
- Spouse: Mary Jones

Samuel Jefferson Jones (April 16, 1827 – December 10, 1883) was a pro-slavery settler who held the position of Douglas County sheriff in Kansas Territory from late 1855 until early 1857. He helped found the territorial capital of Lecompton and played a prominent role in the "Bleeding Kansas" conflict, leading the Sacking of Lawrence in 1856.

In 1858, he moved to La Mesilla, New Mexico Territory. In September of that year, he was appointed the collector of customs at El Paso del Norte (now Ciudad Juárez, Mexico). In New Mexico, he was involved with the Mowry City land scam. When that settlement's prospects collapsed, he bought a ranch near La Mesilla and died there in 1883. His tombstone was returned to Lecompton in 2013.

== Biography ==
=== Move to Kansas ===
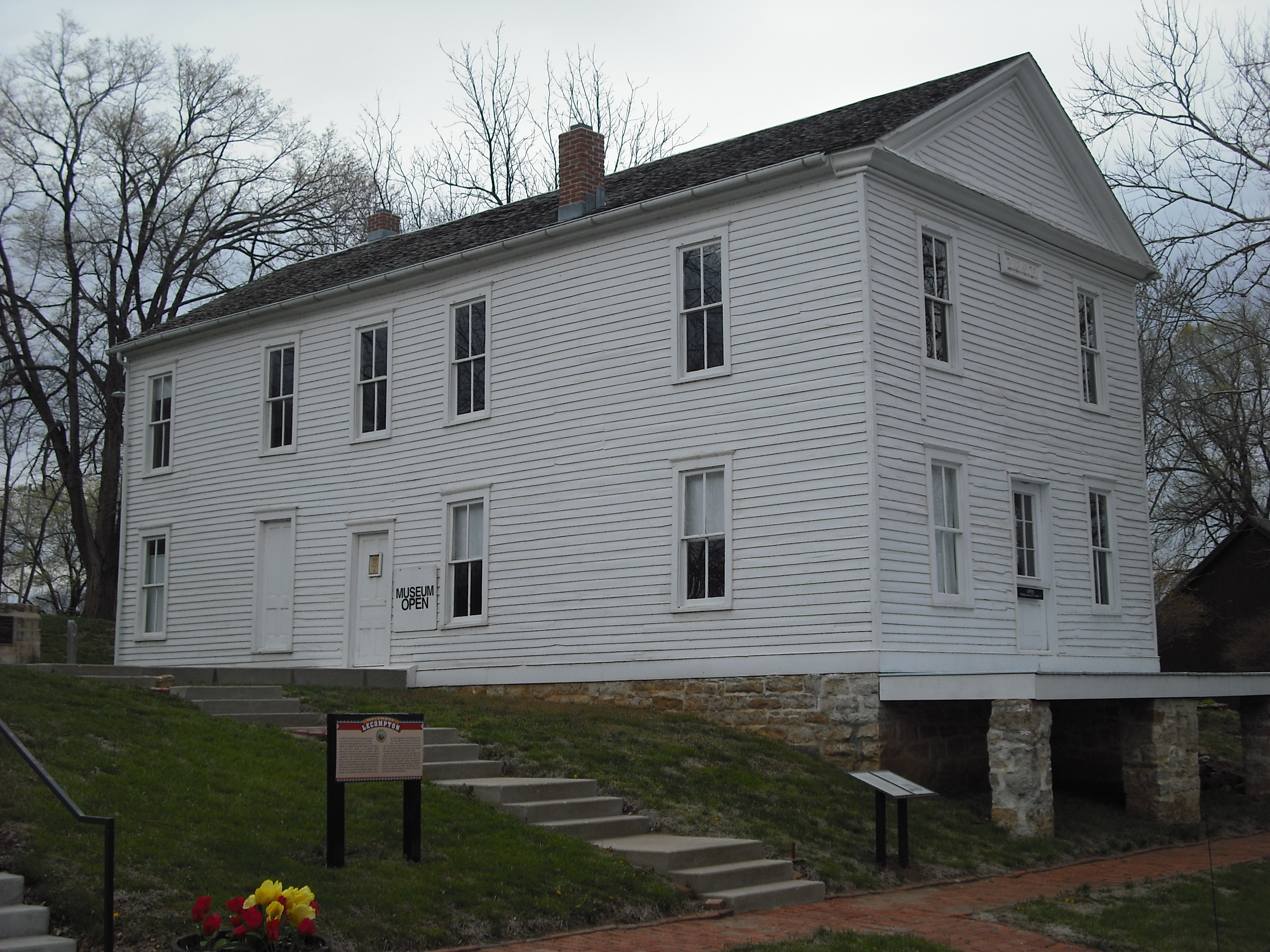
Jones erected Constitution Hall in Lecompton, Kansas, which he rented out to the local pro-slavery government.

Jones was a native of the state of Virginia. He served Westport, Missouri, as a postmaster before moving with his family to the newly-opened Kansas Territory in about 1854. There, he befriended many pro-slavery settlers, and on March 30, 1855, he had a hand in disrupting elections in Bloomington, Kansas. On August 27, 1855, acting territorial governor of the Kansas Territory Daniel Woodson appointed Jones as the first sheriff of Douglas County. Jones journeyed to the territorial capital of Lecompton and erected Constitution Hall, which he rented out to the local pro-slavery government.

=== The Wakarusa War ===
On November 21, 1855, the pro-slavery settler Franklin Coleman shot and killed the Free Stater Charles Dow at Hickory Point (about 14 miles (23 km) south of Lawrence) because of a land claim. Coleman argued that he had been acting in self-defense when he killed Dow, and simultaneously sought an arrest warrant for one of Dow's friends, a Free-Stater named Jacob Branson, who had witnessed the murder, apparently in an attempt to thwart Branson's threatened retaliation. When Jones investigated, he chose not to arrest Coleman for Dow's murder but instead arrested Branson on charges of disturbing the peace. Branson, however, was eventually rescued by free-staters, causing the pro-slavery faction to seethe with anger. Within a matter of days, the governor of the Kansas Territory, Wilson Shannon, called for the Kansas militia to settle the issue. Understandably, Shannon had intended for the militia to be composed of Kansans, but Jones mustered a small army of 1,500 pro-slavery men, most of whom were from Missouri. The group, led by Jones, made their way to Lawrence with the intention of eradicating the free-staters. Meanwhile, the citizens of Lawrence, bracing for the impending battle, raised up a militia of 800 men. But despite the mustering of armies, the Missourians never attacked, and the pro- and anti-slavery factions were encouraged by the governor to make peace in December 1855. Soon thereafter, the Missouri army reluctantly left the area.

=== Sack of Lawrence ===
On April 23, 1856, Sheriff Jones entered into Lawrence and attempted to arrest members of the extralegal Free-State legislature. Jones's presence in the city caused emotions to flare, and soon, violence erupted; according to author Duane Schutlz, "One man grabbed [Jones] by the collar; another punched him in the face." Jones retreated, but returned later with a small group of soldiers serving as back-up. Their presence did little to quell the citizens of the town, who quickly grabbed their guns and began to fire at the sheriff. A bullet eventually struck Jones, which rendered him for a time partially paralyzed, and although he survived the assassination attempt, rumors quickly spread that he had been killed. After the shoot-out, Federal Marshal J. B. Donaldson proclaimed on May 11 that the act had interfered with the execution of warrants. This led to a grand jury declaring that Lawrence's Free State Hotel was actually built to use as a fort. Consequently, Sheriff Jones—who, in addition to his desire to uphold the pro-slavery laws, had an ax to grind with the free-staters—assembled an army of about 800 southern settlers to enter Lawrence, disarm the citizens, destroy the anti-slavery presses, and dismantle the Free State Hotel. This occurred on May 21, when Sheriff Jones and a gang of Southern sympathizers sacked Lawrence. Dr. Robinson’s house on Mount Oread was taken by the federal marshal as headquarters (before being razed), the newspaper printing presses were destroyed, the Free State Hotel was burned down, and the town was looted.

On January 7, 1857, Jones resigned as sheriff of Douglas County "because [territorial governor John W. Geary] would not furnish him with balls and chains for certain free-state prisoners." He soon thereafter left Kansas Territory altogether.

=== New Mexico Territory ===
Jones moved to La Mesilla, New Mexico Territory in 1858. In September of that year, he was appointed the collector of customs at Paso del Norte.

In 1859, Jones and two partners, Lewis S. Owings and Robert P. Kelley, owned a number of businesses in the town and also had interests in mining properties. They realized that the existing population base was too small for them to attain the prosperity they desired, so they concocted a scheme to establish a town site and promote it, to draw settlers into the area. Trading on the fame and name recognition among eastern investors of Sylvester Mowry, these promoters chose "Mowry City" as the name for their new town. The three collaborated on a misleading pamphlet entitled "Report of the Mowry City Association, Territory of Arizona, for 1859", which exaggerated Mowry City's mineral resources and claimed that it would be the future site of the territorial capital of Arizona Territory (at that time, the name "Arizona" was applied to the southern half of New Mexico Territory, from the Staked Plains of Texas to the Colorado River border of California). After gold was discovered in 1860 near Pinos Altos, Mowry City started to grow, but the Bascom Affair and the outbreak of the American Civil War led to nearby Apache peoples attacking all white settlers, including those in Mowry City. This led to the end of the settlement.

Around this time, Jones bought a ranch near La Mesilla. In the summer of 1879, he suffered a stroke and died some time after, according to William A. Phillips.

== Post-mortem ==
The La Mesilla cemetery in which Jones's body had been buried closed in 1930, and his corpse was carted off to the Odd Fellow Cemetery in Las Cruces, New Mexico. However, his La Mesilla tombstone was left in place, and over the years, fell into disrepair. In 2013, the genealogist Shirley Funk discovered the location of Jones's long-lost burial marker and arranged for it to be transported to Lecompton. Over the years, it had been broken to pieces, necessitating that it be reconstructed. The stone now lies near Constitution Hall in Lecompton.

== Bibliography ==
- Adams, F. G., ed. (1896). Transactions of the Kansas State Historical Society. Vol. 5. Kansas State Historical Society.
- Andreas, Alfred Theodore (1883). History of the State of Kansas. Chicago, IL: A. T.
- Ball, Durwood (2001). Army Regulars on the Western Frontier, 1848–1861. Norman, Oklahoma: University of Oklahoma Press. p. 174.
- Blackmar, Frank (1912). "Wakarusa War". Kansas: A Cyclopedia of State History. Vol. 2. Chicago, IL: Standard Publishing Company. pp. 855–857.
- Connelley, W.E. (1912). A Standard History of Kansas and Kansans. Vol. 2. Chicago, IL: Standard Publishing Company.
- Finch, L. Boyd (1990). A Southwestern Land Scam: The 1859 Report of the 'Mowry City Association'.
- Litteer, Leron (1987). 'Bleeding Kansas': The Border War in Douglas and Adjacent Counties. Baldwin City, KS: Champion Publishing.
- Mayo, Matthew (August 4, 2015). Hornswogglers, Fourflushers & Snake-Oil Salesmen: True Tales of the Old West's Sleaziest Swindlers. Lanham, Maryland: Rowman & Littlefield. ISBN 9781493018048.
- Monaghan, Jay (1984). Civil War on the Western Border, 1854–1865. Lincoln, Nebraska: University of Nebraska Press.
- Palmquist, Peter E.; Kailbourn, Thomas R. (2005). Pioneer Photographers from the Mississippi to the Continental Divide: A Biographical Dictionary, 1839-1865. Palo Alto, California: Stanford University Press. ISBN 9780804740579.
- Schultz, Duane (1997). Quantrill's War: The Life & Times Of William Clarke Quantrill, 1837–1865. New York City, NY: St. Martin's Press. ISBN 9780312169725.
- Stampp, Kenneth M. (1992). America in 1857: A Nation on the Brink. Oxford, UK: Oxford University Press. ISBN 9780199729036.
- Whitfield, Steve (2014). Kansas Paper Money: An Illustrated History, 1854–1935. Jefferson, NC: McFarland & Company. ISBN 9780786454266.
