= Sacking of Lawrence =

1856 destruction of the Kansas Territory town

Coordinates: 38.9714936°N 95.235975°W

- Part of Bleeding Kansas
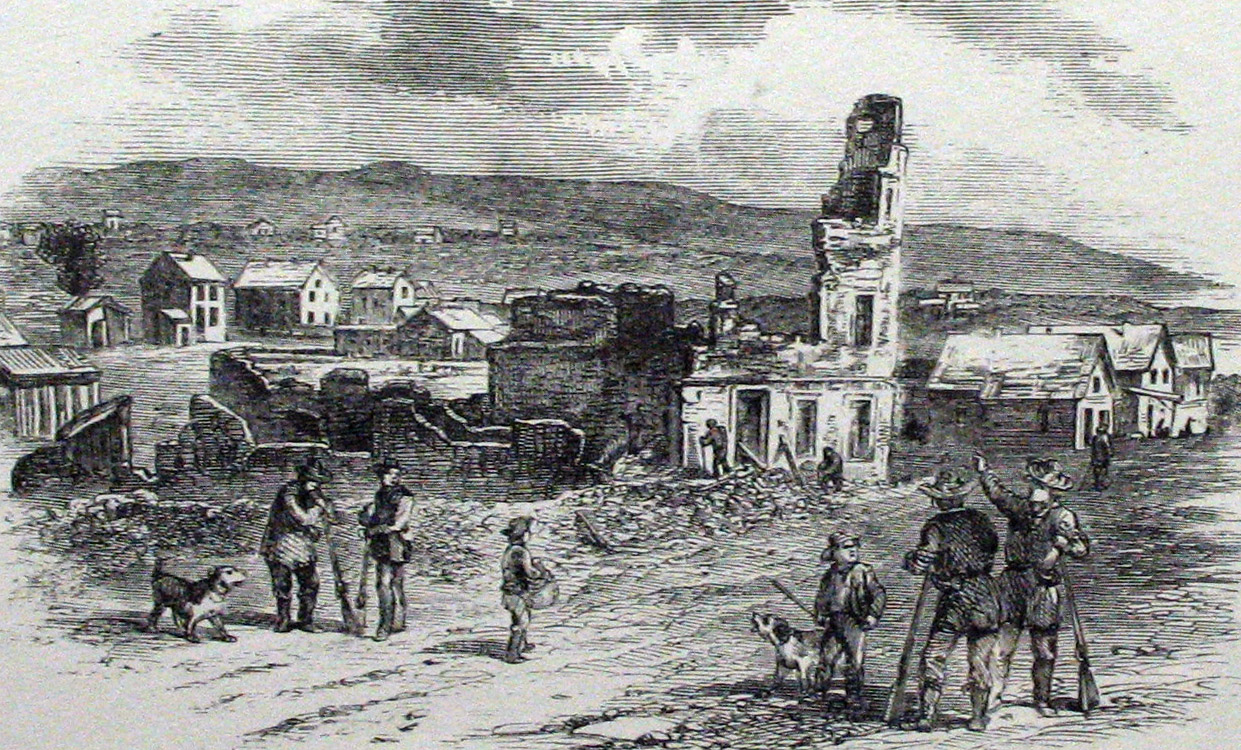
- Ruins of Free State Hotel after the attack
Date	May 21, 1856
Location	Douglas County, Kansas
Result	Border ruffian victory: Production of Kansas Free State ended; production of Herald of Freedom temporarily halted; Free State Hotel and Charles L. Robinson's house destroyed; Lawrence looted

Belligerents
Free-Staters	Border ruffians

Commanders and leaders
Samuel C. Pomeroy (de facto)	Samuel J. Jones

Strength
Abolitionist civilians	800

Casualties and losses
1 wounded	1 dead

The sacking of Lawrence occurred on May 21, 1856, when pro-slavery settlers, led by Douglas County Sheriff Samuel J. Jones, attacked and ransacked Lawrence, Kansas, a town that had been founded by anti-slavery settlers from Massachusetts who were hoping to make Kansas a free state. The incident fueled the irregular conflict in Kansas Territory that later became known as Bleeding Kansas.

The human cost of the attack was low: only one person—a member of the pro-slavery gang—was killed, and his death was accidental. However, Jones and his men halted production of the Free-State newspapers the Kansas Free State and the Herald of Freedom, destroying the presses and offices (with the former ceasing publication altogether and the latter taking months to once again start up). The pro-slavery gunmen also destroyed the Free State Hotel and Charles L. Robinson's house.

== Background ==
Lawrence was founded in 1854 by antislavery settlers from Massachusetts, many of whom received financial support from the New England Emigrant Aid Company. The town was the de facto headquarters of Free-State Kansas, which led to its becoming the epicenter of violence in the territory. The many pro-slavery settlers in eastern Kansas loathed the Free-State residents of the town (and vice versa). While the village had nearly been raided during the so-called Wakarusa War in December 1855, it was not directly attacked at that time.

Abolitionists and Free-Staters at the time saw the sack as a reply to the non-fatal shooting on April 23, 1856, of Douglas County Sheriff Samuel J. Jones, who was in Lawrence attempting to arrest Free-State settlers under the premise of events during the Wakarusa War. Lawrence residents drove Jones out of town after they shot him. On May 11, Federal Marshal Israel B. Donalson proclaimed that the "assassination attempt" had interfered with the execution of warrants against the extralegal Free-State legislature, which was set up in opposition to the official pro-slavery or "bogus" territorial government.

PROCLAMATION
To The People of Kansas Territory

Whereas, Certain judicial arrests have been directed to me by the First District Court of the United States, etc., to be executed within the county of Douglas, and whereas an attempt to execute them by the United States Deputy Marshal was evidently resisted by a large number of the people of Lawrence, and as there is every reason to believe that any attempt to execute these writs will be resisted by a large body of armed men; now, therefore, the law-abiding citizens of the Territory are commanded to be and appear at Lecompton, as soon as practicable, and in numbers sufficient for the execution of the law.
Given under my hand this 11th day of May, 1856
I. B. Donalson,
United States Marshal of the Territory of Kansas
P. S.—No liability for expenses will be incurred by the United States until its consent is obtained.

Donalson's proclamation and the presentment by the first district of Kansas's grand jury that "the building known as the 'Free State' Hotel' [sic] in Lawrence had been constructed with a view to military occupation and defense, regularly parapeted and portholed, for the use of cannon and small arms, thereby endangering the public safety, and encouraging rebellion and sedition in this country" enabled Sheriff Jones and Marshal Donalson assembling an army of roughly 800 Southern settlers. This group planned to enter Lawrence, disarm the citizens, destroy the antislavery newspapers, and level the Free State Hotel.

== Sack ==
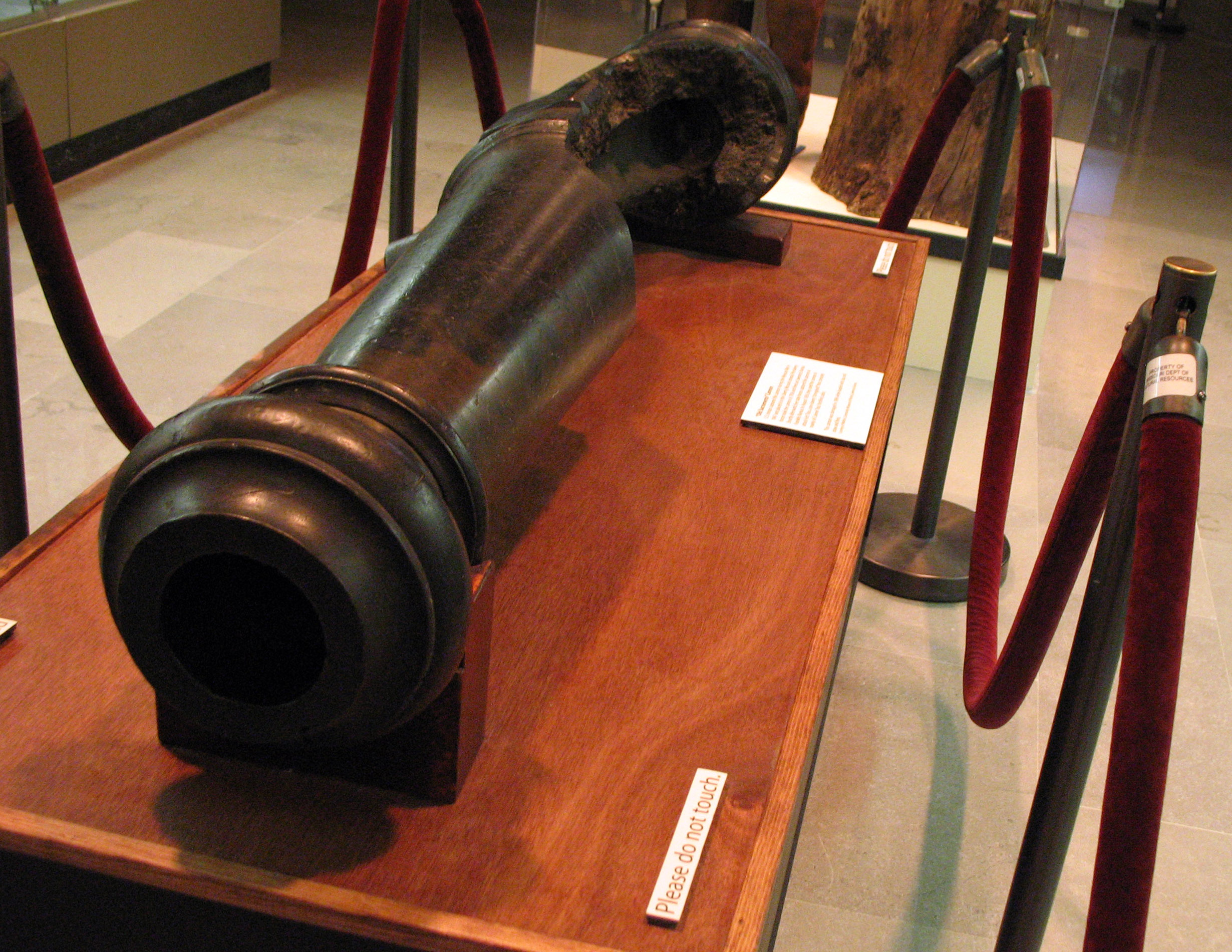
The "Old Sacramento" cannon was captured by the U.S. during the Mexican–American War in 1847 and taken to the Liberty Arsenal. The cannon was fired by pro-slavery forces during the Sack of Lawrence.

On May 21, 1856, Jones and Donalson neared the town. A large force was stationed on the high ground at Hogback Ridge, and a cannon was placed to cover and command the area. The house of Charles L. Robinson (later to become the first governor of Kansas) was taken over as Jones's headquarters. Every road to the town and on the opposite side of the river was guarded by Jones's men, to prevent the free-soilers from fleeing. Several flags were flown by Jones's men, such as the state banners of Alabama and South Carolina, a flag with black and white stripes, and flags bearing pro-slavery, inflammatory inscriptions, such as "Southern Rights" and "Supremacy of the White Race").

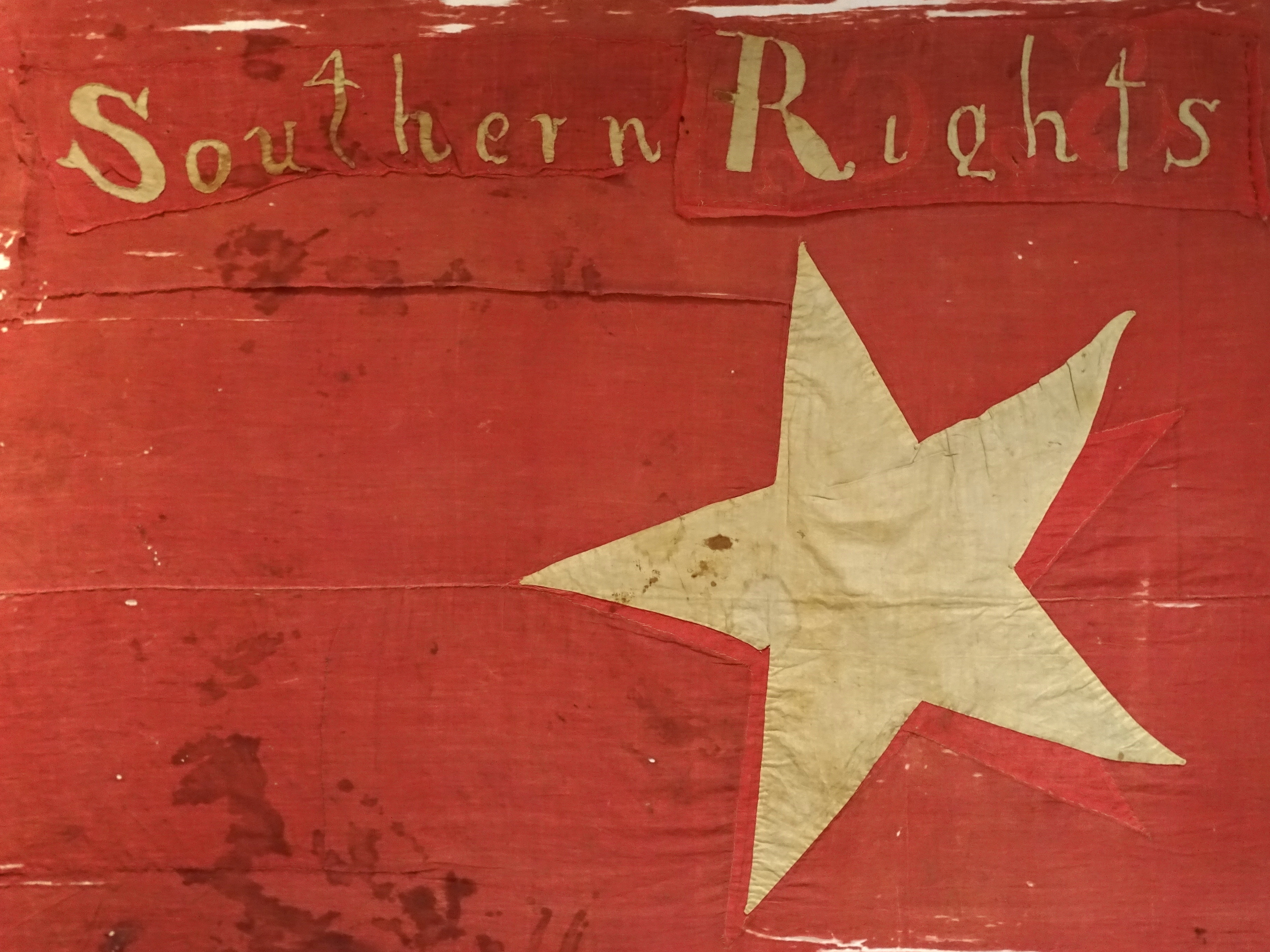
South Carolina flag flown over Free State Hotel

Shalor Eldridge, proprietor of the Free State Hotel, soon learned of the oncoming forces, and he journeyed out to meet them; he was told by Donalson that the posse would enter into Lawrence and attack if and only if the citizens tried to resist Donalson and Jones's men. Donalson and Eldridge then journeyed to the hotel, where, according to The New York Times, Eldridge had prepared "an elegant dinner, the best that the fresh and abundant stores in the cellar could afford" (which included "costly wines") so as to placate the marshal and his men. Eldridge was interviewed by Donalson while the federal agent and his followers ravenously consumed the meal, then left without paying. Shortly afterwards, the marshal dismissed his followers, who were immediately deputized by Jones. Jones then asked to speak to a representative of the town. Samuel C. Pomeroy (who, along with Charles Robinson, had led the second group of settlers to the Lawrence city site in 1854) agreed to meet with the sheriff and discuss with him the situation at hand. Jones was clear in what he wanted: for the citizens of Lawrence to surrender all of their weapons. Pomeroy replied that he did not have the power to do this, as it was ultimately up to individual citizens to give up their arms. However, hoping to encourage Jones to leave the city peacefully, Pomeroy agreed to turn over the city's only artillery piece. While Jones did seize this cannon, it did not appease him, as Pomeroy had hoped. According to the Lawrence minister Richard Cordley:

As soon as Jones had possession of the cannon and other arms, he proceeded to carry out his purpose to destroy the Free-State Hotel. He gave the inmates till five o’clock to get out their personal effects. When all was ready he (Note: Some sources maintain that it was not Jones who fired the first shot, but rather David Rice Atchison. However, being inebriated, he aimed the cannon too high, and the shot missed the building.) turned [the posse's very own] cannon upon the hotel and fired. The first ball went completely over the roof, at which all the people cheered, much to the disgust of Jones. The next shot hit the walls but did little damage. After bombarding away with little or no effect till it was becoming monotonous, they attempted to blow up the building with a keg of powder. But this only made a big noise and a big smoke, and did not do much towards demolishing the house. At every failure the citizen spectators along the street set up a shout. At last Jones became desperate, and applied the vulgar torch, and burned the building to the ground. [...] Jones was exultant. His revenge was complete. "This is the happiest moment of my life," he shouted as the walls of the hotel fell. He had made the "fanatics bow to him in the dust." He then dismissed his posse and left.

It was the "Old Sacramento" cannon that the pro-slavery forces made use of in their initial attempt to bring down the Free State Hotel. This weapon had been stored at the Liberty Arsenal until then. The cannon would be recaptured by free-staters on August 12, 1856, during the Second Battle of Franklin.

While Jones and his men were trying to bring down the hotel, the printing offices of the Kansas Free State and the Herald of Freedom newspapers were destroyed. The machinery was smashed, the type was thrown in the river, their libraries were thrown out the window, and loose copies were either thrown into the wind to be carried off, or used by Jones's party to set fire to the Free State Hotel. When the newspapers were obliterated and the hotel had been brought to the ground, Jones's men then looted the half-deserted town. As they retreated, for good measure they burned Robinson's home on Hogback Ridge.

One person—a member of Jones's gang—died during the attack, when he was struck in the head by a collapsing bit of the Free State Hotel.

After "Old Sacramento" was recaptured, the free-stater Thomas Bickerton scavenged the lead type from the river and used it to make cannonballs.

== Aftermath ==
The Free State Hotel was destroyed, and Shalor Eldridge purchased the charred remnants of the structure and rebuilt it as the "Eldridge House". This building remained a fixture of Lawrence until 1863, when it was burned down by William Quantrill during the Lawrence Massacre, and then it was rebuilt twice in 1866 and in 1926.

For months after the Sack of Lawrence, the city was without a free state newspaper. This was exacerbated by the fact that Josiah Miller, who ran the Kansas Free State, decided not to start his former paper up again. The lack of a Lawrence-based news source ended when George Brown restarted the Herald of Freedom in November.

The Sack of Lawrence resulted in the loss of the city's only cannon. This was at least one reason that Free-Staters attacked Franklin's Fort in June and August 1856, as they hoped to secure the "Old Sacramento" cannon for their own use.

== See also ==
- Bleeding Kansas
- Kansas–Nebraska Act
- List of battles fought in Kansas
