= Free-Stater (Kansas) =

Anti-Slavery organization

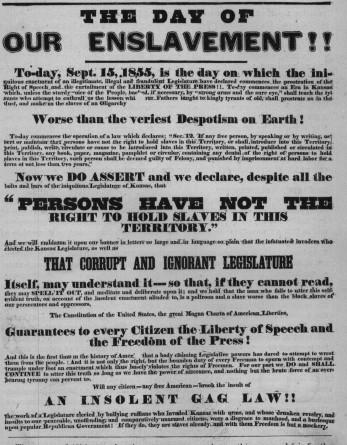
1855 Free-State poster in Kansas Territory, calling for action against slavery supporters and slavery-supporting laws

Free-Staters was the name given to settlers in Kansas Territory during the "Bleeding Kansas" period in the 1850s who opposed the expansion of slavery. The name derives from the term "free state", that is, a U.S. state without slavery. Many of the "free-staters" joined the Jayhawkers in their fight against slavery and to make Kansas a free state.

== Overview ==
Many Free-Staters were abolitionists from New England, in part because there was an organized emigration of settlers to Kansas Territory arranged by the New England Emigrant Aid Company beginning in 1854. Other Free-Staters were abolitionists who came to Kansas Territory from Ohio, Iowa, and other midwestern states. Holton, Kansas, was named for the Milwaukee, Wisconsin free-stater Edward Dwight Holton. What united the Free-Staters was a desire to defeat the southern, pro-slavery settlers in Kansas Territory on the question of whether Kansas would be admitted to the Union as a slave state. (The Kansas–Nebraska Act of 1854 had left the question open to the settlers in the territory.) Bastions for the free-state movement in Kansas included major towns and cities like Lawrence, Eudora, Baldwin City, Osawatomie, Ozawkie, Burlingame, Mound City and Topeka, among others.

As time passed and the violence in Bleeding Kansas escalated, the Free-State movement became more popular. In 1858, the Free-Staters proposed a second constitution, the Leavenworth Constitution, which banned slavery and also would have given the right to vote to black men, though this constitution also failed because the US Senate did not ratify it. Kansas became a state January 29, 1861, after a free state constitution (from a conference in Wyandotte in 1859) was adopted. The Confederate States of America seceded in the next month and Jefferson Davis was sworn in as their president February 18, 1861.

== See also ==
- Santa Fe Trail (film)
- Lawrence Free State High School
