= Popular sovereignty in the United States =

Doctrine in the United States

Popular sovereignty is the principle that the leaders of a state and its government are created and sustained by the consent of its people, who are the source of all political legitimacy. Citizens may unite and offer to delegate a portion of their sovereign powers and duties to those who wish to serve as officers of the state, contingent on the officers agreeing to serve according to the will of the people. In the United States, the term has been used to express this concept in constitutional law. It was also used during the 19th century in reference to a proposed solution to the debate over the expansion of slavery in the United States. The proposal would have given the power to determine the legality of slavery to the inhabitants of the territory seeking statehood, rather than to Congress.

== History ==
=== 18th century ===
In 18th-century European political thought, "the people" excluded most of the population; suffrage was denied to women, slaves, indentured servants, those lacking sufficient property, indigenous people and the young. The early American republic similarly disenfranchised women and those lacking sufficient property, also denying citizenship to slaves and other non-whites. According to historian Ronald Formisano, "Assertions of the peoples' sovereignty over time contained an unintended dynamic of raising popular expectations for a greater degree of popular participation and that the peoples' will be satisfied." The American contribution was clearer translation of these ideas into a formal structure of government. Many societies had experienced government as an inheritance—as monarchies or other expressions of power.

The American Enlightenment marked a departure in the concept of popular sovereignty as it had been discussed and employed in the European historical context. American revolutionaries aimed to substitute the sovereignty in the person of King George III, with a collective sovereign—composed of the people. Thenceforth, American revolutionaries generally agreed with and were committed to the principle that governments were legitimate only if they rested on popular sovereignty – that is, the sovereignty of the people. This was often linked with the notion of the consent of the governed—the idea of the people as a sovereign—and had clear 17th- and 18th-century intellectual roots in English history.

The concept unified and divided post-Revolutionary American thinking about government and the basis of the Union. Questions were raised over its precise meaning, permissible actions and the will of a collective sovereign. In an argument echoed by his students, for example, historian Bernard Bailyn contended that early state jurisdiction over certain colleges had been done "in the name of the People...But who were the People? A handful of legislators?...But what was the State in a republican government? Should it have powers against the people themselves?"

== Regarding slavery ==
Between 1835 and 1845 the country became progressively more polarized over the issue of slavery. Debate focused on the extension of slavery: whether it would be permitted, protected, abolished, or perpetuated in the newly acquired Louisiana Purchase and Mexican Cession territories. Attempts to resolve the issue in Congress led to gridlock. Several Congressional leaders, in an effort to resolve the deadlock over slavery as a condition for admission or administration of the territories, searched for a middle ground.

To some moderates, slavery in the territories was not a matter for Congress to resolve; they argued that the people in each territory, like those in each American state, were the sovereigns thereof and should determine the status of slavery. Popular sovereignty became part of the rhetoric for leaving to residents of the new American territories the decision to accept or reject slavery; this would resolve the expansion of slavery in the United States. This formed a middle ground between proponents of a limitation on slavery's spread to the territories and those opposing limitations, tying into the widespread American assumption that the people were sovereign.

According to historian Michael Morrison, the "idea of local self-determination, or, as it would become known, popular sovereignty" first began to occupy the attention of Congress in 1846 and 1847. In modern historiography, Illinois senator Stephen A. Douglas is most closely associated with popular sovereignty as a solution to the extension of slavery in the territories. Douglas's biographer, historian Robert W. Johannsen, wrote that Douglas was

chairman of the Committee on Territories in both the House and Senate, and he discharged the responsibilities of his position with single-minded devotion. ... During the debates over the organization of the Mexican Cession, Douglas evolved his doctrine of popular sovereignty, and from that time on it was irrevocably linked to his interest in the territories and in the West. His commitment to popular sovereignty was the deeper because he recognized in it a formula that would (he hoped) bridge the differences between the North and South on the slavery question, thus preserving the Union.

The term "popular sovereignty" was not coined by Douglas; in connection with slavery in the territories, it was first used by presidential candidate and Michigan senator Lewis Cass in his 1847 Nicholson Letter. Today it is more closely associated with Douglas, and its connection to the failed attempt to accommodate slavery gave the term its present pejorative connotation. Douglas "ultimately became the victim of the very politics he sought to remove from territorial policy" by advancing the idea of popular sovereignty: "His efforts were not judged in terms of their impact on the needs and desires of the territories. ... Rather, they were appraised in terms of their relation to the power struggle between North and South and to the issue of slavery. Despite Douglas's intentions, the territories continued to be but pawns in a larger political controversy."

=== The Kansas–Nebraska Act ===
Popular sovereignty was put to the test by the Kansas–Nebraska Act of 1854. The residents of each territory were to determine the status of enslavement in their territory. In Nebraska there was little problem; Nebraska would be a free state. In the case of Kansas, which Southerners in Congress assumed would balance Nebraska as a new slave state, the result was "pure chaos".

No one had specified how eligible voters could be identified. Did they have to own property in Kansas? Did they have to have been residents of Kansas for some period of time? Pro-slavery settlers from the slave states of Missouri and Arkansas poured in, some intending to stay and many others to leave as soon as they had voted. The New England Emigrant Aid Company helped a smaller number of anti-slavery settlers move to Kansas from the northeast. Widespread fraudulent voting, as reported by Congressional investigators, produced the pro-slavery Lecompton Constitution. Free-staters produced the Topeka Constitution (which would have prohibited all Blacks, free as well as enslaved). Neither went into effect. They were followed by the Leavenworth Constitution and the Wyandotte Constitution. Kansas had four constitutions during the territorial period, along with two different governments in two different cities, the pro-slavery government in Lecompton, which the free-staters called "bogus" because it had not been chosen through honest elections, and a free-state government, first in Topeka and then in Lawrence. The desire to ban enslavement in Kansas was not just motivated by altruism; residents feared that slave owners would, as they did elsewhere, exercise disproportionate power.

The conflict soon turned violent; over 50 people were killed; Lawrence was sacked. John Brown and most of his sons moved to Kansas, and since he saw violence as both necessary and justifiable in fighting slavery, he pushed free-staters to resist the pro-slavery violence with some of their own. His party pulled five prominent pro-slavery men from their homes in the middle of the night, and killed them in the Pottawatomie Massacre.

In short, the concept of "popular sovereignty", which Lincoln called "a living, creeping lie", proved no solution to the slavery question in Kansas or anywhere else. The genuine residents of Kansas showed, when honest elections were held, that they overwhelmingly wanted it to be a free state. This was not the result the pro-slavery forces expected or wanted, and they had the votes to block Kansas's admission to the Union as a free state, so nothing was done. The issue was only resolved when Southern legislators either withdrew or were expelled from Congress in 1861, when seven Southern states announced their secession. This broke the impasse in Congress, and within days Kansas was admitted as a free state, under the Wyandotte Constitution.

== In constitutional law ==
The colonists' struggle for equality with the King of Great Britain was enshrined in the United States Declaration of Independence and was common knowledge in the United States after the American Revolution. Inaugural Chief Justice John Jay, in Chisholm v. Georgia (1793), illustrated what would come to be known as popular sovereignty:

It will be sufficient to observe briefly that the sovereignties in Europe, and particularly in England, exist on feudal principles. That system considers the Prince as the sovereign, and the people as his subjects; it regards his person as the object of allegiance, and excludes the idea of his being on an equal footing with a subject, either in a court of justice or elsewhere ... No such ideas obtain here; at the Revolution, the sovereignty devolved on the people, and they are truly the sovereigns of the country, but they are sovereigns without subjects, and have none to govern but themselves[.]

From the differences existing between feudal sovereignties and governments founded on compacts, it necessarily follows that their respective prerogatives must differ. Sovereignty is the right to govern; a nation or State sovereign is the person or persons in whom that resides. In Europe, the sovereignty is generally ascribed to the Prince; here, it rests with the people; there, the sovereign actually administers the government; here, never in a single instance; our Governors are the agents of the people, and, at most, stand in the same relation to their sovereign in which regents in Europe stand to their sovereigns.

Although each person is sovereign, that sovereignty is twofold. In private matters, such as one's body, life and holdings, they are akin to the monarchs of Europe; one exception is eminent domain. They are co-sovereign with the states and the Union in public property and interests, and are governed by elected representatives. This concept of public and private may be confusing to those unfamiliar with the principles. Public and private are mutually exclusive; that which is public is not private and vice versa. That which is public is of interest to all the people, but this was never intended to express (or imply) that the private sector was subject to the state. Even in the public sector, the people as a whole remain sovereign. In 1886, 93 years after the Supreme Court's ruling in Chisholm v. Georgia, Justice Stanley Matthews expressed this in Yick Wo v. Hopkins:

When we consider the nature and the theory of our institutions of government, the principles upon which they are supposed to rest, and review the history of their development, we are constrained to conclude that they do not mean to leave room for the play and action of purely personal and arbitrary power. Sovereignty itself is, of course, not subject to law, for it is the author and source of law; but, in our system, while sovereign powers are delegated to the agencies of government, sovereignty itself remains with the people, by whom and for whom all government exists and acts. And the law is the definition and limitation of power. It is, indeed, quite true that there must always be lodged somewhere, and in some person or body, the authority of final decision, and in many cases of mere administration, the responsibility is purely political, no appeal lying except to the ultimate tribunal of the public judgment, exercised either in the pressure of opinion or by means of the suffrage. But the fundamental rights to life, liberty, and the pursuit of happiness, considered as individual possessions, are secured by those maxims of constitutional law which are the monuments showing the victorious progress of the race in securing to men the blessings of civilization under the reign of just and equal laws, so that, in the famous language of the Massachusetts Bill of Rights, the government of the commonwealth "may be a government of laws, and not of men." For the very idea that one man may be compelled to hold his life, or the means of living, or any material right essential to the enjoyment of life at the mere will of another seems to be intolerable in any country where freedom prevails, as being the essence of slavery itself.

Legal historian Christian G. Fritz wrote in American Sovereigns: The People and America's Constitutional Tradition Before the Civil War that before and after the revolution, Americans believed "that the people in a republic, like a king in a monarchy, exercised plenary authority as the sovereign. This interpretation persisted from the revolutionary period up to the Civil War." Despite this widespread belief, the term "popular sovereignty" was infrequently used by the early Americans. In expressing the fundamental concept of rule by the people, they described an ideal of how the people would exercise sovereignty in the US and state officers and employees would be public servants. The phrase "popular sovereignty" did not become popular until the 1840s.

== See also ==
- Wilmot Proviso
