= State constitutions in the United States =

Constitution of a state in the United States of America

In the United States of America, each state has its own written constitution. The Supremacy Clause of the Constitution of the United States (Article VI, Clause 2) establishes that the Constitution, federal laws made pursuant to it, and treaties made under the authority of the United States, constitute the "supreme Law of the Land", and thus take priority over any conflicting state laws. It provides that state courts are bound by, and state constitutions subordinate to, the supreme law.

The Tenth Amendment to the United States Constitution (part of the Bill of Rights) provides that "The powers not delegated to the United States by the Constitution, nor prohibited by it to the States, are reserved to the States respectively, or to the people." The Guarantee Clause of Article 4 of the Constitution states that "The United States shall guarantee to every State in this Union a Republican Form of Government." These two provisions indicate states did not surrender their wide latitude to adopt a constitution, the fundamental documents of state law, when the U.S. Constitution was adopted.

State constitutions are much longer than the United States Constitution, which only contains 4,543 words. State constitutions are all longer than 8,000 words because they are more detailed regarding the day-to-day relationships between government and the people. The shortest is the Constitution of Vermont, adopted in 1793 and currently 8,295 words long. The longest is Alabama's constitution, rewritten in 2022, at about 370,000 words long. Both the federal and state constitutions are organic texts: they are the fundamental blueprints for the legal and political organizations of the United States and the states, respectively.

Typically state constitutions address a wide array of issues deemed by the states to be of sufficient importance to be included in the constitution rather than in an ordinary statute. Often modeled after the federal Constitution, they outline the structure of the state government and typically establish a bill of rights, an executive branch headed by a governor (and often one or more other officials, such as a lieutenant governor and state attorney general), a state legislature, and state courts, including a state supreme court (a few states have two high courts, one for civil cases, the other for criminal cases). They also provide general governmental framework for what each branch is supposed to do and how it should go about doing it. Additionally, many other provisions may be included. Many state constitutions, unlike the federal constitution, also begin with an invocation of God.

Some states allow amendments to the constitution by initiative.

Many states have had several constitutions over the course of their history.

The territories of the United States are "organized" and, thus, self-governing if the United States Congress has passed an Organic Act. Two of the 14 territories without commonwealth status—Guam and the United States Virgin Islands—are organized, but have not adopted their own constitutions. One unorganized territory, American Samoa, has its own constitution. The remaining 13 unorganized territories have no permanent populations and are either under direct control of the U.S. Government or operate as military bases.

The commonwealths of Puerto Rico and the Northern Mariana Islands (CNMI) do not have organic acts but operate under local constitutions. Pursuant to the acquisition of Puerto Rico under the Treaty of Paris, 1898, the relationship between Puerto Rico and the United States is controlled by Article IV of the United States Constitution and the Constitution of Puerto Rico. Constitutional law in the CNMI is based upon a series of constitutional documents, the most important of which are the 1976 Covenant to Establish a Commonwealth of the Northern Mariana Islands in political union with the United States of America, which controls the relationship between the CNMI and the United States; and the local commonwealth constitution, drafted in 1976, ratified by the people of the CNMI in March 1977, accepted by the United States Government in October 1977, and effective from 9 January 1978.

== List of constitutions ==
The following is a list of the current constitutions of the states in the United States. Each entry shows the ordinal number of the current constitution, the official name of the current constitution, the date on which the current constitution took effect, and the estimated length of the current constitution. Also below are a description of organic instruments with respect to additional territory.

Constitutions of states that were independent countries prior to admission, and constitutions used by rebelling states participating in the American Civil War are not counted.

General information on state constitutions
No.	Official name	Date of effect	Estimated length	Notes
7th	Constitution of the State of Alabama	November 28, 2022	402,852	(Note: Excludes the 2022 recodification of the Constitution of Alabama. The Constitution of Alabama is currently the longest active written constitution in the world, more than two-and-a-half times the length of the second-longest (the Constitution of India).)
1st	Constitution of the State of Alaska	January 3, 1959	13,479	
1st	Constitution of the State of Arizona	February 14, 1912	47,306	
4th	Constitution of the State of Arkansas	October 13, 1874	59,120	
2nd	Constitution of the State of California	January 1, 1880	76,930	
1st	Constitution of the State of Colorado	August 1, 1876	84,239	
2nd	Constitution of the State of Connecticut	December 30, 1965	16,401	
4th	Constitution of the State of Delaware	June 10, 1897	25,445	
6th	Constitution of the State of Florida	January 7, 1969	49,230	
10th	Constitution of the State of Georgia	July 1, 1983	41,684	
1st	Constitution of the State of Hawaii	August 21, 1959	21,498	(Note: Excludes the constitutions of the Kingdom of Hawaiʻi and the Republic of Hawaiʻi.)
1st	Constitution of the State of Idaho	July 3, 1890	24,626	
4th	Constitution of the State of Illinois	July 1, 1971	16,401	
2nd	Constitution of the State of Indiana	November 1, 1851	11,610	
2nd	Constitution of the State of Iowa	August 3, 1857	11,089	
1st	Constitution of the State of Kansas	January 29, 1861	14,097	(Note: The Wyandotte Constitution supplanted the rejected Topeka Constitution, Lecompton Constitution, and Leavenworth Constitution.)
4th	Constitution of the Commonwealth of Kentucky	August 3, 1891	27,234	
11th	Constitution of the State of Louisiana	January 1, 1975	76,730	
1st	Constitution of the State of Maine	March 3, 1820	16,313	(Note: Excludes the 1876 recodification of the Constitution of the State of Maine.)
4th	Constitution of the State of Maryland	October 5, 1867	43,198	
1st	Constitution of the Commonwealth of Massachusetts	October 25, 1780	45,283	(Note: The Constitution of Massachusetts is currently the world's oldest written constitution that is still in effect.)
4th	Constitution of the State of Michigan	January 1, 1964	31,164	
1st	Constitution of the State of Minnesota	May 11, 1858	12,016	
4th	Constitution of the State of Mississippi	November 1, 1890	26,229	
4th	Constitution of the State of Missouri	March 30, 1945	84,924	
2nd	Constitution of the State of Montana	July 1, 1973	12,790	
2nd	Constitution of the State of Nebraska	November 1, 1875	34,934	
1st	Constitution of the State of Nevada	October 31, 1864	37,418	
2nd	Constitution of the State of New Hampshire	June 2, 1784	13,238	(Note: The first Constitution of the State of New Hampshire, adopted on January 5, 1776, was the first written constitution for an independent state in the New World and set the stage for the United States Declaration of Independence the following summer.)
3rd	Constitution of the State of New Jersey	January 1, 1948	26,360	
1st	Constitution of the State of New Mexico	January 6, 1912	33,198	
4th	Constitution of the State of New York	January 1, 1895	49,360	(Note: Excludes the 1938 recodification of the Constitution of the State of New York.)
3rd	Constitution of the State of North Carolina	July 1, 1971	17,177	
1st	Constitution of the State of North Dakota	November 2, 1889	18,746	
2nd	Constitution of the State of Ohio	September 1, 1851	63,140	
1st	Constitution of the State of Oklahoma	November 16, 1907	84,956	
1st	Constitution of the State of Oregon	February 14, 1859	49,430	
4th	Constitution of the Commonwealth of Pennsylvania	January 1, 1874	26,078	(Note: Excludes the 1968 recodification of the Constitution of the Commonwealth of Pennsylvania.)
2nd	Constitution of the State of Rhode Island	January 20, 1987	11,407	
6th	Constitution of the State of South Carolina	January 1, 1896	27,421	
1st	Constitution of the State of South Dakota	November 2, 1889	28,840	
3rd	Constitution of the State of Tennessee	March 26, 1870	13,960	
4th	Constitution of the State of Texas	February 17, 1876	92,025	(Note: Excludes the constitutions of Coahuila y Tejas and of the Republic of Texas.)
1st	Constitution of the State of Utah	January 4, 1896	20,700	
1st	Constitution of the State of Vermont	July 9, 1793	8,565	(Note: Excludes the two constitutions of the Vermont Republic.)
7th	Constitution of the Commonwealth of Virginia	July 1, 1971	22,570	
1st	Constitution of the State of Washington	November 11, 1889	32,578	
2nd	Constitution of the State of West Virginia	August 22, 1872	33,324	
1st	Constitution of the State of Wisconsin	May 29, 1848	15,102	
1st	Constitution of the State of Wyoming	July 10, 1890	26,349	

=== Federal district charter ===
No.	Official name	Date of effect	Notes
1st	Charter of the District of Columbia	December 24, 1973	

The District of Columbia has a charter similar to charters of major cities, instead of having a constitution like the states and territories. The District of Columbia Home Rule Act establishes the Council of the District of Columbia, which governs the entire district and has certain devolved powers similar to those of major cities. Congress has full authority over the district and may amend the charter and any legislation enacted by the Council. Attempts at statehood for the District of Columbia have included the drafting of three constitutions in 1982, 1987, and 2016 all referring to the district as the "State of New Columbia".

=== Commonwealth and Territorial constitutions ===
- The Constitution of the Commonwealth of Puerto Rico, July 25, 1952. It was ratified by Puerto Rico's electorate in a referendum on March 3, 1952, approved by the United States Congress.
- The Constitution of the Commonwealth of the Northern Mariana Islands was drafted by thirty-nine elected delegates meeting in a constitutional convention on Saipan in 1976. Their proposed constitution was subsequently ratified by Northern Mariana Islands voters on March 6, 1977, and became effective January 9, 1978. Pursuant to the provisions of Section 202 of the Covenant, the Constitution of the Northern Mariana Islands was deemed to have been approved by the Government of the United States six months after the date of submission to the president. The six-month period having expired on October 22, 1977, President Carter issued a proclamation announcing the Constitution of the Northern Mariana Islands was deemed approved.
- The Constitution of the Territory of American Samoa was signed by 68 members of the 1960 constitutional convention and was approved by United States Secretary of the Interior Fred Andrew Seaton on 27 April 1960. It became effective 17 October 1960. Several amendments to the Constitution were approved in a referendum in the general elections in 1966, subsequently by Secretary of the Interior Stewart Udall on 2 June 1967, and became effective 1 July 1967.

=== Organic acts ===
- The Territory of Guam does not have its own constitution, but operates under the Guam Organic Act of 1950 and other federal statutes.
- The United States Virgin Islands, an unincorporated organized territory, does not have its own constitution, instead operating under various federal statutes. The Revised Organic Act of the Virgin Islands of 1954 is the current Organic Act defining the government of the United States Virgin Islands.

== See also ==
- Cost of Voting Index
- State constitution gubernatorial qualifications in the United States
- State constitutions in Australia
