= Constitution Hall (disambiguation) =

Constitution Hall may refer to:

- DAR Constitution Hall, a concert hall in Washington, D.C.
- Constitution Hall (Lecompton, Kansas), listed in the NRHP
- Constitution Hall (Topeka, Kansas)
- Constitution Hall (University of Alaska Fairbanks), listed in the NRHP
