= Constitution Hall (Lecompton, Kansas) =

- Lecompton Constitution Hall
- U.S. National Register of Historic Places
- U.S. National Historic Landmark
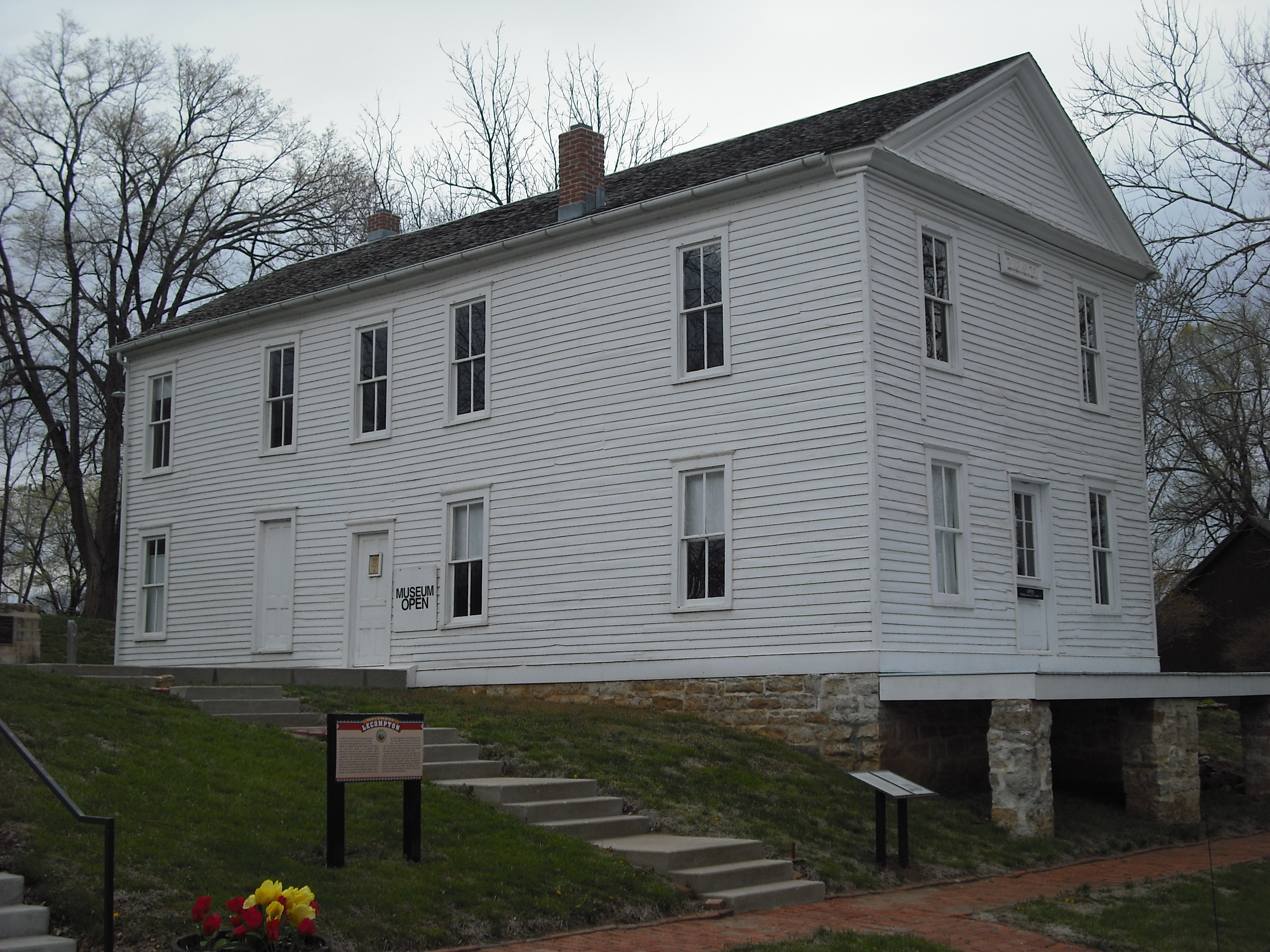
- Constitution Hall in Lecompton, Kansas

- Location within Kansas Location within the United States
- Location: Elmore St. between Woodson and 3rd Sts., Lecompton, Kansas
- Coordinates: 39°2′44″N 95°23′40″W
- Built: 1857
- NRHP reference No.: 71000312

Significant dates
- Added to NRHP: May 14, 1971
- Designated NHL: May 30, 1974

Lecompton Constitution Hall, also known as Constitution Hall, is a building in Lecompton, Kansas, that played an important role in the long-running Bleeding Kansas crisis over slavery in Kansas. It is operated by the Kansas Historical Society as Constitution Hall State Historic Site.

== History ==
Constitution Hall was constructed by Samuel J. Jones, the pro-slavery sheriff tasked with keeping the peace in Douglas County in the 1850s. He rented the structure out to the territorial government based out of Lecompton.

During 1857 this building was one of the busiest and most important in Kansas Territory. Thousands of settlers and speculators filed claims in the United States land office on the first floor. They sometimes fought hand-to-hand for their share of the rich lands that were opening for settlement. The government was removing the Native Americans from Kansas to make their lands available to whites.

Upstairs the district court periodically met to try to enforce the territorial laws. Most free-state people refused to obey these laws because they had been passed by the proslavery territorial legislature, which they called "bogus". This resistance made law enforcement nearly impossible for territorial officials. Time after time the territorial governors called out federal troops from Fort Leavenworth or Fort Riley to maintain order.

In January 1857 the second territorial legislative assembly met on the upper floor. Although still firmly proslavery, this group removed some of the earlier laws that their antislavery neighbors opposed.

The Lecompton Constitutional Convention met that fall in this same second-floor assembly room. The purpose of the convention was to draft a constitution to gain statehood for Kansas. Newspaper correspondents from across the country gathered to report on the meetings. Pro-slavery men dominated the convention, and created a document that protected slavery no matter how the people of the Kansas Territory voted. This was intolerable for their antislavery opponents, who refused to participate in what they considered to be an illegal government. Congress, after investigation, found the election of the pro-slavery legislature extensively corrupted by fraud, specifically by Missouri "border ruffians" who came into Kansas only to vote, not to live there. Congress therefore refused to admit Kansas as a slave state under the Lecompton Constitution, so it never went into effect.

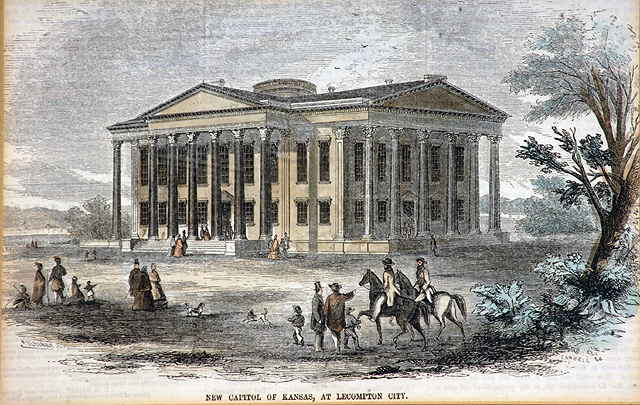
Planned Lecompton, Kansas, state capitol. Hand colored.

Instead, free-state forces rallied their supporters. They gained control of the territorial legislature in the October 1857 election. Two months later this new legislature was called into special session to deal with critical territorial problems. They met in the same Lecompton assembly hall that their political enemies had controlled only a few weeks before. Here they began to reform the laws of Kansas Territory according to their own beliefs. That work continued during later legislative sessions. In 1858 the assembly was moved from the proslavery capital of Lecompton to the free-state town of Lawrence; the capitol building under construction in Lecompton was abandoned, and the only completed part, the foundation, was used later by Lane University.

The Constitution Hall State Historic Site was listed in the National Register of Historic Places in 1971. It was declared a National Historic Landmark in 1974.

According to a marker of the Kansas Historical Commission:

LECOMPTON
SLAVERY CAPITAL

Three miles north is Lecompton, famous in the latter 1850's as headquarters of the Proslavery party in Kansas. The "bogus" legislature of 1855 made it the territorial capital and Congress appropriated $50,000 (~$1.33 million in 2024) for a capitol building that was never completed. Lecompton was served by stagecoach, steamboat and ferry. With a land office and other Federal agencies, it prospered until the downfall of the slave power in Kansas. Gov. Charles Robinson and many Free-State leaders were imprisoned there during 1856–1857. Still to be seen is the legislative hall in which the Lecompton Constitution was framed in 1857.

"Fort Titus", home of Pro-slavery leader Henry Titus, attacked and burned by Free-State men in 1856, was 2 1/2 miles north of this marker.

== See also ==
- Constitution Hall (Topeka, Kansas)
