= Kansas Conference =

Kansas Conference may refer to:

History

- Lecompton Constitution, second of four proposed constitutions for the state of Kansas

Sports

- Kansas Collegiate Athletic Conference, an intercollegiate athletic conference affiliated with the NAIA
- Kansas Jayhawk Community College Conference, a college athletic conference that is a member of the National Junior College Athletic Association
- Big Seven Conference (Kansas), a high school athletics league in Kansas
