= Constitutions of Kansas =

Under U.S. law, a state requires a constitution. A main order of business for Territorial Kansas was the creation of a constitution, under which Kansas would become a state. Whether it would be a slave state or a free state, allowing or prohibiting slavery, was a national issue, because it would affect voting in the polarized U.S. Senate. Because of tensions over slavery, four quite different constitutions of Kansas were drafted.

== Topeka Constitution ==
Text of the Topeka Constitution

The Topeka Constitutional Convention met in opposition to the first territorial legislature, from which free-staters had been excluded, and that they called "bogus". It adopted the Topeka Constitution on December 15, 1855, which was approved territory-wide on January 15, 1856. Under this constitution, free Blacks as well as the enslaved were excluded from Kansas; the "Black exclusion" was voted on separately, but it passed. The constitution was sent to Congress and approved by the House on July 2, 1856, but, opposed by President Pierce, failed in the Senate by two (Southern) votes.

== Lecompton Constitution ==
Text of the Lecompton Constitution

The Territorial Legislature met in Lecompton in September 1856 to prepare a rival document. The Lecompton Constitution explicitly allowed slavery, the subject of an entire article (Article 7). It was approved in a rigged election in December 1857, but it was overwhelmingly defeated in a second vote in January 1858 by a majority of voters in the Kansas Territory.

It was sent to Washington anyway. President Buchanan endorsed it, and it was approved by the Southern-dominated Senate, but the House sent it back to Kansas for a vote. It was overwhelmingly defeated a second time on August 2, 1858.

== Leavenworth Constitution ==
Text of the Leavenworth Constitution

In the 1856 election the free-staters achieved a majority in the legislature, and they called for another constitutional convention, to head off approval of the Lecompton Constitution. It met in March 1858 first in Minneola, then in Leavenworth. This constitution, the most liberal of the four—it would have given "all males" the right to vote—was sent to Congress in January 1859, but Congress took no action.

== Wyandotte Constitution ==
Text of Wyandotte Constitution

The convention met July 5, 1859 in the former community of Wyandotte, today part of Kansas City, Kansas. The Wyandotte Constitution was approved by territorial referendum on October 4, 1859. In April 1860, the United States House of Representatives voted to admit Kansas under the Wyandotte Constitution. The Senate was still just as opposed to a new free state, and no action was taken until January 1861, when senators from the seceding slave states abandoned their seats. On the same day the last of them left, Monday, January 21, 1861, the Senate passed the Kansas bill. Kansas's admission as a free state became effective Tuesday, January 29, 1861.

The Wyandotte Constitution remains Kansas's current constitution.

== See also ==
- Bleeding Kansas
- Constitution Hall (Lecompton, Kansas)
- Constitution Hall (Topeka, Kansas)
