= Wyandotte Constitution =

State constitution of Kansas, USA

The Wyandotte Constitution is the constitution of the U.S. state of Kansas. Amended many times (including a universal suffrage amendment in 1912), the Wyandotte Constitution is still the constitution of Kansas.

== Background ==
The Kansas Territory was created in 1854. The largest issue by far in territorial Kansas was whether slavery was to be permitted or prohibited; aside from the moral question, which at the time was seen as a religious question, the admission of Kansas to the highly polarized Union would help either the pro- or anti-slavery faction in Congress. As a procedure for resolving the issue, Congress accepted the proposal of Senator Stephen A. Douglas, that the question be settled by popular sovereignty: the residents of the territory would decide the question by vote. This did not work, because there was no accepted definition of who was a resident of the territory and could therefore vote. Hoping to make Kansas a slave state, thousands of "Border Ruffians" from the neighboring slave state of Missouri poured into Kansas, some with the intent to live in Kansas, but more planning to return to Missouri as soon as they had voted. The Massachusetts Anti-Slavery Society and similar groups sponsored free-state farmers who would move to Kansas. The most famous of these was John Brown, who told the free-state Kansans that violence was unfortunately necessary if Kansas were to be a free state. He put this into practice himself at the Pottawatomie massacre of 1856. As it was put later by his son John Brown, Jr., "only force and fire-arms kept slavery out of Kansas".

The upshot was that there were sizeable pro- and anti-slavery factions in Kansas, although the former were more numerous, if one accepted at face value their claim to be genuine Kansas residents. The result was dueling constitutions: for several years Kansas had two governments, in two different cities (Lecompton and Lawrence), with two constitutions, one pro- and one anti-slavery, each claiming to be the only legitimate government of the entire territory.

== Dueling constitutions ==
The convention drafting the Wyandotte Constitution was held between July 5, 1859 and on July 29, 1859, at Lipman Meyer's Hall just north of Kaw Point in the former community of Wyandotte (which is now part of Kansas City, Kansas, in Wyandotte County, Kansas).

However, there were also three other constitutions made for Kansans to vote on: the Topeka Constitution, the Leavenworth Constitution, and the Lecompton Constitution. After voting took place in a climate of intimidation and open violence, the Lecompton Constitution was voted to be the constitution of Kansas, and would have made Kansas a slave state. All that was left to do was send it to Washington D.C. After a rigorous national debate over the topic, it was overruled, and the people of Kansas were set to vote on the four constitutions again.

The Wyandotte Constitution was approved in a referendum by a vote of 10,421 to 5,530 on October 4, 1859. In April, 1860, the United States House of Representatives voted 134 to 73 to admit Kansas under the Wyandotte Constitution; however, there was resistance in the United States Senate. As 11 slave states seceded from the Union, their senators left their seats and, on January 21, 1861, the Senate passed the Kansas bill. The admission of Kansas as a free state became effective on January 29, 1861.

== Contents ==
The constitution settled the terms of Kansas' admission to the United States, particularly establishing that it would be a free state rather than a slave state. The constitution represented a pragmatic compromise over hotly contested issues: it rejected slavery and affirmed separate property rights for married women and their right to participate in school elections, but also denied universal suffrage for women, blacks, and Indians.

Solon O. Thacher of Lawrence gave a rousing speech opposing the exclusion of African-Americans from Kansas. The motion to exclude African-Americans was subsequently defeated, despite the fact that previously, "all the Democrats and a few of the Republicans favored the exclusion."

Another issue delegates considered was that of women's rights. Clarina Nichols, social activist and associated editor of Quindaro Chindowan, an abolitionist newspaper, was asked to address the convention. As a result of her efforts, women gained the rights to own property and to participate in school district elections. In addition, the constitution assured that the state would provide for women's equal rights "in the possession of their children."

The constitution dramatically reduced the size of the state, setting its western border at 102W longitude instead of the Rocky Mountains. The area between was part of Kansas Territory and at the time was the height of the Pike's Peak Gold Rush. The three earlier constitutions had set the western border as the Rockies. The land that was given up became part of Colorado Territory.

== Preamble ==
We, the people of Kansas, grateful to Almighty God for our civil and religious privileges, in order to insure the full enjoyment of our rights as American citizens, do ordain and establish the Constitution of the State of Kansas, with the following boundaries, to wit: Beginning at a point on the western boundary of the State of Missouri, where the thirty-seventh parallel of north latitude crosses the same; thence running west on said parallel to the twenty-fifth meridian of longitude west from Washington; thence north on said meridian to the fortieth parallel of north latitude; thence east on said parallel to the western boundary of the State of Missouri; thence south with the western boundary of said State to the place of beginning.

== See also ==
- Constitutions of Kansas

== Sources ==
- Kansas State Historical Society
- Wilder, D.W., "The Annals of Kansas". 1886.
- William G. Cutler, "History of the State of Kansas" 1883
- Greenpapers: Four Constitutions
