= Leavenworth Constitution =

1858 proposed state constitution for Kansas

The Leavenworth Constitution was one of four Kansas state constitutions proposed during the era of Bleeding Kansas. It was never adopted. The Leavenworth Constitution was drafted by a convention of Free-Staters, and was the most progressive of the four proposed constitutions. The conspicuous aspects of this Constitution were a Bill of Rights that referred to "all men" (making no distinction between the rights of white men and Black men), the banning of slavery from the state, and a basic framework for the rights of women.

The constitutional convention that framed the Leavenworth Constitution was provided for by an act of the Territorial Legislature passed in February 1858, during the pendency of the Lecompton Constitution in Congress. The constitution was adopted by the convention at Leavenworth April 3, 1858, and by the people at an election held May 18, 1858.

The Leavenworth Constitution did not have a great impact on the history of Kansas since the US Senate did not approve of the codified laws in the written document. The other proposed state constitutions were the Topeka Constitution (1855), the Lecompton Constitution (1857) and the Wyandotte Constitution (1859). The proposed Wyandotte Constitution became the constitution of Kansas when it was admitted to the union in 1861.

== See also ==
- Constitutions of Kansas
