= Minneola, Franklin County, Kansas =

Ghost town in Franklin County, Kansas

Minneola, Kansas
- Ghost town
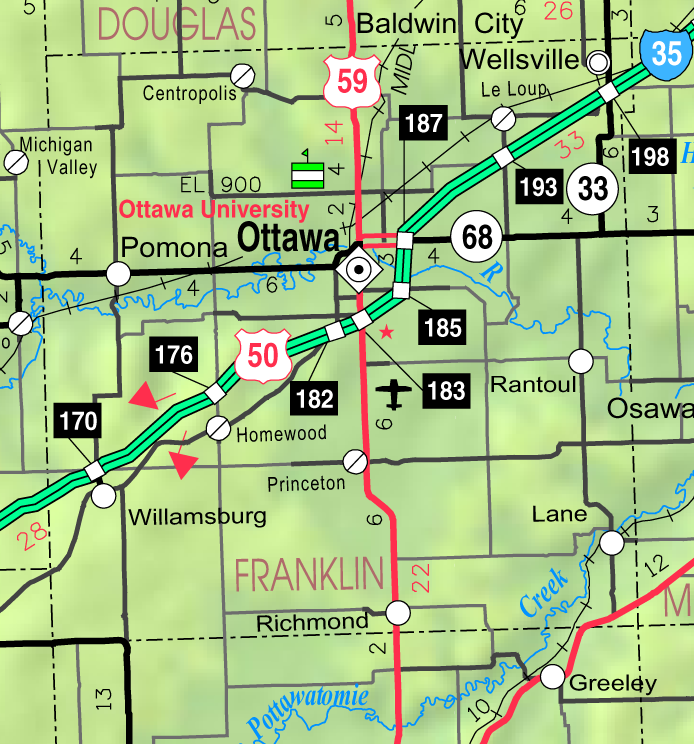
- KDOT map of Franklin County (legend)

- Location within Kansas Location within the United States
- Coordinates: 38°42′55″N 95°19′50″W
- Country: United States
- State: Kansas
- County: Franklin

Population
  - Total: 0
- Time zone: UTC-6 (CST)
  - Summer (DST): UTC-5 (CDT)

Minneola is a ghost town in Franklin County, Kansas, United States. Briefly in the running to be the territorial capital of Kansas, it was roughly one mile away from Centropolis. Today, hardly anything remains at the original site.

== Location ==
Minneola was located roughly one mile (1.6 km) east of Centropolis. Today, the site rests on both the north and south sides of Stafford Road, between Kentucky and Iowa Roads. The site is on private property, and in 1988 consisted of "little more than a few ruins and half a dozen farms."

== History ==
The ghost town can trace its origins to the earlier settlement of St. Bernard, founded in 1855. The town's postmaster, J. M. Bernard, was pro-slavery, and he angered many of the men in the area, who had anti-slavery leanings. Eventually, after Bernard was convinced to leave the settlement, St. Bernard developed into Minneola. At this time, Minneola became the chief rival of nearby Centropolis, as both were hoping to be the newly appointed territorial capital of Kansas. After Kansas free-state voters overcame the pro-slavery faction in 1857, the government voted against naming Centropolis as the capital of Kansas, since the town had pro-slavery leanings. However, the new free-state government still wished to move the territorial capital from Lecompton, and so the legislature convened at Lawrence to decide a new location. Perry Fuller—a man who had been successful in establishing Centropolis as a city—and several associates purchased 14 quarter sections of farm land near Minneola, hoping to expand the small town into the future capital. Around this time, Centropolis's newspaper, the Kansas Leader was brought into Minneola, and renamed to the Minneola Statesman.

Bribing the legislature with free town stock and land lots, Fuller was successfully able to get his town voted as the new capital on February 10, 1858. However, Kansas territorial governor James W. Denver vetoed this choice. Fuller appealed to Jeremiah S. Black, Attorney General of the United States, who ruled that the legislative bill had been a violation of U.S. statues, and was therefore invalid. Despite this, the legislature voted to meet at Minneola on March 22–3, 1858 to draft up a new constitution. Following this bill, work began on Minneola, and several buildings were constructed, including a potential governor's house, and a seven-story hotel. The city was also planned to be a hub for rail lines. However, once the legislature convened at the new town, they quickly moved to adjourn to Leavenworth. A later court ruling officially judged the legislative act establishing Minneola as the capital void.

The town—despite being bereft of its chance as a capital—still managed to be prosperous for a few years, largely due to the promise of coming railroads. It even briefly served as the county seat. However, after a destructive drought, the city was soon dismantled. Eventually, the Statesman was suspended and the proposed legislative hall was moved to Ottawa in 1864, where it served a variety of purposes until it was relocated for a second time and destroyed by fire. Other buildings were simply demolished. Today, hardly anything identifiable remains.
