= Lane University =

Defunct college in Kansas, United States

- U.S. National Register of Historic Places
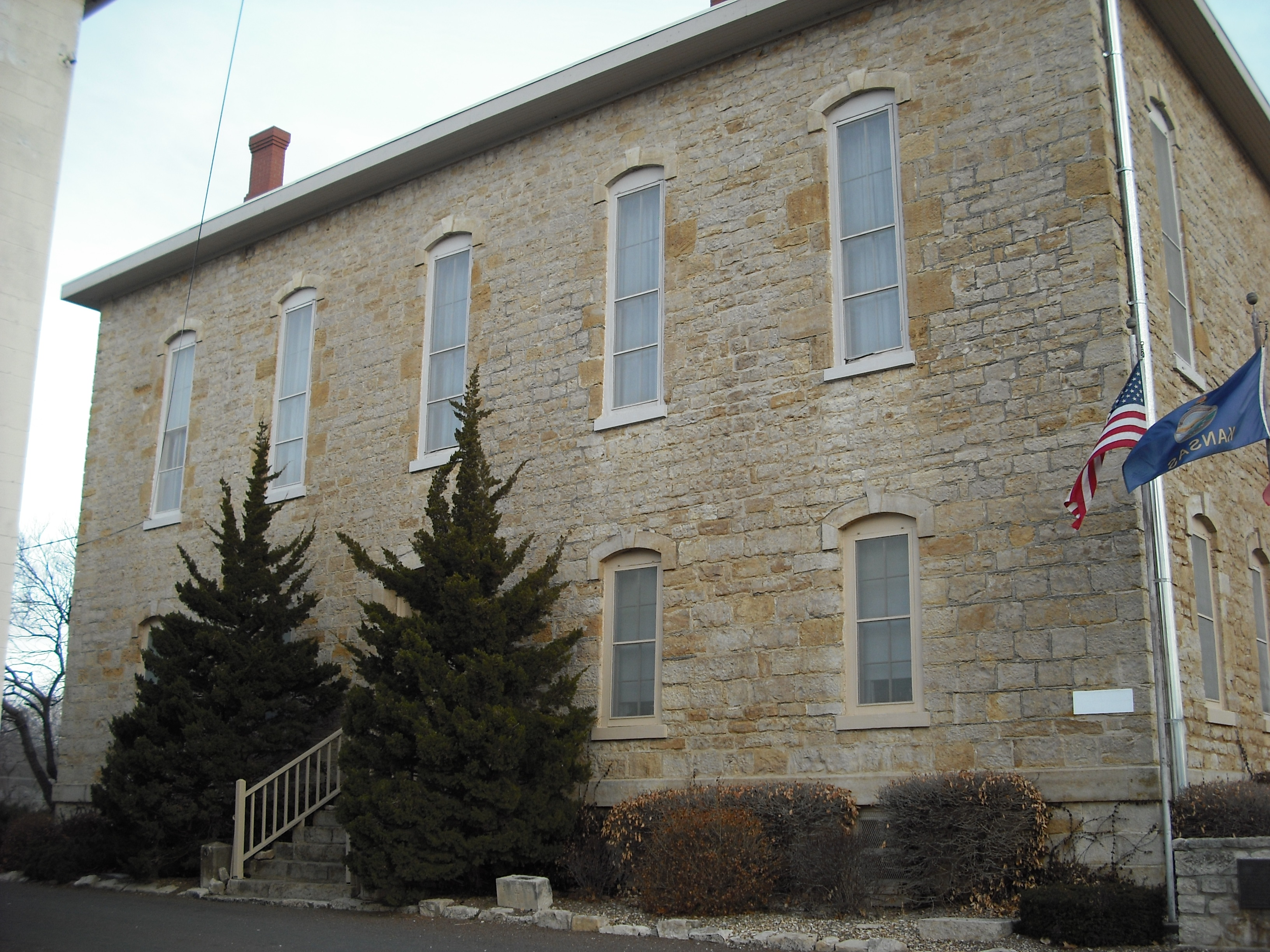
- Lane University & Territorial Capital Museum

- Location within Kansas Location within the United States
- Location: E side of Lecompton, Lecompton, Kansas
- Coordinates: 39°02′42″N 95°23′31″W
- Area: 1 acre (0.40 ha)
- Built: 1882
- NRHP reference No.: 71000313
- Added to NRHP: March 24, 1971

Lane University was a college located in Lecompton, Kansas, United States. It was founded in 1865 by Rev. Solomon Weaver, the first president, and was named after U.S. Senator James H. Lane. Jim Lane was a main free-state leader, and Lecompton was previously the capital of the opposing pro-slavery faction. Local tradition notes that a funding drive to construct the university promised to name it after the major contributor. Allegedly, James H. Lane made the largest pledge, received the namesake honor, and then died of a self-inflicted gunshot wound before he could carry out his promise.

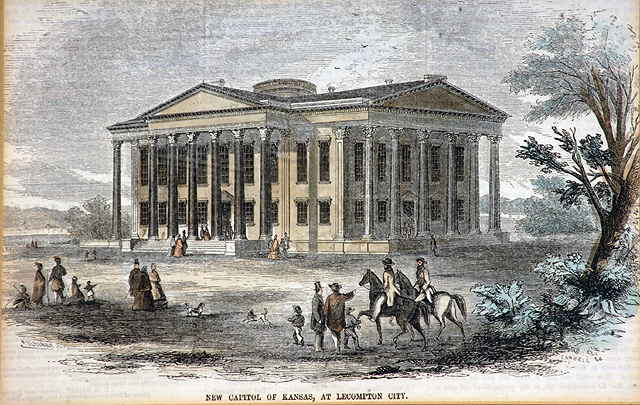
Never-completed Lecompton, Kansas, state capitol. Hand colored.

In 1865 The university was first located in what had been the Rowena Hotel. In 1865 the state donated to the university 13 acres of land that included the foundation of what had been intended to be the Kansas Territorial Capitol building at Lecompton. A college building was erected on the south half of the old foundation in 1882.

The Church of the United Brethren in Christ owned and controlled the school during its entire history. Almost all of the presidents were pastors. In 1900 it had 11 faculty members and 178 enrolled students. In 1902 Lane University was united with Campbell University to form Campbell College (Kansas). It closed in 1933.

David Eisenhower and Ida Stover, the parents of former president Dwight D. Eisenhower, met at Lane University as students and married in the chapel in 1885.

Today Lane University is a museum known as the Territorial Capital Museum, dedicated to Kansas history before the Civil War. It is listed on the National Register of Historic Places.

Lane University is not to be confused with Lane College in Jackson, Tennessee.
