= Constitution Hall (Topeka, Kansas) =

Historic building in Topeka, Kansas

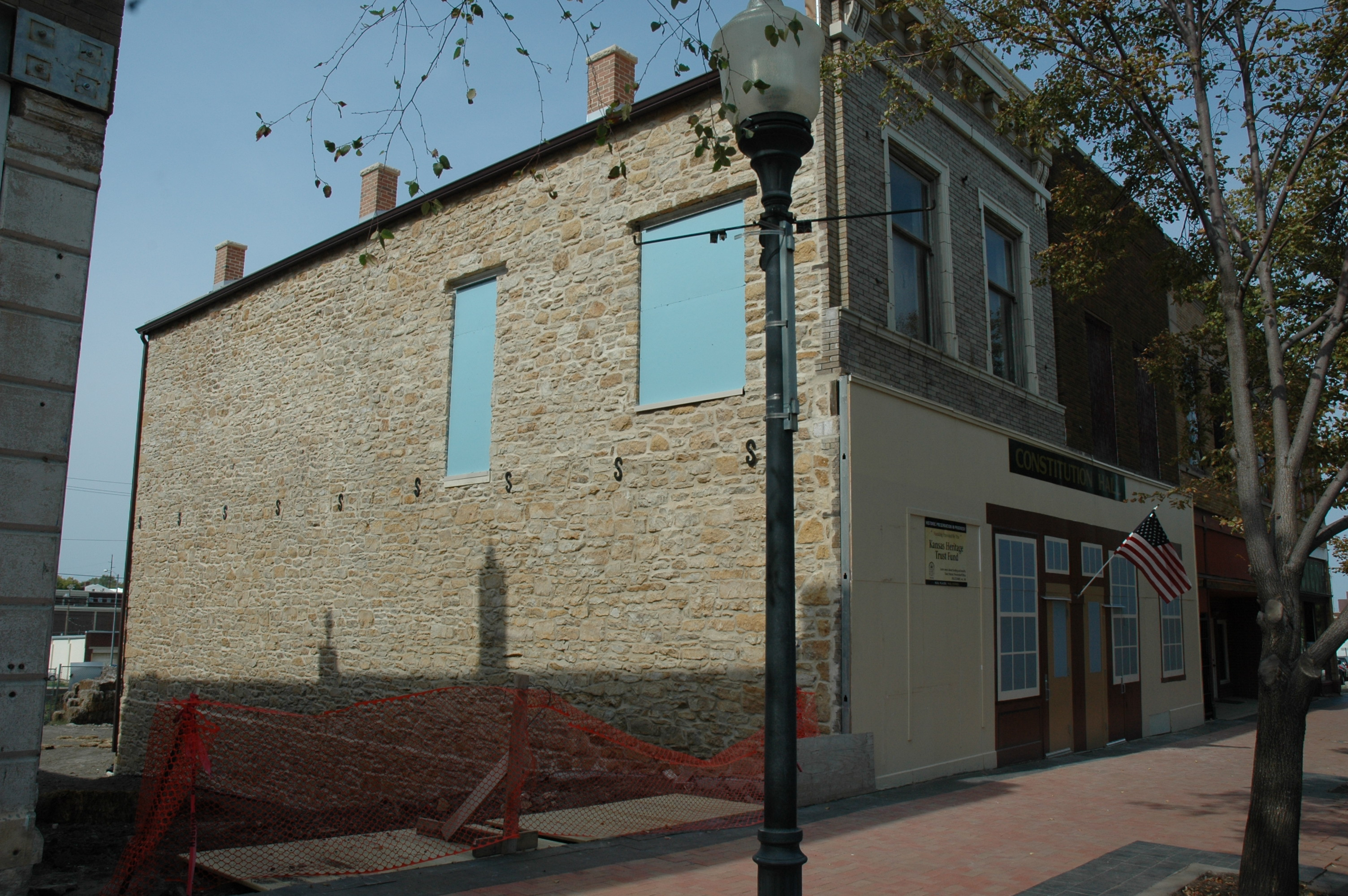
Constitution Hall in 2012.

Constitution Hall, in Topeka, Kansas, is a significant building in the history of Kansas Territory and the state of Kansas. The two-story native stone building, with basement, was begun by Loring and John Farnsworth in the spring of 1855. By summer, the Topeka Town Association had agreed to complete the building in exchange for holding the Topeka Constitutional Convention there in the fall. From October 23 to November 11, 1855, the Topeka Constitutional Convention met in the building and produced the antislavery Topeka Constitution.

The proposed Topeka Constitution would have brought Kansas into the Union as a free state. The United States House of Representatives approved this constitution in July 1856, but the Southern-dominated Senate refused to fully consider the document. Parts of the Topeka Constitution were incorporated in the Constitution of Kansas (the Wyandotte Constitution) drafted in 1859.

Constitution Hall became the Free State, Kansas Territorial-era capitol. The Topeka Legislature that occupied the building drew the wrath of Southerners in Congress. On July 4, 1856, President Franklin Pierce allowed federal troops led by Col. Edwin V. Sumner to disperse the Topeka Legislature.

The Free State Kansas Territorial government continued to meet at Constitution Hall, which basement was also used as a storehouse for supplies to sustain antislavery settlement during pro-slavery enforced trade embargo, and for Underground Railroad operations on the Jim Lane Trail.

== Capitol of Kansas, 1864-1869 ==
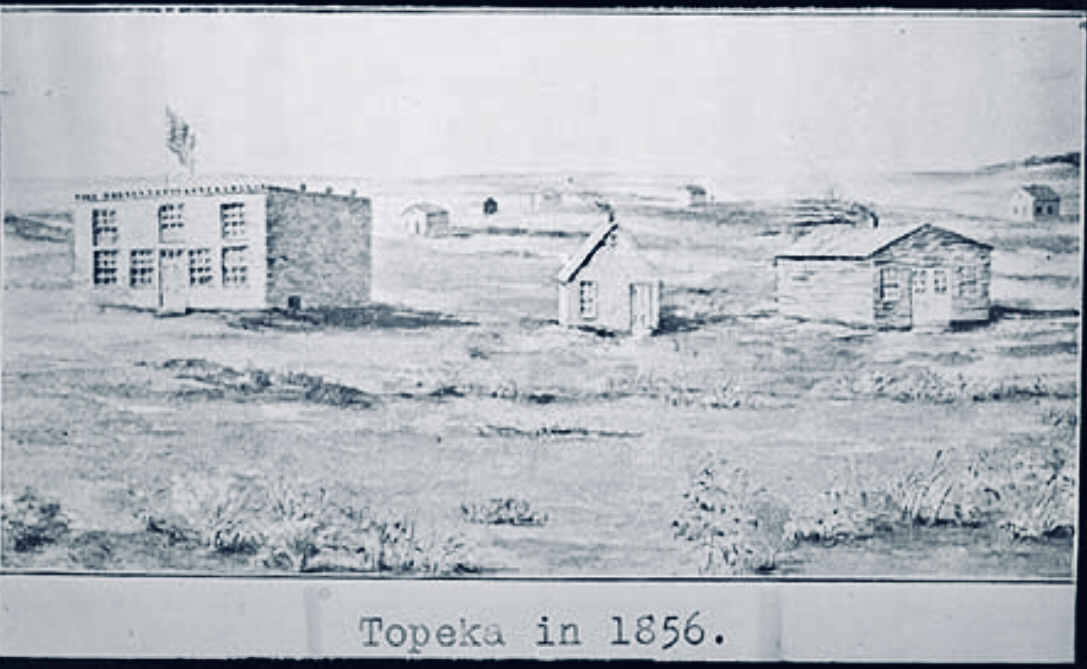
Topeka in 1856. Constitution Hall is on the left.

While a permanent state capitol building was being planned, Constitution Hall was used as a part of the temporary state capitol from 1864 to 1869. In an 1870s photo in the archives of the Kansas Historical Society, the temporary capitol is distinguishable from other nearby structures.

== Commercial uses, 1869-1997 ==
After the state government moved into the new East Wing of the present Capitol, on December 25, 1869, Constitution Hall held commercial uses and later, residential apartments on the second floor.

On July 4, 1903, the Topeka Chapter of the Daughters of the American Revolution (DAR) placed a commemorative plaque in the sidewalk, at 427-429 S. Kansas Avenue, to mark the location of Constitution Hall. In 1976, the Topeka Chapter relocated the plaque to the façade of Constitution Hall.

== Official recognition ==
In 2001, the National Park Service listed Constitution Hall in the National Underground Railroad Network to Freedom Program. Independent formal investigation of the building, by architectural historian William Seale, PhD, which was funded by the National Park Service in 2003, led to the July 15, 2008 listing of Constitution Hall on the National Register of Historic Places.

Restoration efforts increased in 2011 and will continue as funding becomes available.
