= Topeka Constitution =

1855 proposed constitution of Kansas Territory

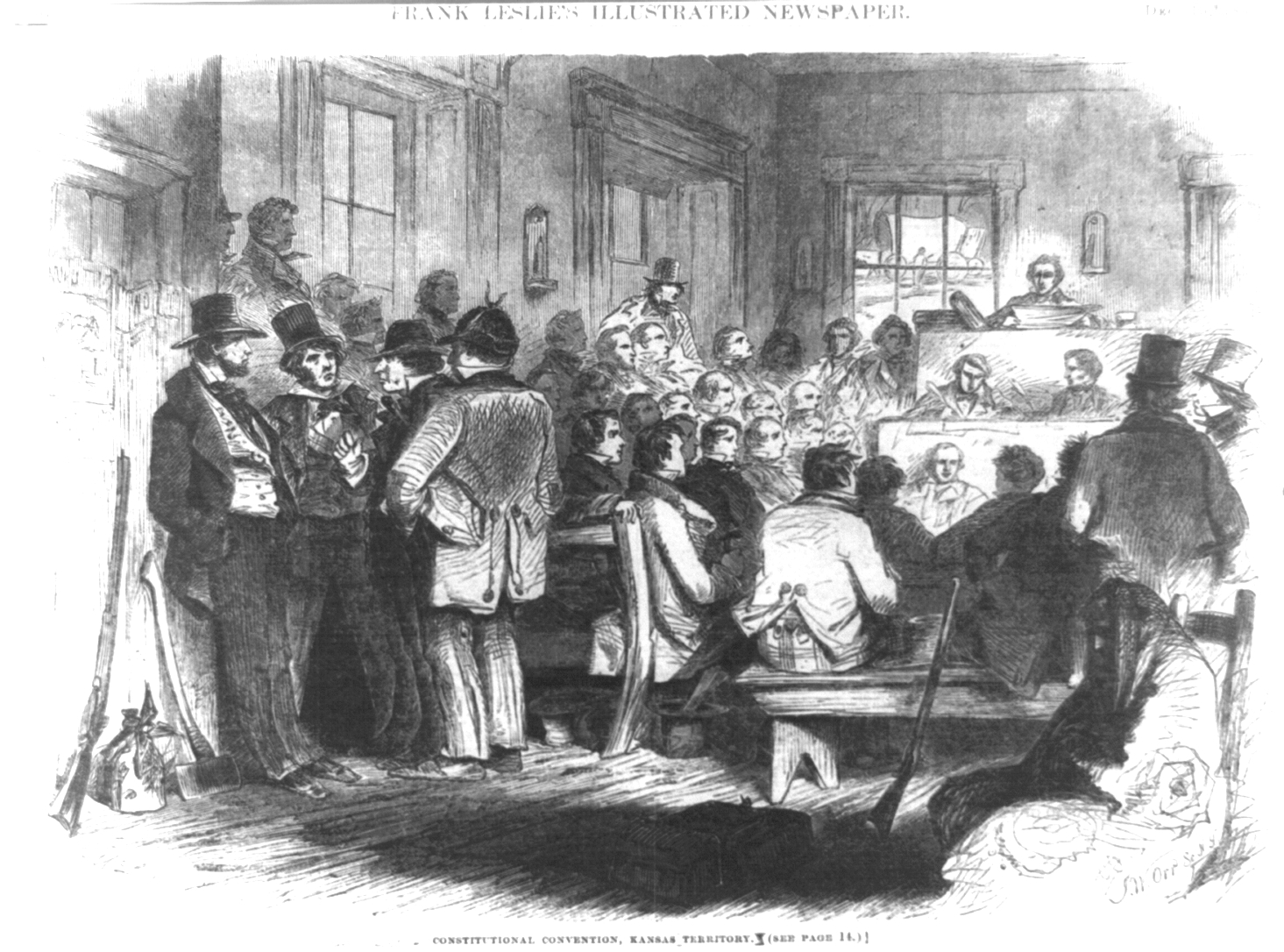
The Convention at Topeka, Frank Leslie's Illustrated Newspaper

The Topeka Constitutional Convention met from October 23 to November 11, 1855, in Topeka, Kansas Territory, in a building afterwards called Constitution Hall. It drafted the Topeka Constitution, which banned slavery in Kansas, though it would also have prevented free blacks from living in Kansas. The convention was organized by Free-Staters to counter the pro-slavery Territorial Legislature elected March 5, 1855, in polling tainted significantly by electoral fraud and the intimidation of Free State voters.

Flag raised over the Convention, 1855

The Topeka Constitution marked the first effort to form a Kansas governmental structure and define its basis in law. Free-State delegates passed the constitution on December 15, 1855. The Territorial election for officers and approval of the constitution on January 15, 1856, was boycotted by most pro-slavery men. Among those elected was Charles L. Robinson as governor. The constitution was forwarded to Washington with a plea to the U.S. Congress for admitting Kansas as a free state, under this constitution. President Pierce, anxious to placate Southerners and keep them in the Union, condemned the document. It was presented in the Senate by Senator Lewis Cass of Michigan and in the House by Representative Daniel of Indiana. It passed the House by two votes on July 2, but was held in committee by the Senate. On July 8, Senator Stephen A. Douglas took up the Topeka Constitution in a bill counter to Senator Cass, which threw the issue back upon the people of Kansas in accordance with the provisions of the Kansas-Nebraska Act.

Following the model of Oregon, citizens of the 2nd Territorial District petitioned the 1855 Free State convention to incorporate a "black exclusion" clause in the Topeka Constitution. This would have prevented not only the enslaved, but also free African Americans from residing in the state. It was rejected by convention president James H. Lane and others, who allowed the issue to be voted on separately in the January 1856 referendum; the results favored exclusion.

Yet the constitutional convention called by the radical free state element, meeting at Topeka in September, 1855, was in favor of excluding free Negroes from the new state. ... The free state party was anxious to clear itself of "the stale and ridiculous charge of Abolitionism." The Negro exclusion policy of the Topeka meeting was upheld, in a large majority, by the free state voters. "Three-fourths of the Free State settlers were in favor of a free white State," says Villard, "and the heaviest voting against the free Negro was" in Lawrence and Topeka.

With renewed determination, the Free State legislature reconvened in Constitution Hall on January 5, 1858. Governor Robinson urged keeping the State government intact, and laws were passed. The Topeka Constitution was again sent to the Congress, but no action was taken. The South controlled Congress, and it was not going to admit Kansas as a free state if it could help it. It was not so much that slavery was benign, as most of them believed, it was that a new free state would change the balance of power in the polarized Senate.

The Topeka Constitution was followed by the equally unsuccessful, pro-slavery Lecompton Constitution of 1857 and the Free-State Leavenworth Constitution of 1858. Finally the Wyandotte Constitution (1859) led to Kansas being admitted into the Union as a free state in 1861, five years after it first applied, the Southern legislators blocking it having departed en masse. The Civil War began four months later.

The conflict between the Free State legislature and the Territorial legislature, each seeking control of Kansas's destiny, was carried out with guns and the ballot box. These conditions and surrounding national implications inspired the term Bleeding Kansas. Following the Free State elections, in a lengthy address on January 24, 1856, President Franklin Pierce proclaimed the Topeka government to be illegitimate and ordered the arrest of its leaders: Despite this proclamation, the Topeka Legislature convened on March 4, 1856, and again on the Fourth of July to ask the Congress for admittance of the state. The legislature was dispersed on July 4, 1856, by three squadrons of federal troops under the command of Colonel Edwin Vose Sumner. Sumner later called this the most painful duty of his career. Never before had a body of U.S. citizens, meeting to exercise their right to vote, been broken up by federal forces.

== See also ==
- Constitution Hall (Topeka, Kansas)
- Constitutions of Kansas
