= Lecompton, Kansas =

- City
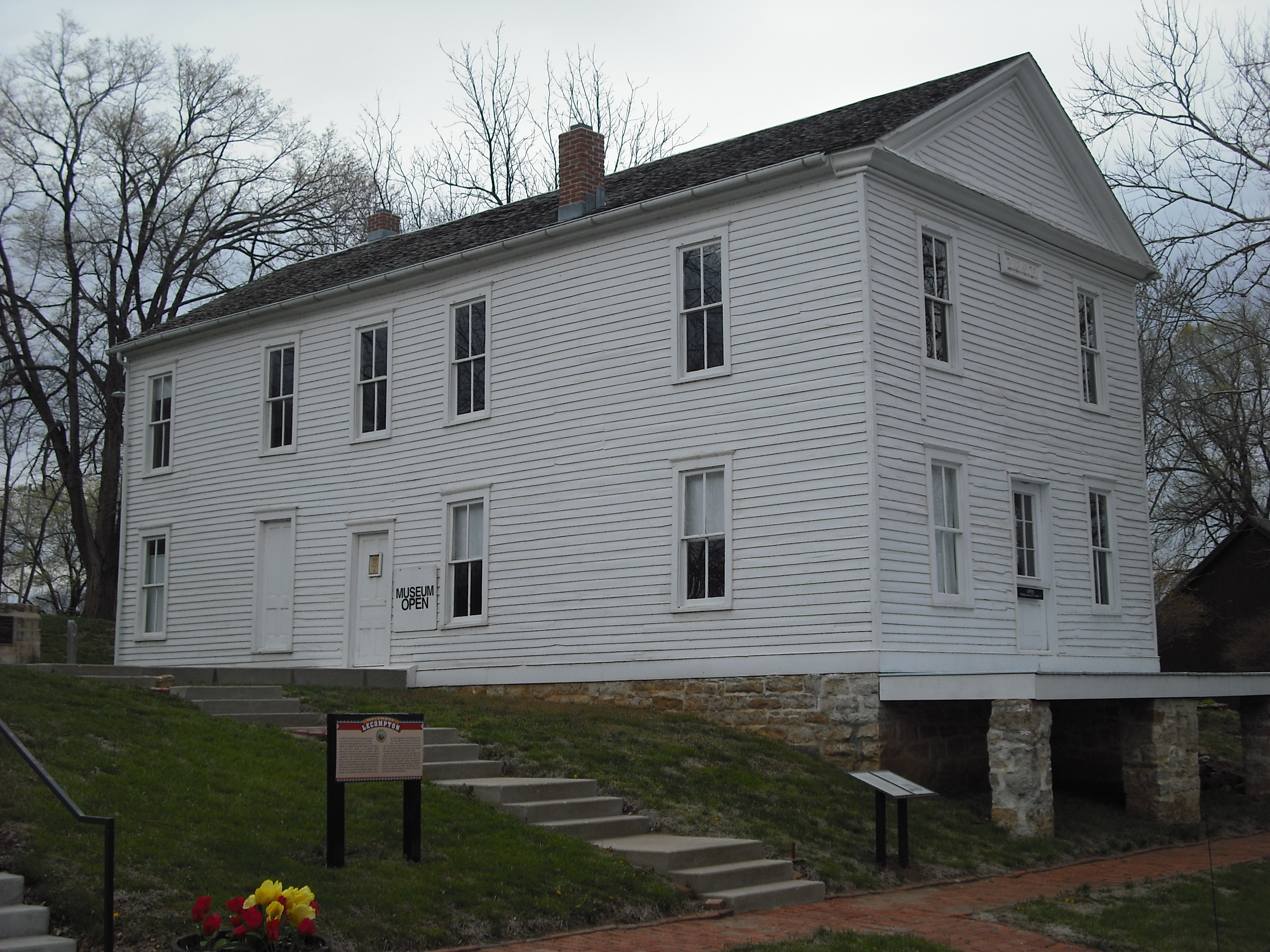
- 1857 Constitution Hall (2009)

- Flag

- Location within Douglas County and Kansas

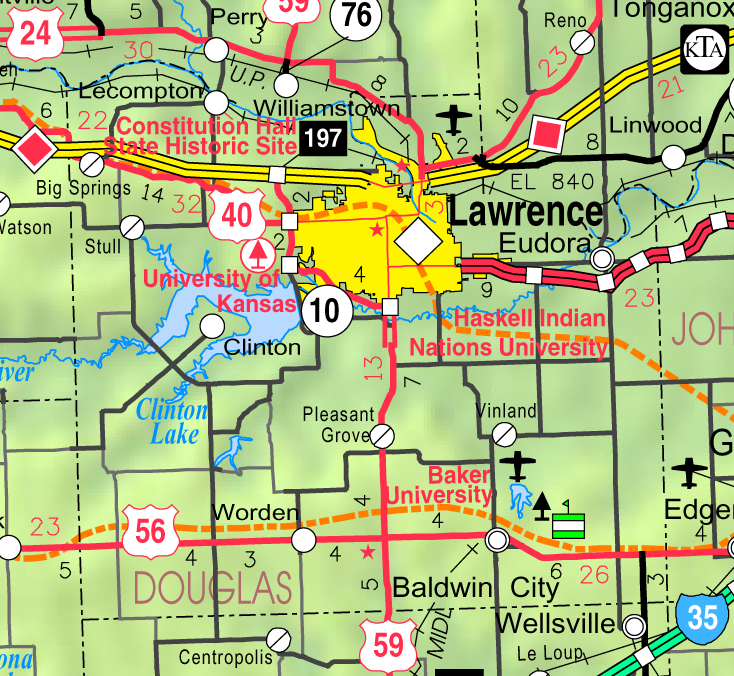
- KDOT map of Douglas County (legend) Lecompton, upper left.)
- Coordinates: 39°2′40″N 95°23′41″W
- Country: United States
- State: Kansas
- County: Douglas
- Township: Lecompton
- Founded: 1854
- Incorporated: 1855
- Named for: Samuel Dexter Lecompte

Area
  - Total: 1.76 sq mi (4.57 km^{2})
  - Land: 1.76 sq mi (4.55 km^{2})
  - Water: 0.0077 sq mi (0.02 km^{2})
- Elevation: 925 ft (282 m)

Population (2020)
  - Total: 588
  - Density: 335/sq mi (129/km^{2})
- Time zone: UTC-6 (CST)
  - Summer (DST): UTC-5 (CDT)
- ZIP Code: 66050
- Area code: 785
- FIPS code: 20-39150
- GNIS ID: 2395667
- Website: lecompton.org

Lecompton (pronounced /lɪˈkɒmptən/) is a city in Lecompton Township, Douglas County, Kansas, United States. As of the 2020 census, the population of the city was 588. Lecompton, located on the Kansas River, was the de jure territorial capital of Kansas from 1855 to 1861, and the Douglas County seat from 1855 to 1858. Anti-slavery Lawrence became the de facto capital during the latter part of this period, when the county seat was moved there. This time period was known as Bleeding Kansas, due to the violence perpetrated by opposing pro-slavery and anti-slavery factions in the eastern part of the state. Lecompton was a hotbed of pro-slavery sentiment during the mid-1800s.

== History ==
=== 19th century ===
Lecompton was founded in 1854, on a bluff on the south bank of the Kansas River. It was originally called Bald Eagle, and was renamed Lecompton in honor of Samuel Dexter Lecompte, the chief justice of the territorial Supreme Court. In August 1855, the city became the capital of the Kansas Territory after President Franklin Pierce appointed Andrew Horatio Reeder as governor and charged him and his officials with establishing government offices in Lecompton. The city soon became a stronghold of pro-slavery politics and Southern sympathy, which put it in conflict with nearby Lawrence, which had been founded by Free-Staters from Massachusetts.

The first post office in Lecompton was established in September 1855. The city served as the seat of Douglas County, until 1858, when it was moved to Lawrence.

In late 1857, a convention met in Constitution Hall and drafted the Lecompton Constitution, under which Kansas would have been a slave state. The constitution was rejected by Congress after intense national debate and was one of the prime topics of the Lincoln-Douglas debates. The controversy contributed to the growing dispute soon to erupt in civil war. The Lecompton Constitution failed, in part, because the antislavery party won control of the territorial legislature in the election of 1857. The new legislature met at Constitution Hall and immediately began to abolish the pro-slavery laws of what they called the Bogus Legislature, the territory's pro-slavery lawmakers since July 1855.

The free-staters briefly attempted to move the territorial capital to Minneola through a vote, although the resulting bill was later vetoed by Kansas territorial governor James W. Denver, and ruled void by U.S. Attorney General Jeremiah S. Black. As such, Lecompton remained the de jure territorial capital until the victorious free-state leaders officially chose Topeka as capital when Kansas became a state on January 29, 1861. The American Civil War began on April 12, 1861.

In 1865, the United Brethren Church established a university in Lecompton. Occupying the Rowena hotel that was originally built for the Territorial Legislature and visitors, the university later built a stone building in 1882 on the foundation of the started, but not completed, capitol building. Named "Lane University" after the free-stater James H. Lane, the university brought professors and students to community. It thrived until 1902, when Lane University moved to Holton, Kansas and merged to form Campbell College, which in turn merged with the now-defunct Kansas City University. The bell from Lane University went with the move, and today can be found on the campus of Holton High School. The Lane University building was then used for the high school in Lecompton until a larger brick building was built just to the south of it in 1926. The Lane University building fell into disrepair. In the 1970s, the community raised funds to rehabilitate the old building to become the Territorial Capital Museum, maintained by the Lecompton Historical Society. Two blocks away is Constitution Hall, where the infamous Lecompton Constitution was written in 1857. Constitution Hall is a museum operated by the Kansas Historical Society.

In the 1880s, there was some dissension in the United Brethren Church concerning secret organizations, causing the congregation to split. One group built another church on adjoining land which they named the Radical United Brethren Church. It burned about 1902 and a limestone church building replaced it. The former church was used as the Lecompton City Hall until about 2006, when a newer city hall was built in the old Lecompton Fire Station. The limestone church building is now a community building and a Douglas County sheriff's substation. In 2016, the Radical United Brethren Church was placed on the Kansas Register for Historic Places. With the building's addition to the historic register, Lecompton now has four buildings on either Kansas or national registers. The other three are Constitutional Hall, where two state constitutions were drafted in the 1850s in hopes of bringing Kansas into the union as a slave state; the Democratic Headquarters from the Bleeding Kansas era; and the Lane University building, which is now the Territorial Capital Museum.

When the frame business buildings on the east side of main street (Elmore) were destroyed by fire in 1916, they were replaced with brick structures. A mural depicting the city as it appeared before the fire is located in the local post office building.

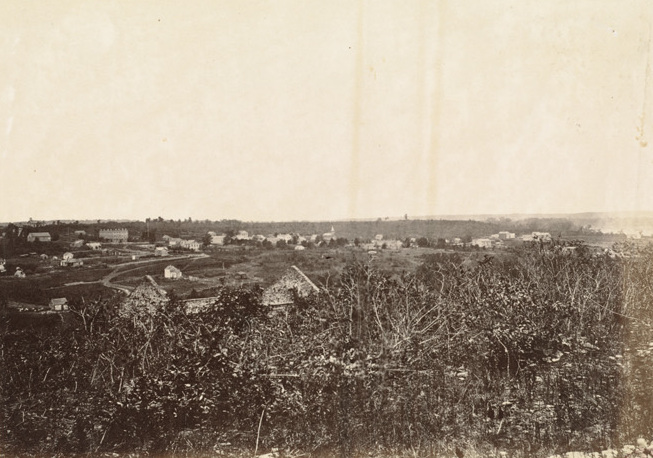
Lecompton in 1867

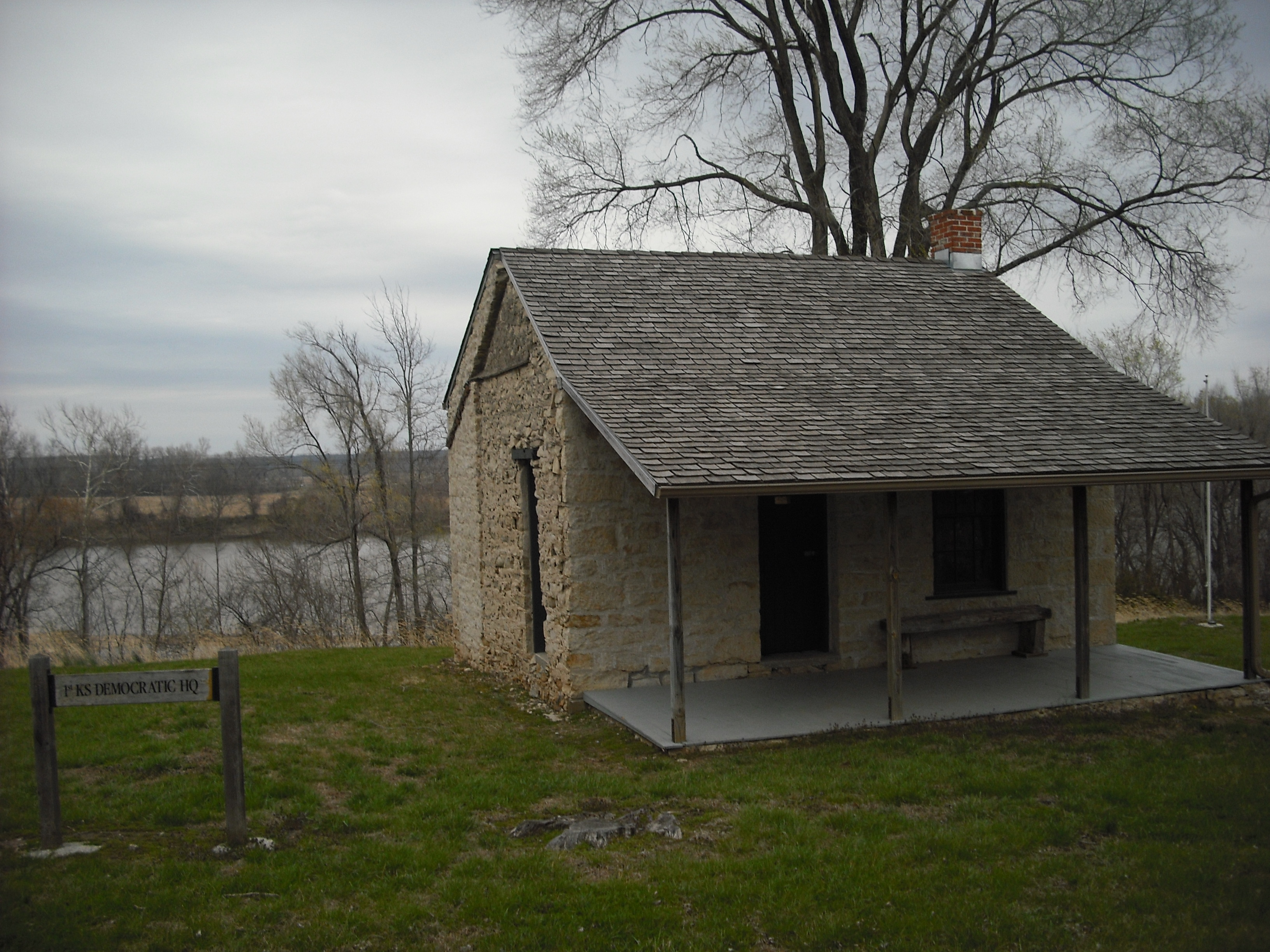
Former Kansas Democratic Headquarters

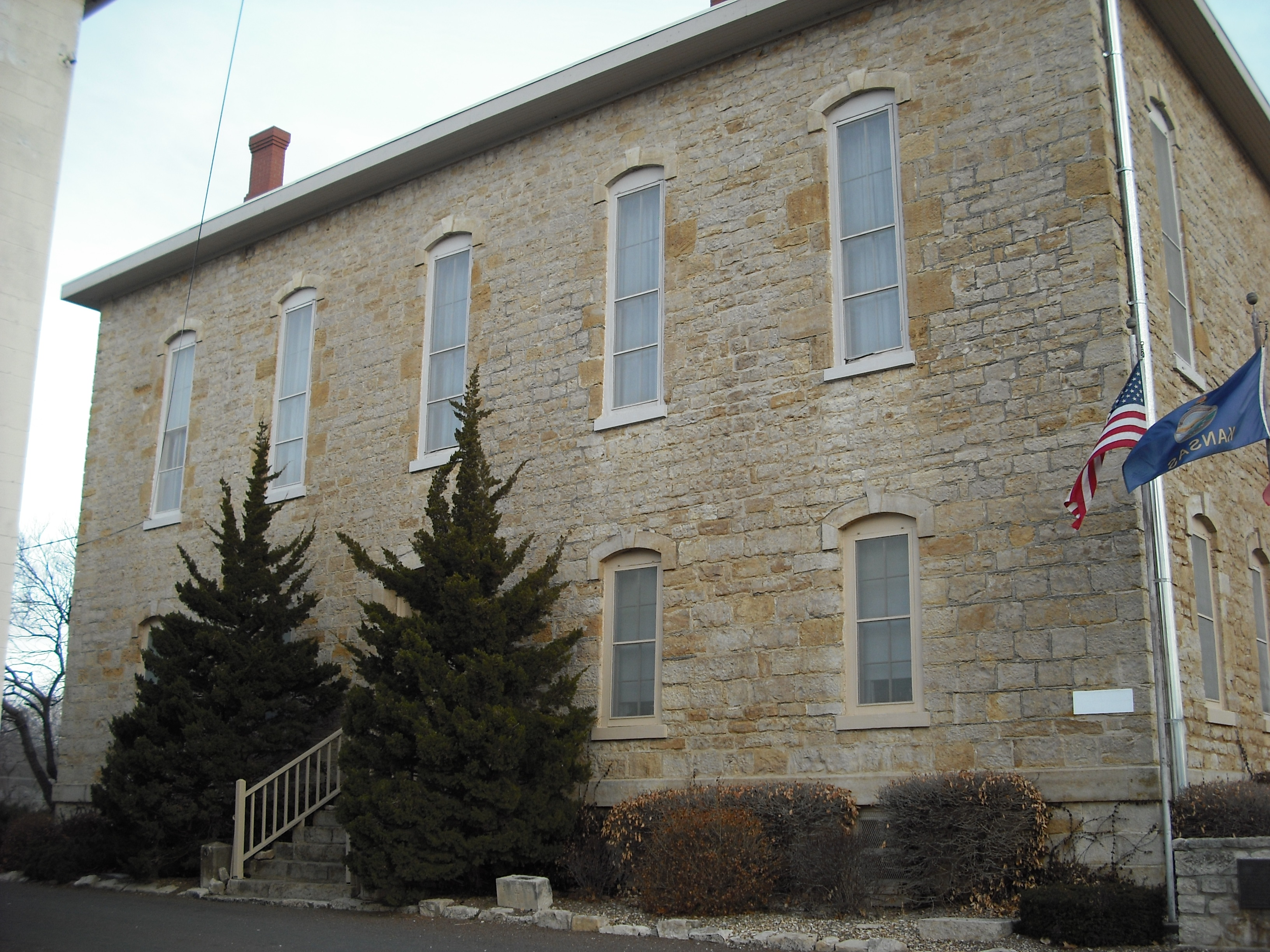
Former Lane University, now the Territorial Capital Museum

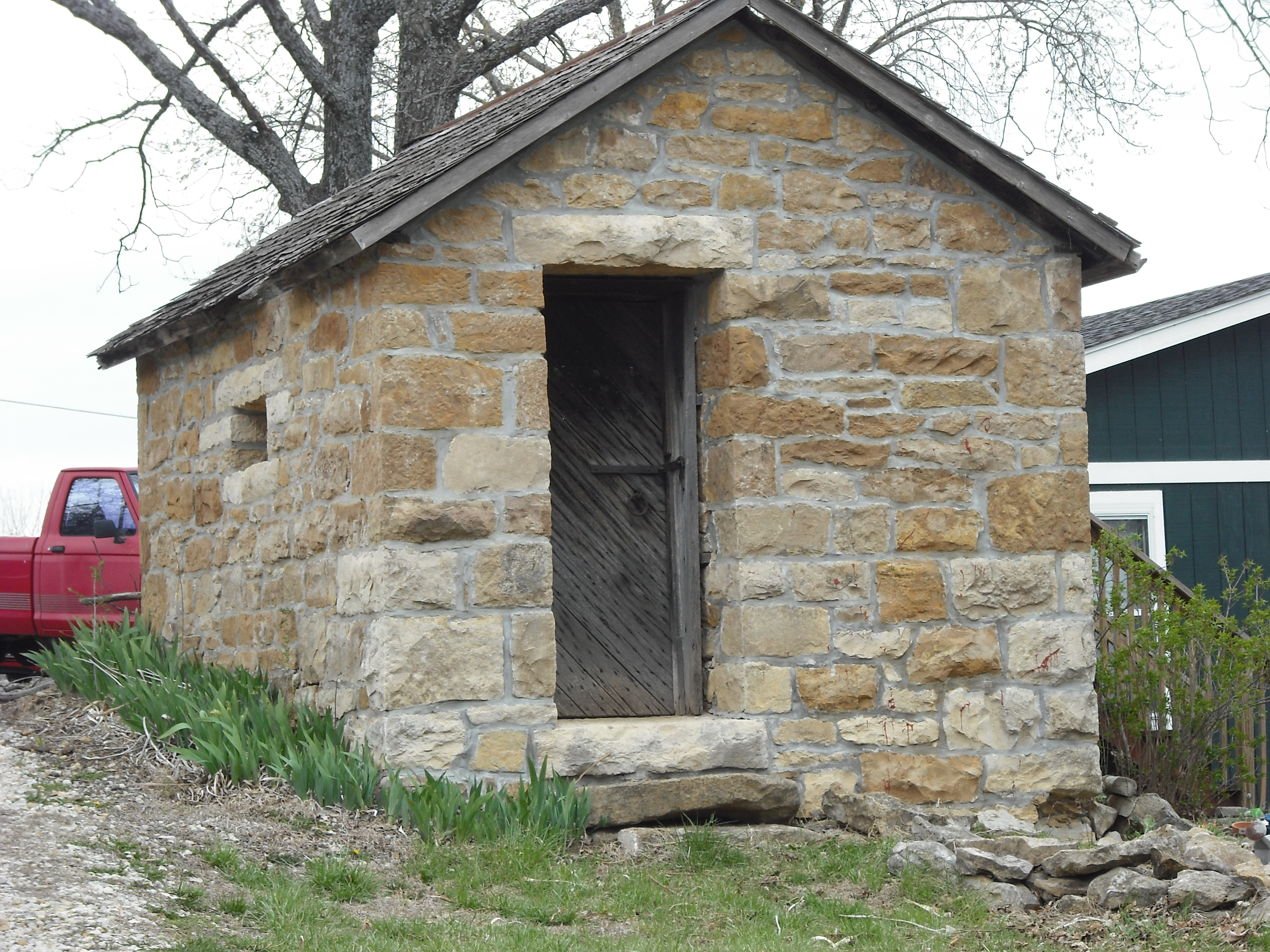
Former Lecompton City Jail

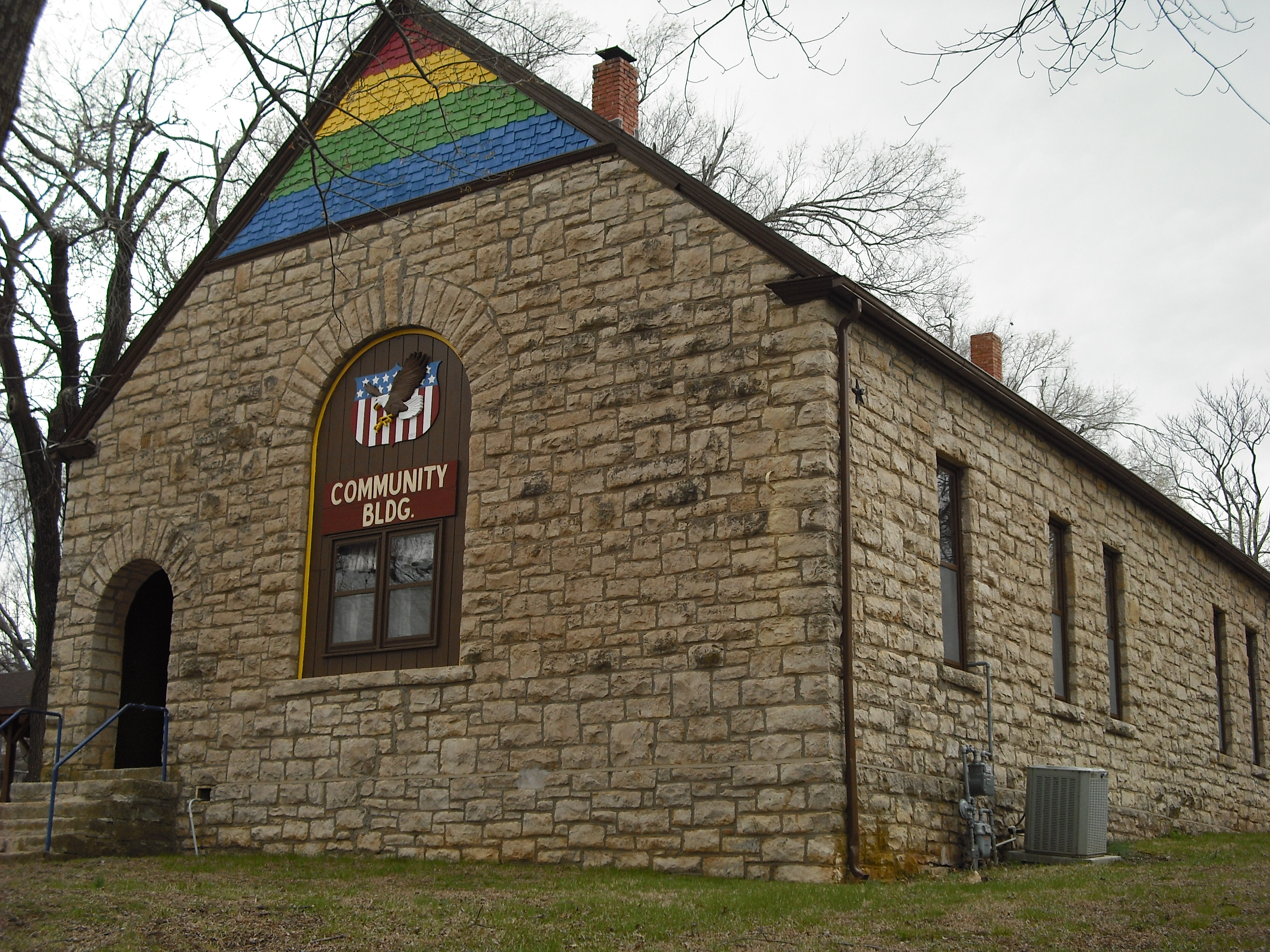
Radical United Brethren Church

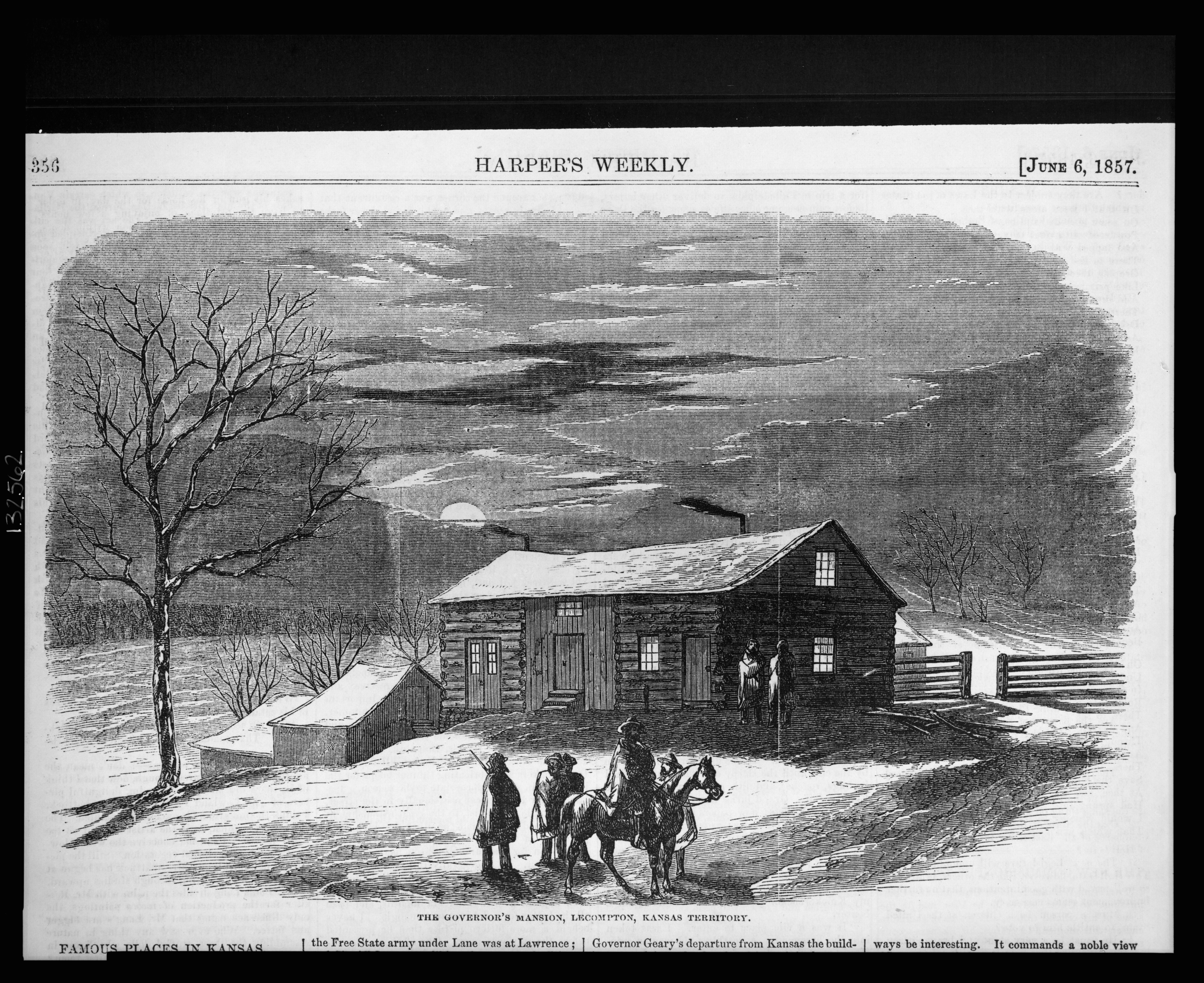
Governor's mansion in Lecompton in 1857

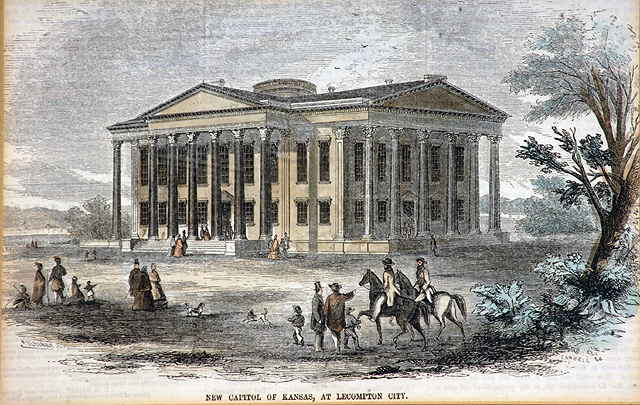
Drawing of planned state capitol in Lecompton

=== 20th century ===
In 1998, the Lecompton Historical Society began restoring the remains of the native limestone Democratic Headquarters Building c. 1850s. Originally there was a log cabin connected to the west side of this building located on East Second Street. The historic building was moved to Riverview Park, a public park along the south limestone bluff of the Kansas River, overlooking the Kaw Valley basin to the north.

=== 21st century ===
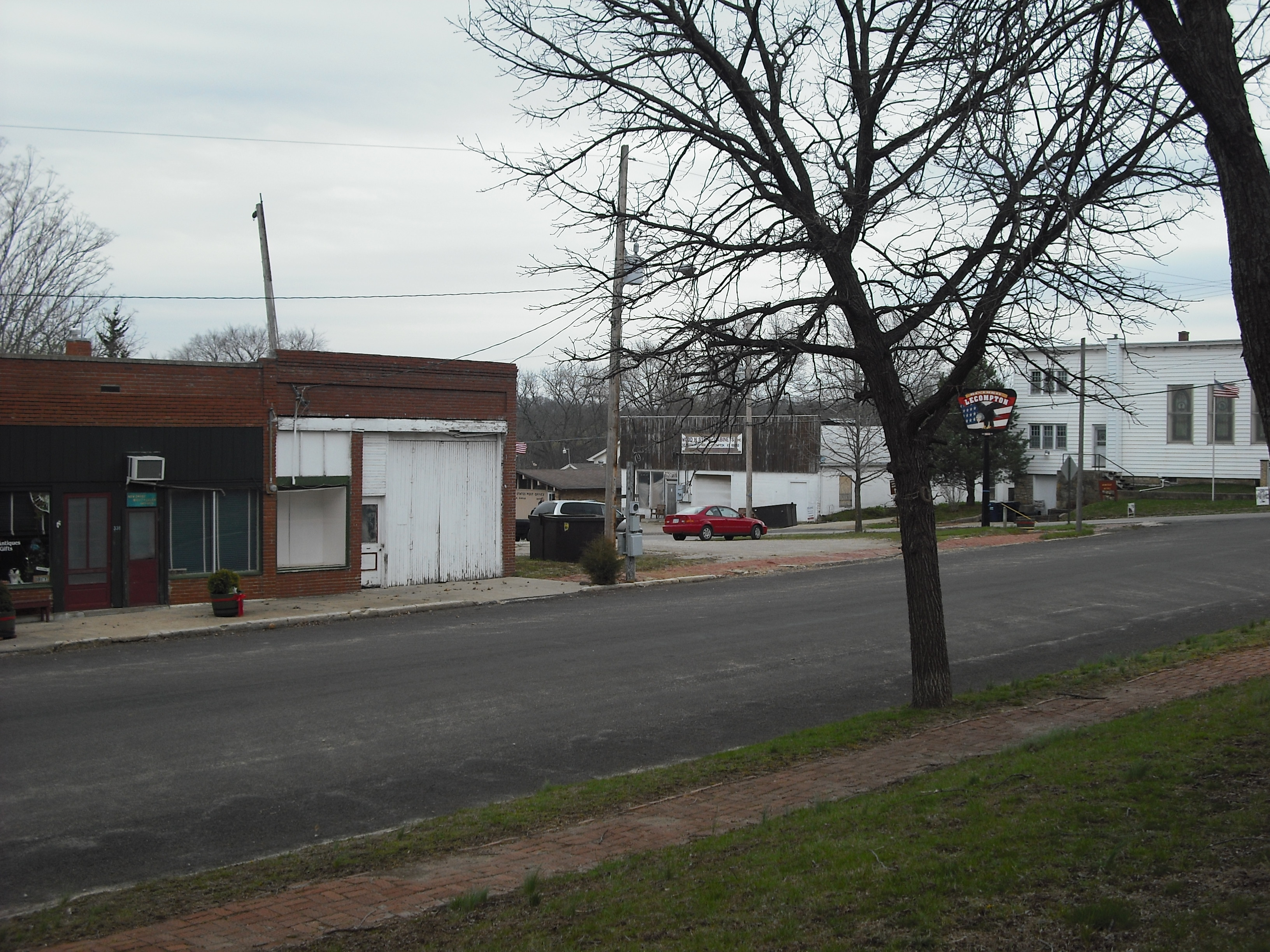
Downtown Lecompton

As of 2015, downtown Lecompton had an antique shop, cafe/diner, art shop, and an automobile restoration garage. A convenience store/meat market was located on the edge of the city. The City of Lecompton bought the old Lecompton High School from the local school district and began remodeling it into a community building.

== Geography ==
According to the United States Census Bureau, the city has a total area of 1.78 square miles (4.61 km^{2}), of which 1.77 square miles (4.58 km^{2}) is land and 0.01 square miles (0.03 km^{2}) is water.

The climate is characterized by hot, humid summers, and generally mild to cool winters. According to the Köppen Climate Classification system, Lecompton has a humid subtropical climate, abbreviated "Cfa" on climate maps.

== Demographics ==
Historical population
Census	Pop.	Note	%±
1880	284		—
1890	450		58.5%
1900	408		−9.3%
1910	386		−5.4%
1920	310		−19.7%
1930	288		−7.1%
1940	250		−13.2%
1950	263		5.2%
1960	304		15.6%
1970	434		42.8%
1980	576		32.7%
1990	619		7.5%
2000	608		−1.8%
2010	625		2.8%
2020	588		−5.9%
U.S. Decennial Census

Lecompton is part of the Lawrence, Kansas Metropolitan Statistical Area.

=== 2020 census ===
The 2020 United States census counted 588 people, 247 households, and 166 families in Lecompton. The population density was 334.9 per square mile (129.3/km^{2}). There were 265 housing units at an average density of 150.9 per square mile (58.3/km^{2}). The racial makeup was 86.39% (508) white or European American (85.88% non-Hispanic white), 1.19% (7) black or African-American, 2.38% (14) Native American or Alaska Native, 0.51% (3) Asian, 0.0% (0) Pacific Islander or Native Hawaiian, 2.04% (12) from other races, and 7.48% (44) from two or more races. Hispanic or Latino of any race was 2.72% (16) of the population.

Of the 247 households, 34.4% had children under the age of 18; 44.9% were married couples living together; 25.5% had a female householder with no spouse or partner present. 25.5% of households consisted of individuals and 11.3% had someone living alone who was 65 years of age or older. The average household size was 3.2 and the average family size was 3.5. The percent of those with a bachelor's degree or higher was estimated to be 13.9% of the population.

22.1% of the population was under the age of 18, 8.5% from 18 to 24, 23.8% from 25 to 44, 29.4% from 45 to 64, and 16.2% who were 65 years of age or older. The median age was 40.6 years. For every 100 females, there were 101.4 males. For every 100 females ages 18 and older, there were 103.6 males.

The 2016–2020 5-year American Community Survey estimates show that the median household income was $61,458 (with a margin of error of +/- $26,139) and the median family income was $75,250 (+/- $38,228). Males had a median income of $26,389 (+/- $19,491) versus $28,365 (+/- $5,820) for females. The median income for those above 16 years old was $27,981 (+/- $8,067). Approximately, 15.2% of families and 18.8% of the population were below the poverty line, including 33.1% of those under the age of 18 and 2.0% of those ages 65 or over.

=== 2010 census ===
As of the census of 2010, there were 625 people, 240 households, and 162 families residing in the city. The population density was 353.1 inhabitants per square mile (136.3/km^{2}). There were 254 housing units at an average density of 143.5 per square mile (55.4/km^{2}). The racial makeup of the city was 94.9% White, 0.5% African American, 2.2% Native American, 0.5% Asian, 0.3% from other races, and 1.6% from two or more races. Hispanic or Latino of any race were 1.4% of the population.

There were 240 households, of which 37.1% had children under the age of 18 living with them, 49.2% were married couples living together, 8.8% had a female householder with no husband present, 9.6% had a male householder with no wife present, and 32.5% were non-families. 22.5% of all households were made up of individuals, and 7.1% had someone living alone who was 65 years of age or older. The average household size was 2.60 and the average family size was 3.09.

The median age in the city was 36.7 years. 29% of residents were under the age of 18; 8.4% were between the ages of 18 and 24; 24% were from 25 to 44; 26.7% were from 45 to 64; and 11.8% were 65 years of age or older. The gender makeup of the city was 48.8% male and 51.2% female.

=== 2000 census ===
As of the census of 2000, there were 608 people, 228 households, and 168 families residing in the city. The population density was 677.9 inhabitants per square mile (261.7/km^{2}). There were 233 housing units at an average density of 259.8 per square mile (100.3/km^{2}). The racial makeup of the city was 93.59% White, 0.16% African American, 2.96% Native American, 0.66% Asian, 0.16% Pacific Islander, 0.16% from other races, and 2.30% from two or more races. Hispanic or Latino of any race were 2.30% of the population.

There were 228 households, out of which 41.2% had children under the age of 18 living with them, 54.8% were married couples living together, 11.4% had a female householder with no husband present, and 26.3% were non-families. 21.9% of all households were made up of individuals, and 6.6% had someone living alone who was 65 years of age or older. The average household size was 2.67 and the average family size was 3.06.

In the city, the population was spread out, with 31.6% under the age of 18, 8.2% from 18 to 24, 31.6% from 25 to 44, 17.8% from 45 to 64, and 10.9% who were 65 years of age or older. The median age was 33 years. For every 100 females, there were 93.0 males. For every 100 females age 18 and over, there were 93.5 males.

The median income for a household in the city was $38,281, and the median income for a family was $46,111. Males had a median income of $37,813 versus $20,577 for females. The per capita income for the city was $15,433. About 4.4% of families and 4.7% of the population were below the poverty line, including 3.4% of those under age 18 and none of those age 65 or over.

== Education ==
The community is served by Perry–Lecompton USD 343 public school district. School unification consolidated Perry and Lecompton schools forming USD 343 in 1970. Perry-Lecompton High School is located in Perry. Lecompton Elementary School is located in Lecompton. The Perry-Lecompton High School mascot is Perry-Lecompton Kaws.

Lecompton High School was closed through school unification in 1970. The Lecompton High School mascot was Lecompton Owls.

== Notable people ==
- William East - United States District Court judge
- Robert Stevens - former US Congressman
- Chuck Wright – Mayor of Topeka, Kansas, from 1965 to 1969

== See also ==
- Lecompton Constitution
- Origins of the American Civil War
- Great Flood of 1951
