= Lecompton Constitution =

1858 proposed state constitution for Kansas

The Lecompton Constitution (1858) was the second of four proposed state constitutions of Kansas. Named for the city of Lecompton, Kansas where it was drafted, it was strongly pro-slavery. It never went into effect.

== History ==
=== Purpose ===
The Lecompton Constitution was drafted by pro-slavery advocates and included provisions to protect slavery in the state and to exclude free people of color from its bill of rights. Slavery was the subject of Article 7, which protected the right to enslaved "property". It prevented the legislature from emancipating enslaved people without their enslavers' consent and full compensation. A rigged election approved it in December 1857 but overwhelmingly defeated in a second vote in January 1858 by a majority of voters in the Kansas Territory. The rejection of the Lecompton Constitution, and the subsequent admittance of Kansas to the Union as a free state, highlighted the irregular and fraudulent voting practices that had marked earlier efforts by bushwhackers and border ruffians to create a state constitution in Kansas that allowed slavery.

=== Predecessors ===
The Lecompton Constitution was preceded by the Topeka Constitution and was followed by the Leavenworth and Wyandotte Constitutions, with the Wyandotte becoming the Kansas state constitution. The document was written in response to the anti-slavery position of the 1855 Topeka Constitution of James H. Lane and other free-state advocates. The territorial legislature—which, because of widespread electoral fraud, mainly consisted of enslavers—met at the designated capital of Lecompton in September 1857 to produce a rival document. Free-state supporters, who comprised most actual settlers, boycotted the vote. President James Buchanan's appointee as territorial governor of Kansas, Robert J. Walker, although a strong defender of slavery, opposed the blatant injustice of the constitution and resigned rather than implement it. This new constitution enshrined slavery in the proposed state and protected the rights of enslavers. In addition, the constitution provided for a referendum on whether to allow more enslaved people to enter the territory.

The Topeka and Lecompton constitutions were placed before the people of the Kansas Territory for a vote, and supporters of the opposing faction boycotted both votes. In the case of Lecompton, however, the vote was boiled down to a single issue, expressed on the ballot as "Constitution with Slavery" v. "Constitution with no Slavery". But the "Constitution with no Slavery" clause would not have made Kansas a free state; it merely would have banned the future importation of enslaved people into Kansas (something deemed by many as unenforceable). Boycotted by free-soilers, the referendum suffered serious voting irregularities, with over half the 6,000 votes deemed fraudulent. Nevertheless, both it and the Topeka Constitution were sent to Washington for approval by Congress.

=== Rejection ===
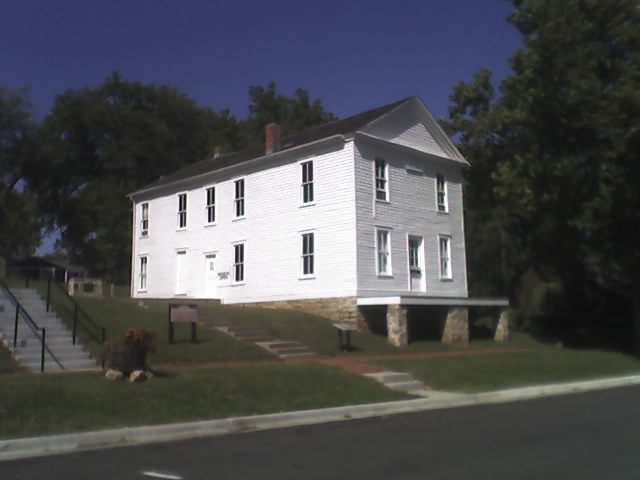
The Lecompton Constitution was drafted and signed in Constitution Hall in Lecompton, Kansas. Today it is a museum operated by the Kansas Historical Society.

A vocal supporter of enslaver rights, which he believed necessary to prevent Southern secession and preserve the Union, President James Buchanan endorsed the Lecompton Constitution before Congress. While the president received the support of Southern Democrats, many Northern Democrats, led by Stephen A. Douglas, sided with the Republicans in opposition to the constitution. Despite Douglas's objections, the Kansas statehood bill passed the Senate on March 23, 1858, by a vote of 33 to 25. Douglas was helped considerably by the work of Thomas Ewing Jr., a noted Kansas Free State politician and lawyer, who led a legislative investigation in Kansas to uncover the fraudulent voting ballots. A new referendum over the fate of the Lecompton Constitution was proposed, even though this would delay Kansas's admission to the Union. Furthermore, a new constitution—the anti-slavery Leavenworth Constitution—was already being drafted. On January 4, 1858, Kansas voters, having the opportunity to reject the constitution altogether in a referendum, overwhelmingly rejected the Lecompton Constitution by a vote of 10,226 to 138. In Washington, the admission of the state of Kansas with the Lecompton Constitution was rejected by the U.S. House of Representatives in 1858. Though soundly defeated, the debate over the proposed constitution had ripped apart the Democratic Party. Anson Burlingame delivered a fiery speech in the House of Representatives on March 31, 1858, condemning those in favor of the Lecompton Constitution as "An Appeal to Patriots Against Fraud and Disunion". Kansas was admitted to the Union as a free state in 1861, just as soon as the pro-slavery senators who had blocked it withdrew from the Senate because their states had seceded.

== See also ==
- Bleeding Kansas
- Constitutions of Kansas
