= Kansas Territory =

Territory of the United States between 1854 and 1861

Coordinates: 39.31°N 94.92°W

Territory of Kansas
- Organized incorporated territory of United States
- 1854–1861
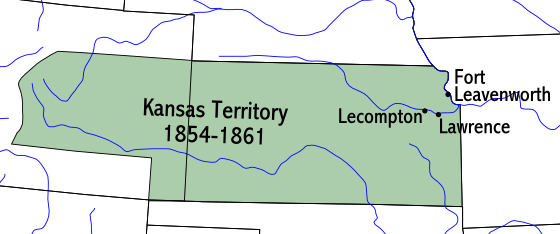
- Capital: Pawnee (provisional; July 2–6, 1855); Fort Leavenworth (provisional); Lecompton (1855–61); Lawrence (de facto, 1858–1861)
- Government
  - Type: Organized incorporated territory
- History
  - Kansas–Nebraska Act: May 30 1854
  - Statehood: January 29 1861
Preceded by	Succeeded by
Unorganized territory	Kansas; Colorado Territory

Historical population
Year	Pop.	±%
1860	107,206	—
Source: 1860;

The Territory of Kansas was an organized incorporated territory of the United States that existed from May 30, 1854, until January 29, 1861, when the eastern portion of the territory was admitted to the Union as the free state of Kansas. The territory extended from the Missouri border west to the summit of the Rocky Mountains and from the 37th parallel north to the 40th parallel north. Originally part of Missouri Territory, it was unorganized from 1821 to 1854. Much of the eastern region of what is now the State of Colorado was part of Kansas Territory. The Territory of Colorado was created to govern this western region of the former Kansas Territory on February 28, 1861.

The question of whether Kansas was to be a free or a slave state was, according to the Compromise of 1850 and the Kansas–Nebraska Act, to be decided by popular sovereignty, that is, by vote of the Kansans. The question of which Kansans were eligible to vote led to an armed-conflict period called Bleeding Kansas. Both pro-slavery and free-state partisans encouraged and sometimes financially supported emigration to Kansas, so as to influence the vote. During part of the territorial period there were two territorial legislatures, with two constitutions, meeting in two cities (one capital was burned by partisans of the other capital). Two applications for statehood, one free and one slave, were sent to the U.S. Congress. The departure of Southern legislators in January 1861 facilitated Kansas' entry as a free state, later the same month.

== Missouri Territory ==
From June 4, 1812, until August 10, 1821, the area that would become Kansas Territory 33 years later was part of the Missouri Territory. When Missouri was granted statehood in 1821 the area became unorganized territory and contained little to no permanent white settlement with the exception of Fort Leavenworth. The Fort was established in 1827 by Henry Leavenworth with the 3rd U.S. Infantry from St. Louis, Missouri; it is the first permanent European settlement in Kansas. The fort was established as the westernmost outpost of the American military to protect trade along the Santa Fe Trail from Native Americans. The trade came from the East, by land using the Boone's Lick Road, or by water via the Missouri River. This area, called the Boonslick, was located due east in west-central Missouri and was settled by Upland Southerners from Virginia, Kentucky, and Tennessee as early as 1812. Its slave-holding population would contrast with settlers from New England who would eventually arrive in the 1850s.

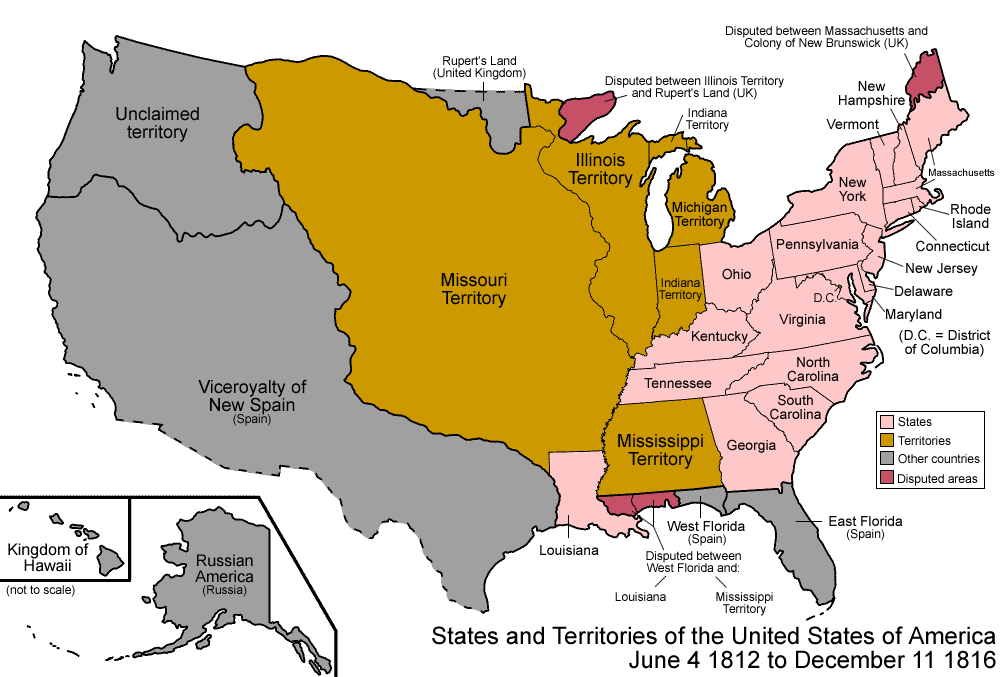
Map of the United States in 1812

The land that would become Kansas Territory was considered to be infertile by 19th century American pioneers. It was called the Great American Desert because it lacked trees and was drier and hotter than land eastward. Technically, it was part of the vast grasslands and prairies that make up the North American Great Plains and supported large herds of American bison. After the invention of the steel plow and more sophisticated irrigation methods, the thick prairie soil would be broken for agriculture. By the 1850s, immigration pressure was increasing; this prompted Congress to organize Kansas into a territory.

During the time that Kansas Territory existed, there was never any railroad built, although there were some lines just to the east across the Missouri River. Railroads would not be built until 1863, and the Missouri River wouldn't get a permanent crossing until the Hannibal Bridge was completed in 1869. During their existence, Kansas and Nebraska Territories served as a major part of the American frontier.

== Kansas–Nebraska Act ==
Kansas Territory was established on May 30, 1854, by the Kansas–Nebraska Act. This act established both the Nebraska Territory and Kansas Territory. The most momentous provision of the Act in effect repealed the Missouri Compromise of 1820 and allowed the settlers of Kansas Territory to determine by popular sovereignty whether Kansas would be a free state or a slave state.

The Act contained thirty-seven sections. The provisions relating to Kansas Territory were embodied in the last eighteen sections. Some of the more notable sections were:

Section 19

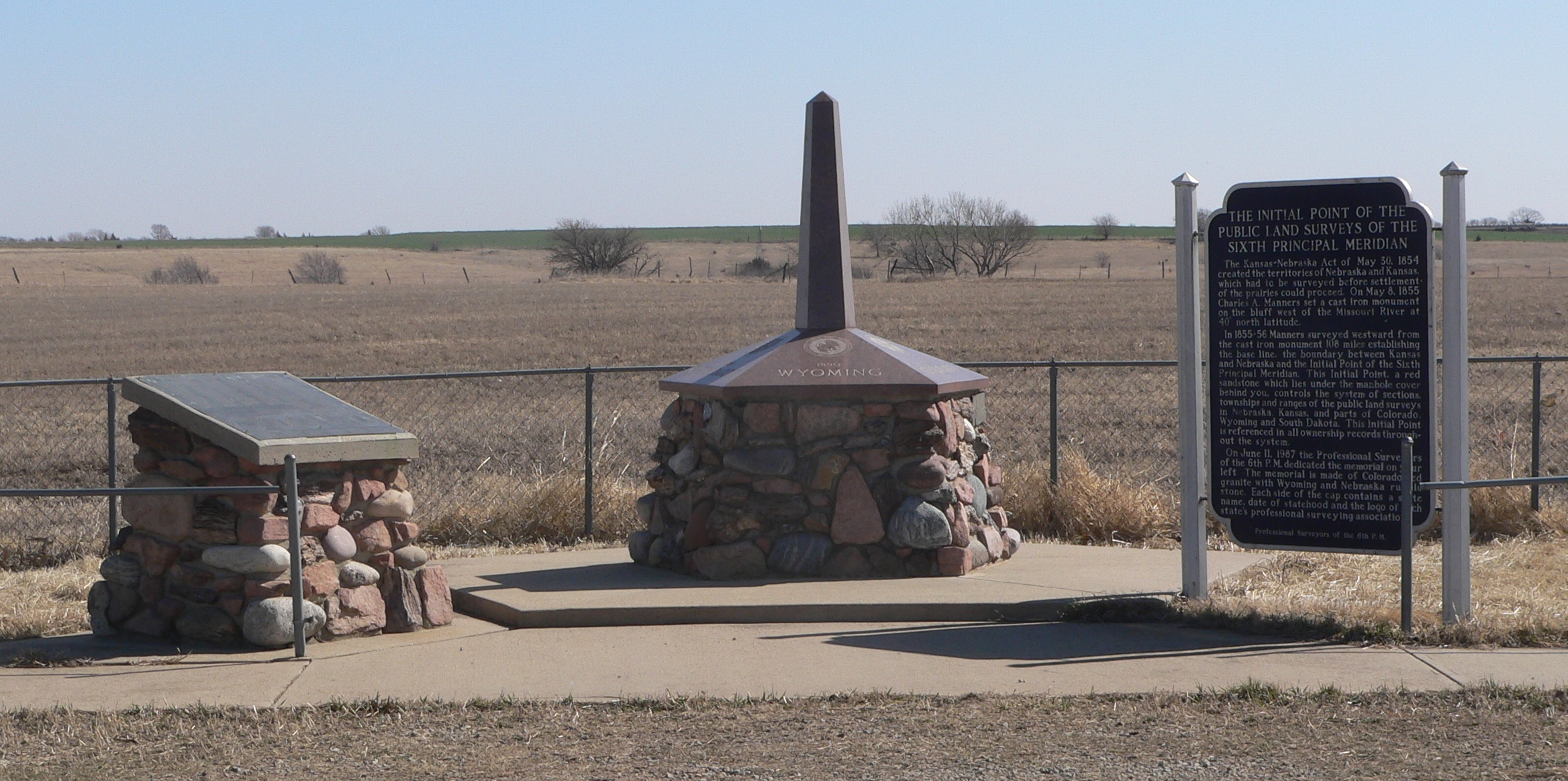
Site No. JF00-072: The Nebraska–Kansas state line at the intersection of Nebraska counties Thayer and Jefferson and Kansas counties Washington and Republic

Defines the boundaries of the Territory, gives it the name of Kansas, and prescribes that "when admitted as a State or States, the said Territory, or any portion of the same, shall be received into the Union with or without slavery, as their constitution may prescribe at the time of their admission." It further provides for its future division into two or more Territories, and the attaching of any portion thereof to any other State or Territory; and for the holding inviolable the rights of all Indian tribes until such time as they shall be extinguished by treaty.

Section 28
Declares the Fugitive Slave Law of 1850 to be in full force in the Territory.

Section 31
Locates the seat of government of the Territory, temporarily at Fort Leavenworth, and authorizes the use for public purposes of the government buildings.

Section 37
Declares all treaties, laws and other engagements made by the United States Government, with the Indian tribes inhabiting the Territory, to remain inviolate, notwithstanding anything contained in the provisions of this act.

== Indians in the territory ==
1836 map of Indian reservations west of Arkansas and Missouri

Several Indian tribes lived in the territory and the state once it was formed. Wild American bison herds roamed the area at the time, which was a source of food for the semi-nomadic tribes in the territory and the warlike tribes as well. The land was full of elk, deer, and pronghorn, as well. The Indians often hunted on the Plains in areas where no one had settled, but interactions between Indians and settlers increased as emigration continued. Reservations included:

- Kickapoos
- Delawares
- Kansas
- Shawnees
- Ottows
- Peorius and Kuskask
- Pankeskaws and Weaws
- Osages, by far the largest reservation in Kansas Territory
- Cherokees

== Eastern emigration ==
=== Pro-slavery settlers ===
Within a few days after the passage of the Kansas–Nebraska Act, hundreds of Missourians crossed into the adjacent territory, selected a section of land, and then united with fellow-adventurers in a meeting or meetings, intending to establish a pro-slavery preemption upon all this region.

As early as June 10, 1854, the Missourians held a meeting at Salt Creek Valley, a trading post 3 miles (5 km) west from Fort Leavenworth, at which a "Squatter's Claim Association" was organized. They said they were in favor of making Kansas a slave state if it should require half the citizens of Missouri, musket in hand, to emigrate there. According to these emigrants, abolitionists would do well not to stop in Kansas Territory, but keep on up the Missouri River until they reach Nebraska Territory, which was anticipated to be a free state. Before the first arrival of Free-State emigrants from the northern and eastern States, nearly every desirable location along the Missouri River had been claimed by men from western Missouri, by virtue of the preemption laws.

=== Free staters ===
During the long debate that preceded the passage of the Kansas-Nebraska Act, it had become the settled opinion at the North that the only remaining means whereby the territory might yet be rescued from the grasp of the slave power, was in its immediate occupancy and settlement by anti-slavery emigrants from the free states in sufficient numbers to establish free institutions within its borders. The desire to facilitate the colonization of the Territory took practical shape while the bill was still under debate in the United States Congress. The largest organization created for this purpose was the New England Emigrant Aid Company, organized by Eli Thayer.

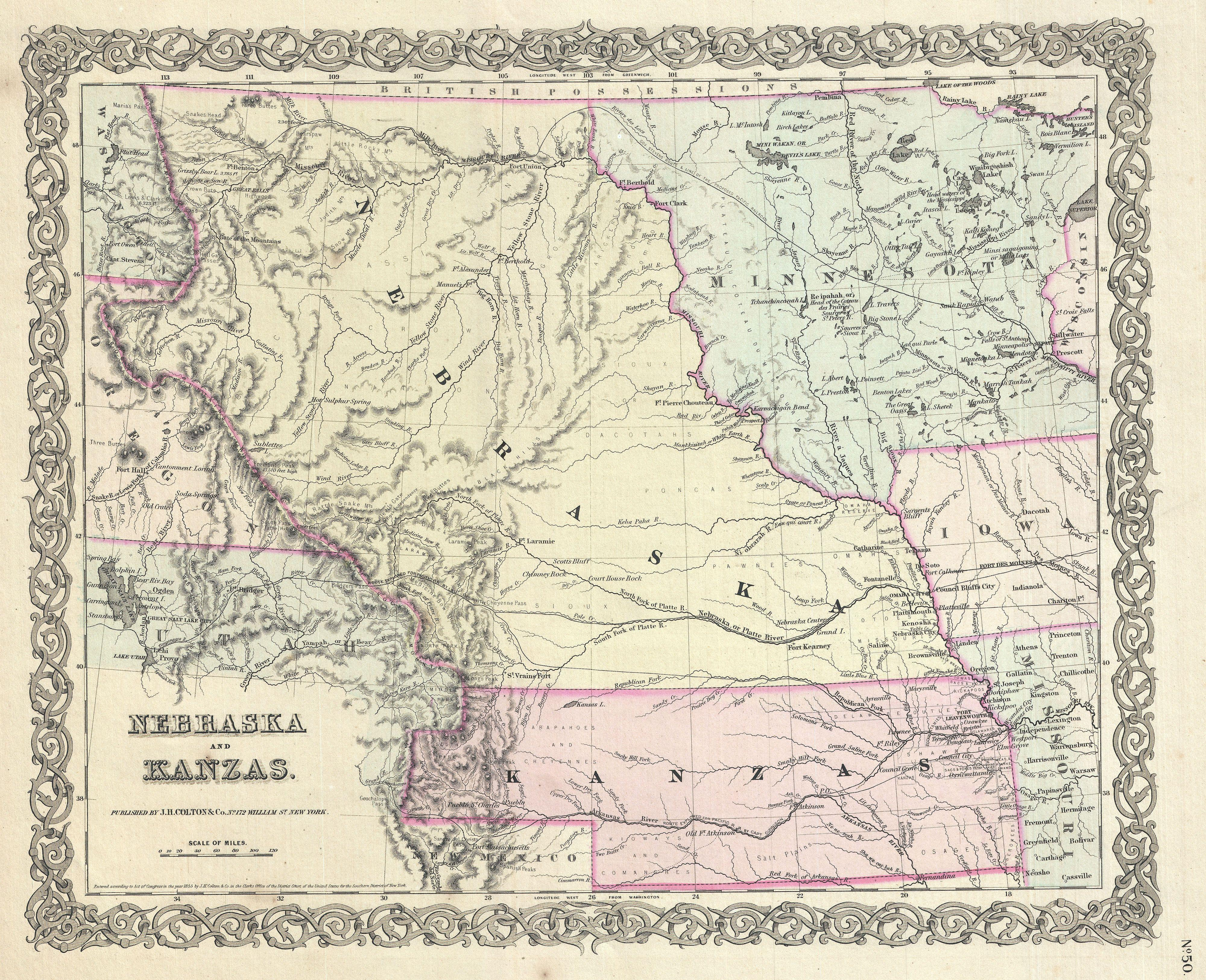
1855 first edition of Colton's map of the Nebraska and Kansas Territories

Emigration from the free states (including Iowa, Ohio, and other Midwestern and New England states), flowed into the territory beginning in 1854. These emigrants were known as Free-Staters. Because Missourians had claimed much of the land closest to the border, the Free-Staters were forced to establish settlements further into Kansas Territory. Among these were Lawrence, Topeka, and Manhattan.

To protect themselves against the encroachments of non-residents, the "Actual Settlers' Association of Kansas Territory" was formed. This association held a meeting on August 12, 1854, the object being the adoption of some regulations that should afford protection to the Free-State settlers, under laws not unlike those adopted by the pro-slavery squatters in the border region east.

== First Territorial appointments ==
The first territorial officers were appointed by President Pierce in June and July 1854. The first governor was Andrew Horatio Reeder, of Easton, Pennsylvania, appointed June 29, 1854, and removed July 28, 1858.

== Election of Territorial Legislature ==
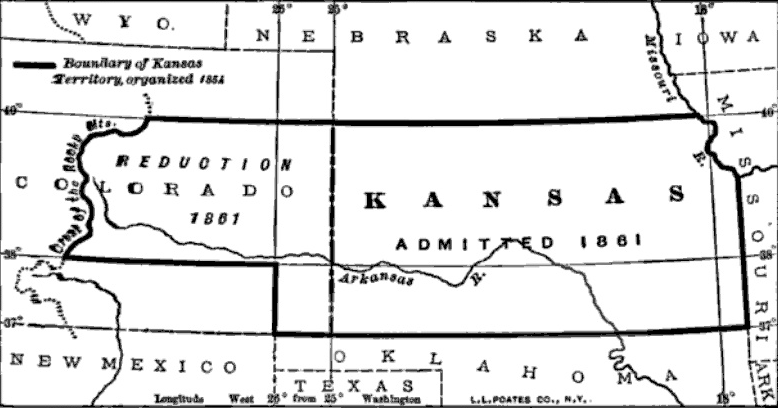
Territorial changes of Kansas

The territory's first legislative election was held on March 30, 1855. Thousands of armed "Border Ruffians" from Missouri entered Kansas that day, took over the polling places, and fraudulently voted in a pro-slavery Territorial Legislature. Antislavery candidates prevailed in one election district, the future Riley County.

The first session of the legislature was held in Pawnee, Kansas (within the boundary of modern-day Fort Riley), at the request of Governor Reeder. The two-story stone building still stands and is open to the public, as the First Territorial Capitol of Kansas. The building remained as the seat of the legislature for five days from July 2–6, 1855, then moved to the Shawnee Methodist Mission, nearer Missouri.

In the election of 1857, free-staters out-voted the pro-slavery settlers in the Territory, which meant that the Territorial Legislature fell into free-state hands. Then, on October 4, 1859, the Wyandotte Constitution was approved in a referendum by a vote of 10,421 to 5,530, and after its approval by the U.S. Congress, Kansas was admitted as a free state on January 29, 1861, shortly after the Southern legislators, who would never have permitted a new free state, had walked out. The last legislative act of the Territorial Legislature was the approval of the charter for the College of the Sisters of Bethany. This was February 2, 1861—four days after James Buchanan signed the act of Congress that officially brought Kansas into the Union.

== Bleeding Kansas ==
James H. Lane joined the Free-State movement in 1855 and became president of the Topeka Constitutional Convention, which met from October 23 to November 11, 1855. He was later a leader of "Jayhawkers." The first Free-state mass-meeting was in Lawrence on the evening of June 8, 1855; it was stated that persons from Missouri had invaded and had stolen elections to the legislature of the territory.

It was claimed that some Missourians had used violence toward the persons and property of the inhabitants of the Kansas Territory. It was agreed that Kansas should be a free State and that the stolen election was a gross outrage on the elective franchise and rights of freemen and a violation of the principles of popular sovereignty. Those attending did not feel bound to obey any law of illegitimate legislature enacted and opposed the establishment of slavery. The convention reserved the right to invoke the aid of the Federal government against the lawless course of the slavery propaganda in the territory.

== See also ==
- Constitutions of Kansas
- Historic regions of the United States
- History of Kansas
- Pike's Peak Country
- Territorial evolution of the United States
