= First Territorial Capitol of Kansas =

- First Territorial Capitol
- U.S. National Register of Historic Places
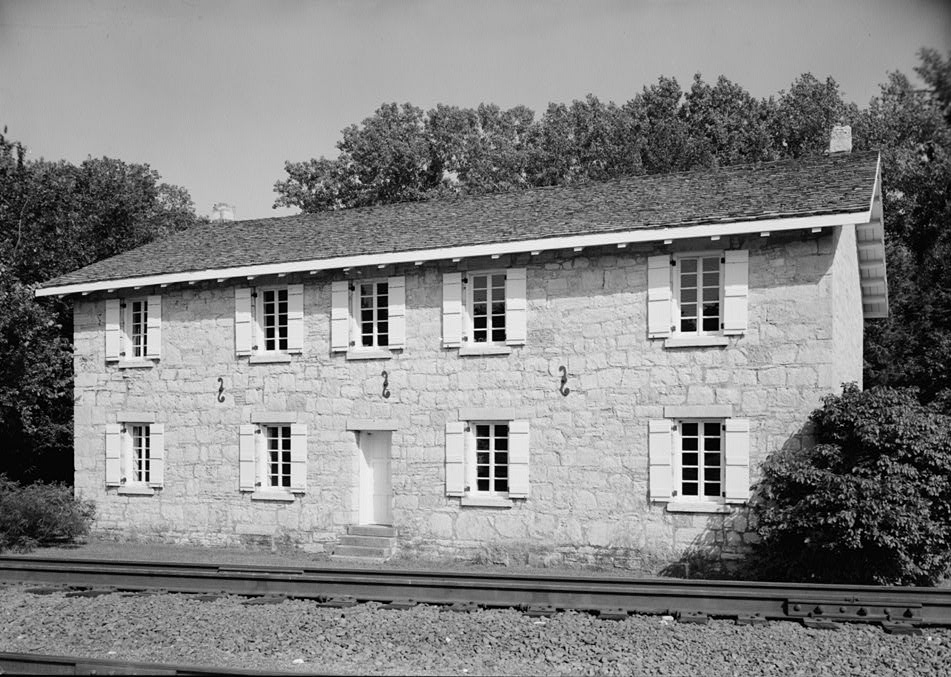
- First Territorial Capitol at Fort Riley

- Location within Kansas Location within the United States
- Nearest city: Junction City, Kansas
- Coordinates: 39°5′5″N 96°45′42″W
- Area: 2.8 acres (1.1 ha)
- Built: 1855
- NRHP reference No.: 70000249
- Added to NRHP: December 2, 1970

The First Territorial Capitol of Kansas (officially named First Territorial Capitol State Historic Site) is the sole remaining building of the ghost town of Pawnee, Kansas. The city served as the capital of the Kansas Territory for five days before it was moved to Shawnee Mission and then present day Lecompton, Kansas, and the town became part of neighboring Fort Riley. The building was the meeting place for the first elected Territorial Legislature in 1855. After falling into disrepair, the structure was restored in 1928 and today it serves as a history museum operated by the Kansas Historical Society and supported through The Partners of the First Territorial Capitol.

== Location and construction ==
The capitol is located in the Kaw valley of northeastern Kansas, 100 yards (91 m) north of the Kansas River. It first sat along the eastern border of Fort Riley, but today is within the boundaries of the base. A 2.8-acre (1.1 ha) site on which the building stands was provided to the Kansas Historical Society through a revocable license from the War Department in 1928. It is separated from the river by a grove of trees, and Union Pacific Railroad lines run parallel to the building close to its north side.

Construction began with about thirty workers under the direction of Warren Beckworth and was essentially completed in 1855. The building's foundation is roughly 40 by 80 feet (12 by 24 m), and it is two stories tall. Each floor is identically arranged for an assembly hall, with support columns down the center, and a stairway connecting the floors on the south side. Its foundation and walls are made of native limestone. A stone chimney is at each short side, with bricked exteriors. Its ceilings are exposed structural timbers. Doors are of wood with cut-stone thresholds, and window sills are also cut stone. Hanging lanterns for lighting were probably used. During its 1927 restoration, wood timbers were used that were chipped to make them look hand-cut. 2-inch (51 mm) planks were used for the floors and set with iron nails. Hand-forged hardware attached doors and windows. The roof was shingled with 3-foot (0.91 m) tiles split to resemble shakes.

== History ==
=== The legislature ===
The contentious first session of the legislature met for only five days in the Pawnee capitol, July 2–6, 1855. (Note: The start date is undisputed. However, some accounts claim that the legislature met at Pawnee for only four days rather than five. But The assembly passed legislation on the July 4th holiday, and Governor Reeder's report on his veto of it, published in The New York Times and citing the legislative record, said they worked on the sixth. Therefore, "five" is being used here.) Dissatisfied with the location and the condition of the building, they were determined (even before their arrival) to relocate to Shawnee Mission, where they would be closer to the Missouri constituents who illegally elected most of them. Thirteen members made up the council, which met on the capitol's second floor, and 26 comprised the house, which met on the first. Of the 39 total legislators, only eight had free-state ties while 31 were from the South. They ranged in age from 23 to 55.

Their first action was to unseat all but one of the free-state legislators by negating March election returns in favor of a special election held in May which replaced them with pro-slavery men. This helped earn them the lasting nickname, the Bogus Legislature. On July 3, Territorial Governor Andrew Reeder gave an address, during which the only remaining free-stater stood up and denounced his acts and those of his own colleagues. According to a 1928 address by Charles M. Harger, heated debate in the first days of the capitol included the phrases, "justice for all," "Southern rights," "The flag and the Constitution," and heard for the first time were pleas for "Kansas, the brightest star of all".

On July 4, the legislators passed their bill to move to Shawnee Mission, and quickly overrode the governor's veto of the measure. After adjourning on the sixth, they loaded up their property, and on horses and wagons headed for the new site, with the governor compelled to follow.

=== The capitol ===
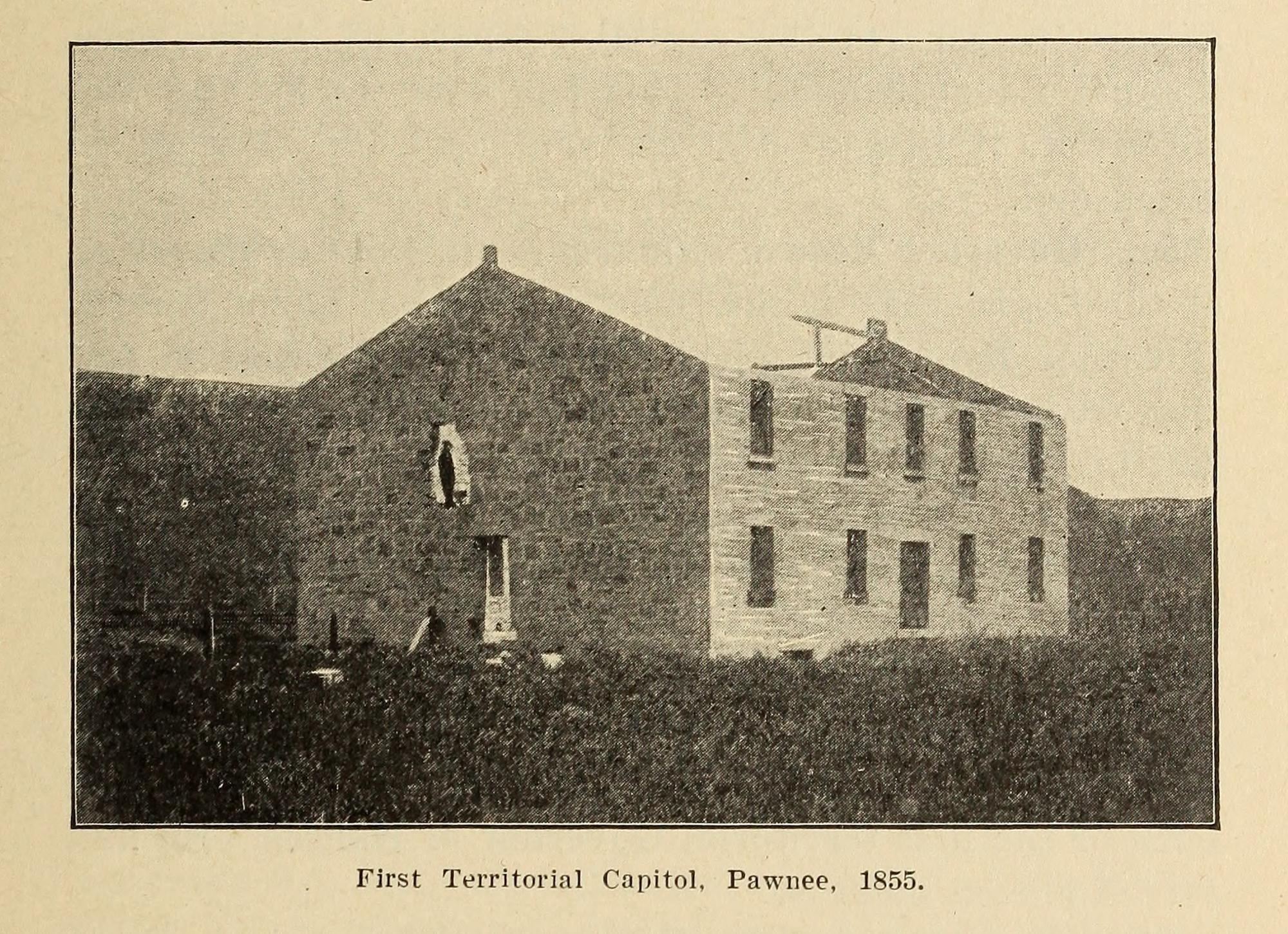
Under construction, still roofless and with a maintenance opening in the west end, 1855

Governor Reeder had announced in April, 1855, his intention to call the legislators to convene in Pawnee, at which time construction rapidly took place around town, including of the capitol. But the building was not finished when the designated date arrived – floorboards were not nailed down, windows and doors had not been installed and the roof was not finished. A hole in the exterior wall left for construction purposes still remained at the second floor. The builders even worked through day and night on the Sunday before the session to complete the project, but this added to the disgust of the legislators, as Pawnee was a community that recognized the Sabbath. "No good law could ever be enacted within the four walls that had witnessed such desecration," one lawmaker said, according to a town resident.

==== Other uses ====
After the legislature's departure, curious residents found the interior in disarray. Later, one townsman made the second floor of the building his residence. When Pawnee was ordered destroyed and its land reincorporated into Fort Riley, the first floor became home to the commissary department. Most of the town's buildings were demolished, but the former capitol building was spared and over time served a variety of other uses. In September 1855, it was used as a polling place for another election, corrupted again by Missourians charging a $2 (~$69.00 in 2025) fee for voting. The Army used it as a warehouse, and the building also housed a carpentry shop. After the tenant had moved out, it was used both as a bachelor's club and a place for ministers to work.

==== Restoration ====
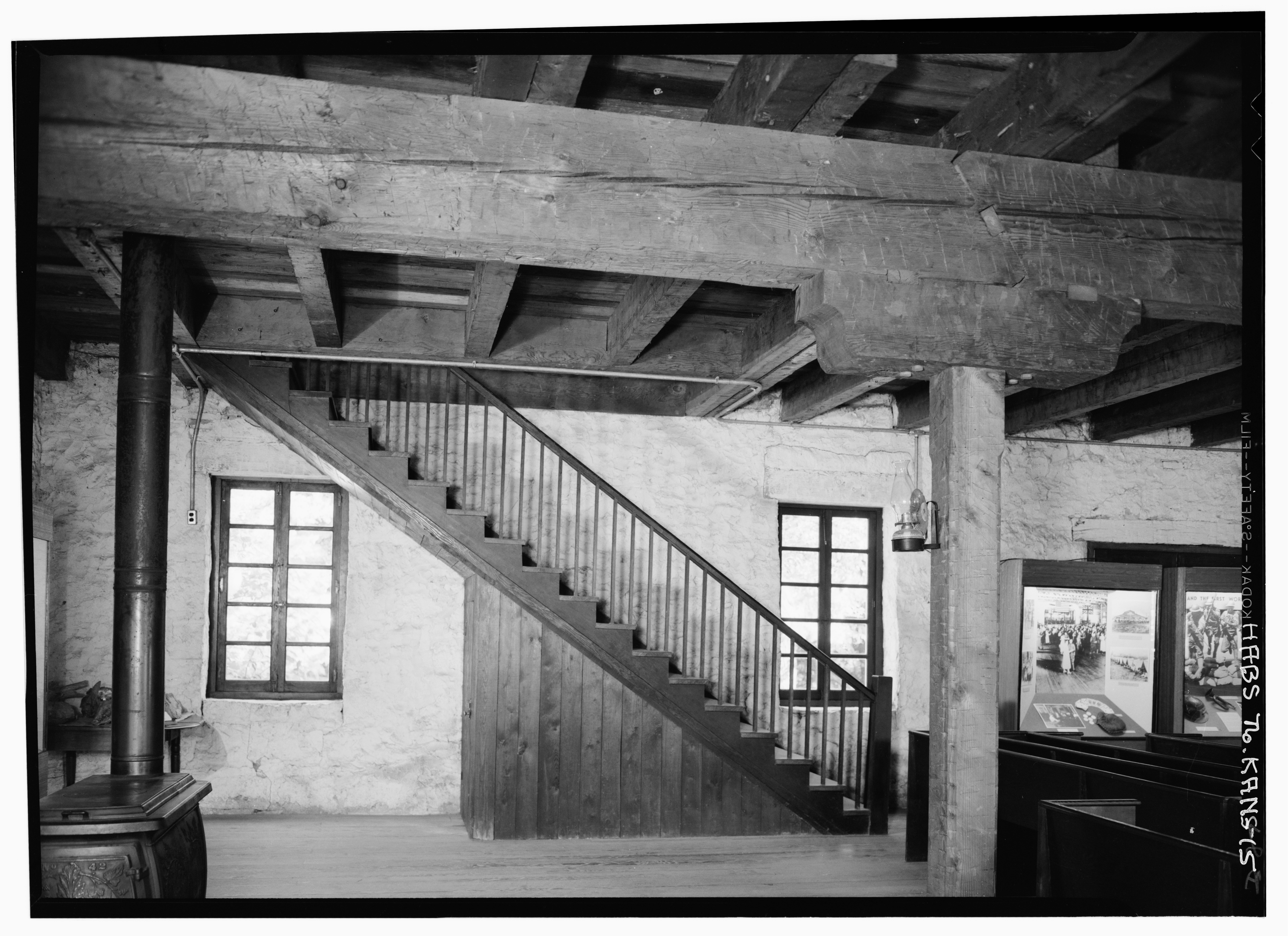
First floor stairway, with museum displays visible, 1965

Pawnee's demise was followed by neglect of the first capitol. In 1877 the roof was torn off in a windstorm, and the interior heavily damaged. Talk of preservation began around 1900, and in 1907 Col. Samuel F. Woolard of Wichita began raising a restoration fund. He later became president of the Kansas Historical Society. Historic restoration would be partially based on the memory of John Martin of Alabama, who had been a clerk for the first legislature.

By 1908, a total of $499.50 was raised by $5 (~$179.00 in 2025) subscriptions to the cause, allowing for much repair work to be done. Stone in the walls was replaced. Windows and doors were squared up. Cracks were filled with cement, and cement plaster covered walls after they were reinforced with iron. Union Pacific, partial landowner, was interested in the preservation at this time. The railroad company owed its creation to the first legislature, which established it as the Leavenworth, Pawnee & Western railroad franchise to build a transcontinental line through Kansas. In 1926, Governor Ben Paulen asked the legislature to help the preservation effort, and state Senator G. W. Schmidt introduced a bill appropriating $1,000 (~$14,147 in 2024) for this cause. But replacement of the roof alone cost $2,000, and Union Pacific provided over $20,000 for the whole project. Historic benches, chairs, desks, and stoves were purchased to refurnish the interior. The exterior grounds were cleaned up, a water main laid, and flagstone and gravel walkways were made. In 1927 it was designated a National Historic Place and on August 1, 1928, the site was dedicated.

Union Pacific President Carl R. Gray wanted a formal presentation of the site to the State of Kansas, and the company planned and paid for a grand celebration. Ten thousand people attended. Special trains were brought to the scene, including one with a collection of artifacts for viewing. Fort Riley personnel performed military ceremonies and music, while Native Americans held tribal dances. A flag was raised over the capitol that had previously flown over the Memorial Building in Topeka at the close of the Great War, while Governor Paulen was given a 20-gun salute (Note: This was not uncommon at the time, being one less than the traditional salute for a U.S. President and heads of state in other nations. A 20-gun salute also greeted Charles Lindbergh in 1928 when he landed the Spirit of St. Louis in Puerto Rico after a flight from St. Thomas. This was before the adoption in the U.S. of modern gun salute regulations. Today a state governor would receive a salute of 19 guns.) and reviewed National Guard troops. Barbecue was served to the crowd.

A mock legislative session was held, called together by State House Speaker D. M. Hamilton, and all attending lawmakers were clad in 1850s period attire. Paulen read Governor Reeder's message at the start of the session. During proceedings, a costumed man arose, declaring with a fiery speech that he was from Missouri and demanded a seat in the legislature. He was threatened by the other actors, but attentions were diverted by a faux Indian attack outside the building.

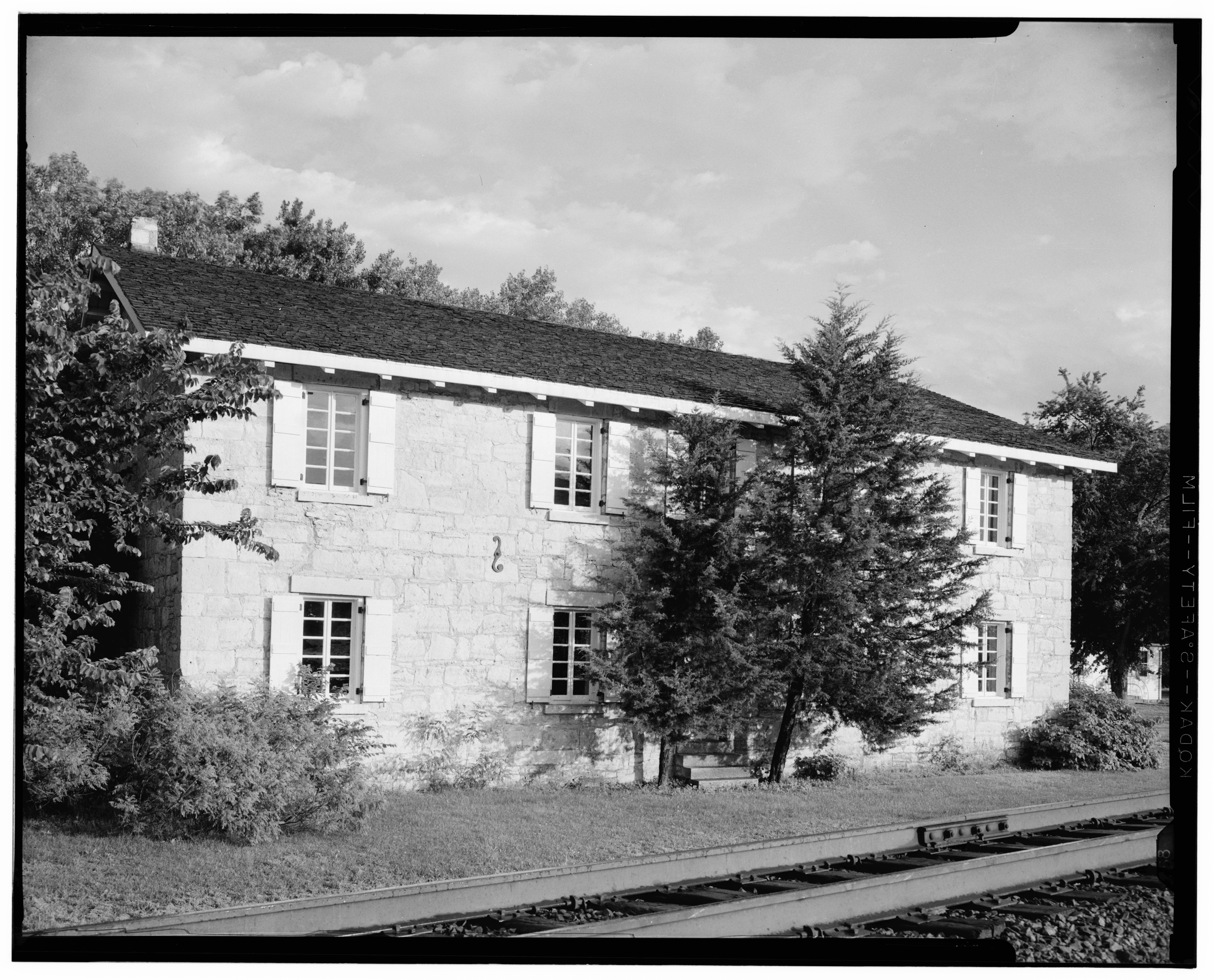
North side of the capitol, 1958

The official dedication wrapped up the events. Attendees at the celebration included:

- Governor and Mrs. Paulen
- Lieutenant Governor D. A. N. Chase
- Former Kansas Governor Willis J. Bailey
- U.S. Senator Charles Curtis
- U.S. Senator Arthur Capper
- Union Pacific President Gray, of Omaha, Nebraska

By 1958, trees planted on either side of all building entrances had become overgrown and blocked the doorways. These were removed before state legislators met for an actual session, for one day, in 1961, as part of statehood centennial celebrations.

== Museum ==
The capitol became a history museum in 1928. The structure was christened on August 1 with a speech by Union Pacific Solicitor General Nelson H. Loomis, who said those who congregated there that day, "...dedicate this restored captitol building as a memorial to the brave and patriotic men and women [who laid the foundations of the state and built its railroads] who toiled and suffered that their children might enjoy the wholesome pleasures and delights which the wise maker of the Universe intended for those who should dwell in this beautiful and radiant land which we call Kansas." The First Territorial Capitol State Historic Site features exhibits on Kansas Territory, rail and river travel in the region, and the history of Pawnee. Because the museum is on an active U.S. Army base, there are restrictions on visitors, including requirements for photo identification.
