= Pawnee, Kansas =

Ghost town in Geary County, Kansas

- Ghost town
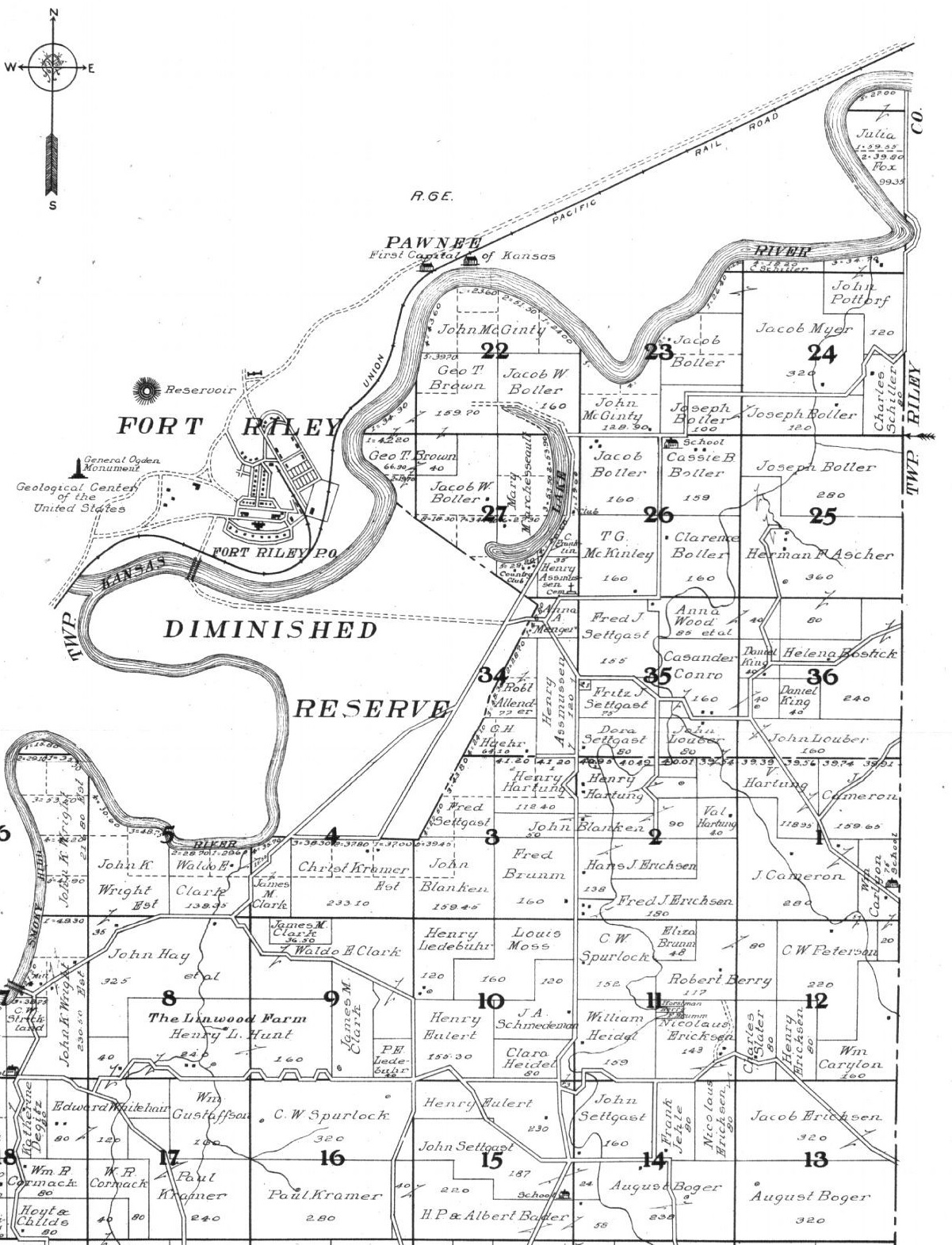
- The plats of northern Jefferson Township, Geary County, Kansas, showing Fort Riley and Pawnee across the Kansas River. 1909.

- Location within Kansas Location within the United States
- Coordinates: 39°5′6″N 96°45′42″W
- Country: United States
- State: Kansas
- County: Geary
- Named for: Pawnee people
- Elevation: 1,053 ft (321 m)

Population
  - Total: 0
- Time zone: UTC-6 (CST)
  - Summer (DST): UTC-5 (CDT)
- Area code: 785
- GNIS ID: 482209

Pawnee is a ghost town in Geary County, Kansas, United States, which briefly served as the first official capital of the Kansas Territory in 1855. Pawnee was the territorial capital for exactly five days – the legislature met there from July 2 to July 6 – before legislators voted to move the capital to Shawnee Mission, which is located in present-day Fairway. It may be the shortest-lived capital of any U.S. state or territory (Colorado City also served as the capital of the newly established Colorado Territory for five days in 1862 but was not federally recognized).

== History ==
=== Early history ===
For many millennia, the Great Plains of North America was inhabited by nomadic Native Americans. From the 16th century to 18th century, the Kingdom of France claimed ownership of large parts of North America. In 1762, after the French and Indian War, France secretly ceded New France to Spain, per the Treaty of Fontainebleau. In 1802, Spain returned most of the land to France. In 1803, most of the land for modern day Kansas was acquired by the United States from France as part of the 828,000 square mile Louisiana Purchase for 2.83 cents per acre. In 1854, the Kansas Territory was organized.

=== Establishing the town ===
Pawnee, named after a native tribe that had inhabited its land, was located on the far western frontier of Kansas Territory, between the new settlement of Manhattan and the U.S. Army post at Fort Riley. Pawnee was first laid out in 1854. Fort Riley's commander, Colonel William R. Montgomery, authorized the acquisition by the Pawnee Town Association investors of 400 acres believed to be part of the military reservation. In December 1854 or January 1855, the site was selected as capital by recently-commissioned first Territorial Governor Andrew Reeder, after his delayed arrival from Pennsylvania. Governor Reeder had an economic stake in the site, since he was one of the investors and a new landowner in the settlement, and he was not disappointed: Within six weeks of his announcement, hundreds of people arrived in the town. It quickly sprouted new homes, stores, and hotels, and he soon built a two-story log cabin there that became known as the "Governor's Mansion".

=== Electing the Territorial Legislature ===
The Governor had failed to take an accurate territorial census before the first election of representatives to help ensure valid results. The February 1855 census showed 36 residents in Pawnee, but 75 votes were cast there in the March 30 election, held at the home of Robert Klotz. The number reflected emigrants who had arrived within that month, and election returns indicated no illegal voters at Pawnee. (Note: In an 1856 report to Congress, judges certified 75 true tallies.) The same, however, could not be said at polling places throughout much of the rest of the territory, as more than 800 illegal votes were identified in both Lawrence and Leavenworth and more than 4,000 territory-wide.

Free-state interests had been bolstered by the arrival of new settlers from New England who were aided by the Emigrant Aid Company. But many free-staters felt that Reeder had intentionally delayed the spring election until pro-slavery men from neighboring Missouri could arrive and cast votes they should not have been allowed. Missouri residents overran the polling places and threatened legitimate voters who were residents or planned to be such. Ultimately, only eight of the 39 men elected had free-state intentions.

=== One week of action ===
The Territorial Legislature first met in Pawnee on July 2, 1855, composed mostly of the pro-slavery delegates fraudulently elected. They were unhappy that Governor Reeder had put the capital over 100 miles from the Missouri border, feeling that the location favored the free-state advocates in Kansas Territory. What the legislators feared was precisely Reeder's intention, as he believed a free Kansas favored his personal land interests throughout the territory.

Undiscouraged, the pro-slavery legislators' first action was to unseat all but one of the free-state men, and one who lost his position exclaimed that they were, "lighting the watchfires of war". The only free-state legislator who remained, Martin Conway, appeared also to be at odds with Reeder, standing during the Governor's opening address to denounce the body and proclaim that he was prepared to dishonor any of its laws. Despite the Governor and Conway, another quick action the legislators took was a successful vote to move the capital to Shawnee Mission, on the Missouri border. Governor Reeder vetoed the measure, recalling the expense the town of Pawnee had already taken to build the capital city. The Territorial Legislature overrode his veto, and next met in Shawnee on July 16. Nevertheless, Reeder continued to insist Pawnee was the capital, vetoing any legislation that reached him, believing that the lawmakers were not in legal session.

Because of its unscrupulous origin and actions, the group became known as the Bogus Legislature. The pro-slavery men had never intended to reside in Pawnee, ignoring the nearby boarding houses available and arriving prepared to camp outside. After the vote to relocate, the Kansas Legislature never stayed in Pawnee again – July 6, 1855 was its last day as capital city – it served only five days. (Note: Some accounts claim that the legislature met at Pawnee for only four days rather than five. However, Governor Reeder in his own testimony to the 34th United States Congress, said the legislature adjourned, "about the sixth of July," and his own report on his veto, published in the New York Times and citing the legislative record, said definitively that the legislature met on the sixth. They passed the Shawnee measure on the July 4th holiday, and therefore, "five" is being used here.)

=== Destruction ===
Soon after Pawnee lost its function as capital, in September 1855, Jefferson Davis, the Secretary of War, surveyed the settlement and showed the results to U.S. President Franklin Pierce. On the resulting map, the survey indicated the eastern boundary of Fort Riley both with and without Pawnee, and the lines excluding the town were accepted. It was ordered to be destroyed and its land reincorporated back into Fort Riley. Notices signed by Pierce were posted on every structure instructing everyone to leave by October 10. A Major Cook with 1,000 of his Texas troops were charged with evacuating the residents, many of whom were unwilling to leave. By the night of the 10th, some residents still remained. The Governor's Mansion, abandoned by its first tenant who unhappily left for Shawnee, was pulled down with its next residents still inside. In another home, a woman with her infant was carried out on a mattress and taken across the border line of the reservation. Most of the buildings, including all of its houses, were demolished, meaning financial ruin for many families. Other Kansas towns developed under similar circumstances but lacking significant free-state aspirants did not suffer the same fate.

== Pawnee later and today ==
Many residents left town with the legislators immediately after their adjournment on July 6. Those who did not were faced with a cholera outbreak in August. Fort Riley was also affected. Union Pacific Railroad lines reached the abandoned town in 1866 – as part of a transcontinental route approved by the Pawnee legislature – passing just yards away from the north side of the capitol. Its passage through Pawnee was due in part to the unreliability of the nearby river for navigation.

=== First Territorial Capitol State Historic Site ===
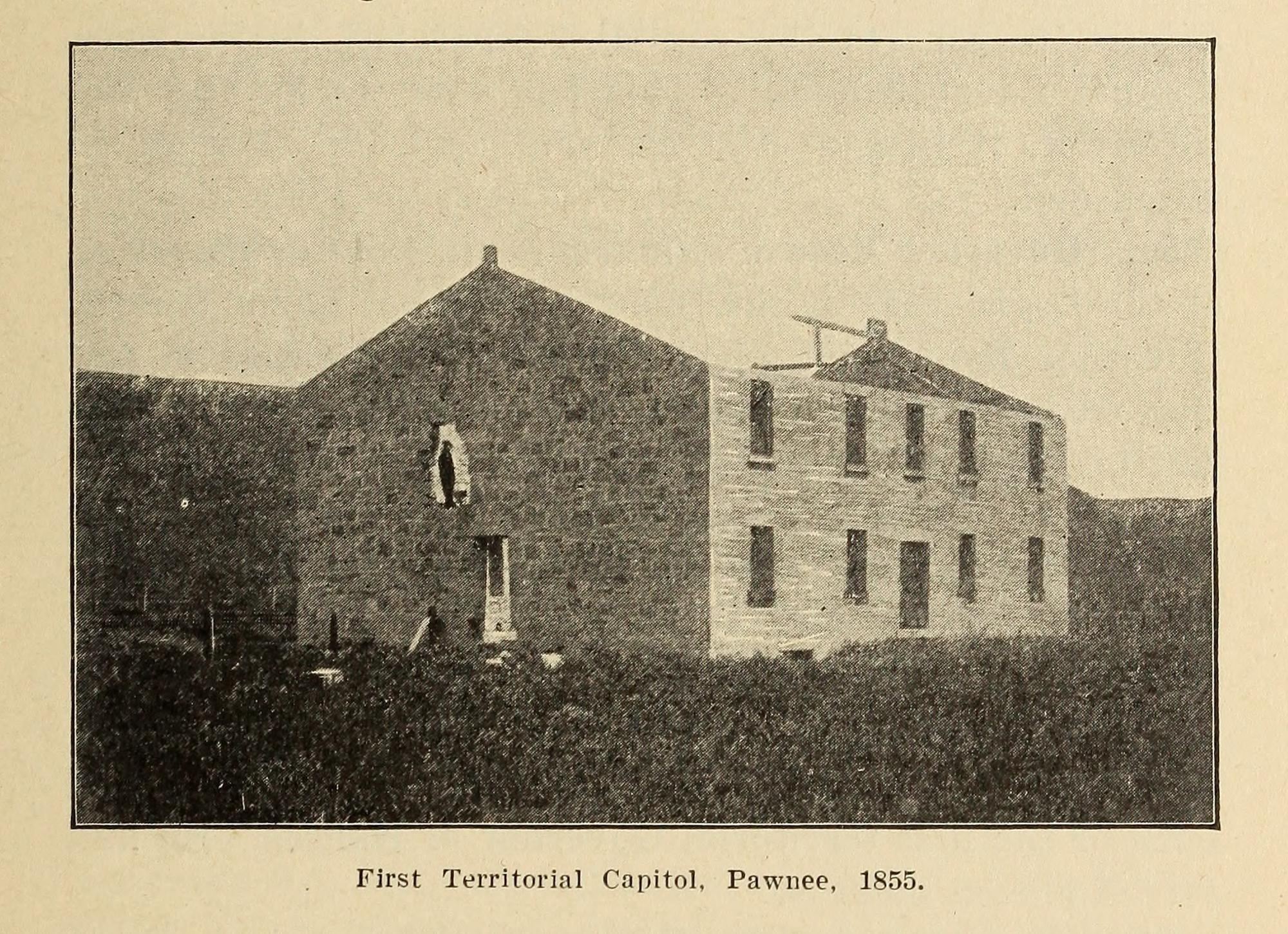
The capitol under construction.

Davis had determined most of the town to be within the boundaries of Fort Riley; its eastern edge at the mouth of Onemile Creek. Only the capitol building was spared from demolition. During its brief service by the legislature, it was a very uncomfortable meeting space due partly to the fact that it was not complete. The floor boards were not nailed down, and a hole in the exterior wall left for construction purposes still remained at the second floor.

After the legislature departed, townspeople entered the building and found, according to one of them, "...a room full of confusion and disorder. Torn pamphlets, scraps of papers, and rubbish of all descriptions were scattered about." (Note: The resident quoted was a "Mrs. Hadden". No first name was given by the source.) The awkward edifice was used shortly afterward as a warehouse.

The structure, now listed on the National Register of Historic Places, is within the current boundary of the military reservation, and has since served a variety of other uses. It has also functioned as a church, a bachelor's club, housing and a carpentry shop. In the 1920s the Kansas Historical Society and Union Pacific took over responsibility for the building and repaired it. It was rededicated in 1928 with a grand celebration and became a history museum. In 1961, the state legislature met in the Pawnee capitol again, for one day, during statehood centennial celebrations.

Today the museum features exhibits on Kansas Territory, rail and river travel in the region, and the history of Pawnee. Because it is now part of a military installation, arrangements must be made in advance for the general public to visit the museum. A driving tour of the base is available, featuring several historic sites, including the First Territorial Capitol.

== See also ==
- Pawnee people – The tribe behind the name
- Bleeding Kansas – Details of the ongoing conflict
- Kansas–Nebraska Act – The federal bill that created the problems
- Capitals of the United States – Historic locations, including of the territories
- Geographic center of the contiguous United States – A more commonly accepted location (near Lebanon, Kansas) of the midpoint of the adjoining 48 states, marked, perhaps mistakenly, on the 1909 Jefferson Township plat map. It is identified on this map as "Geological Center of the United States". (Note: A writer for the document meant to accompany the Fort Riley driving tour says of this identification, "This is obviously not the case," but the reality is that the location of any "center" is imprecise due to many factors.)
