= 1st Signal Command (United States) =

- Shoulder Sleeve Insignia
- Active: 25 April 1967 – March 1969
- Country: United States
- Branch: U.S. Army
- Current status: Inactive

The 1st Signal Command was a Signal Corps command of the United States Army, based at Fort Riley between 1967 and 1969.

== History ==
The command was constituted on 19 April 1967 in the Regular Army as Headquarters and Headquarters Company, 1st Signal Command, and activated at Fort Riley on 25 April 1967. Based at Camp Funston, the command was subordinate to the headquarters of the 23rd Field Army Support Command. It was inactivated in March 1969.

== Heraldic items ==
=== Shoulder sleeve insignia ===
- Description: On an orange disc within a 1/8 inch (0.32 cm) white border 2 3/8 inches (6.0 cm) overall, three white rings graduating in size and having a common tangent at the base, the smallest circle surrounding a blue roundel all surmounted by a vertical blue lightning flash issuing from lower border and extending to top border.
- Symbolism:
1. The blue lightning streak on target symbolizes the 1st Signal Command's ability to carry on all functions of its mission with speed and accuracy.
2. The white rings refer to the emanating effect of transmitting radio waves through space.
3. The single lightning flash (1) further distinguishes the 1st Signal Command.
4. Orange and white are colors used by the Signal Corps.
- Background: The shoulder sleeve insignia was approved on 24 July 1968.

== Citations ==
=== Bibliography ===
- Raines, Rebecca R. (2005). Signal Corps (PDF). Army Lineage Series. Washington, D.C.: United States Army Center of Military History. Archived from the original (PDF) on 29 August 2017.
