= Shawnee Methodist Mission =

- Shawnee Mission
- U.S. National Register of Historic Places
- U.S. National Historic Landmark
- The historic site in 2021
- Location: 3403 W. 53rd Street, Fairway, Kansas
- Coordinates: 39°1′59.2818″N 94°37′26.796″W
- Area: 12 acres (4.9 ha)
- Built: 1839
- NRHP reference No.: 66000345

Significant dates
- Added to NRHP: October 15, 1966
- Designated NHL: May 23, 1968

Shawnee Methodist Mission, also known as the Shawnee Mission, which later became the Shawnee Indian Manual Labor School, is located in Fairway, Kansas, United States. Designated as a National Historic Landmark in 1968, the Shawnee Methodist Mission is operated by the city as a museum. The site is owned by the Kansas Historical Society and administered as the Shawnee Indian Mission State Historic Site.

The Shawnee Indian Manual Labor Boarding School served briefly as the second capital of the Kansas Territory, when the legislature was controlled by pro-slavery advocates. The building held that designation from July 16 to August 7, 1855.

The Shawnee Methodist Mission is the origin of the Shawnee Mission name used by the United States Postal Service to refer to the Kansas City Metropolitan Area suburban communities in northeastern Johnson County. The Shawnee Mission School District serves those communities.

== History ==
=== Shawnee Indian Mission ===
Shawnee Indians, along with many other eastern tribes, were moved to present-day Kansas in the 1820s and 1830s. In 1830 Chief Fish, leader of the Shawnees, requested a missionary and Reverend Thomas Johnson, a Methodist minister, was appointed to the Shawnees. Rev. Johnson was born in Virginia and later moved to Missouri. He was proslavery and in fact, a slave owner. Johnson proposed that a school be built to serve many tribes. A site was chosen just west of the Missouri border, where the Santa Fe, California and Oregon Trails passed through the Shawnee lands.

The school opened as a day school with one initial building, now the West building, at the present Johnson County location in October 1839. At the height of its activity, the mission was an establishment of more than 2,000 acres (810 ha) with 16 buildings, including the three large brick structures, which still stand, and an enrollment of nearly 150 Native American boys and girls from the ages of 5 to 23. Native children from 22 different tribes were sent to this school to learn basic academics, including English, manual arts, and agriculture. The East building served as the main chapel, boy's classroom, and boy's dormitory in the attic. The North building was the main location for the girl's classrooms and bedrooms.

In 1854 Kansas Territory was established. Andrew Reeder, newly appointed territorial governor, had his offices at the mission. The first territorial legislature met at the mission, with Johnson serving as President of the legislature. It was during this legislative session that the so-called "bogus laws" were passed to perpetuate slavery in Kansas. In 1858 Reverend Thomas Johnson turned the school over to his oldest son, Alexander, who ran the mission until it closed in 1862. The Mission closed during the era of "Bleeding Kansas" and the "border wars" and served as a Union Soldiers encampment during the Battle of Westport until 1864. The site was private property until it was secured by the Kansas State Historical Society in 1927 as a state site, and was deemed a National Historic Landmark in 1968.

=== The Shawnee ===
The "Fish" Shawnee tribe had been removed from its traditional Ohio home to the unorganized territories set aside for Native Americans (in the future state of Kansas) under the terms of the Treaty of St. Louis (1825). The mission was initially built on land near the American Shawnee Indian Tribe reserve in Turner by Reverend Thomas Johnson. He hoped to convert the recently relocated tribe to Christianity.

During the 1830s, some of the Shawnees' most venerated men, including Tenskwatawa, "the Shawnee Prophet", frequently visited the mission. The Prophet was the younger brother of Tecumseh, who had led a war against the United States earlier in the century. Tenskwatawa led the Shawnee in Tecumseh's absence at the Battle of Tippecanoe in 1811. Following defeat in this battle, Tenskwatawa took his men to the British Canadian colonies. He was placed under virtual house arrest for years following the end of the War of 1812. Tenskwatawa was eventually allowed to return to the Shawnee to help them remove from Ohio to Kansas; he died in 1836 at his village (the present site of Kansas City, Kansas).

=== New mission ===
The mission was located at its original site from 1830 to 1839. In 1839, the mission was moved and built at its present-day Johnson County location, and an Indian boarding school was opened there. From 1839 until its closure in 1862, the Shawnee Mission served as a manual training school for Native Americans, principally from the Shawnee and Delaware (Lenape) tribes.

The Shawnee Mission also served briefly as the second capital of the Kansas Territory. The capital was moved to the mission on July 16, 1855, after pro-slavery delegates to the Territorial Legislature voted to depart the first Territorial Capitol of Kansas at Pawnee. It served as the territorial capital until August 8, when the seat of government became Lecompton. While the capital was located at Shawnee Mission, the legislature promulgated the controversial pro-slavery laws that sparked Bleeding Kansas violence. During the American Civil War, the site served as a camp for Union soldiers.

== Administration ==
The Shawnee Mission is managed by the City of Fairway through an agreement with the Kansas Historical Society, which owns it. It was declared a National Historic Landmark in 1968.

== Gallery ==
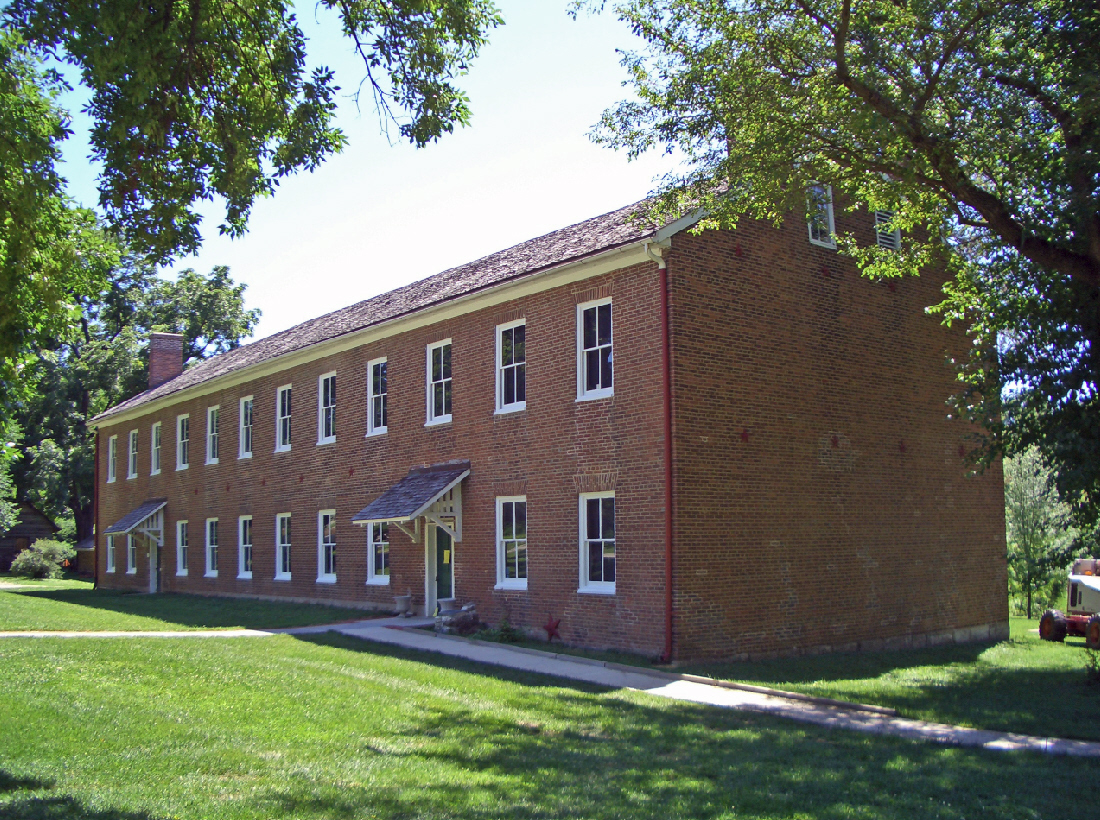
East Building, front

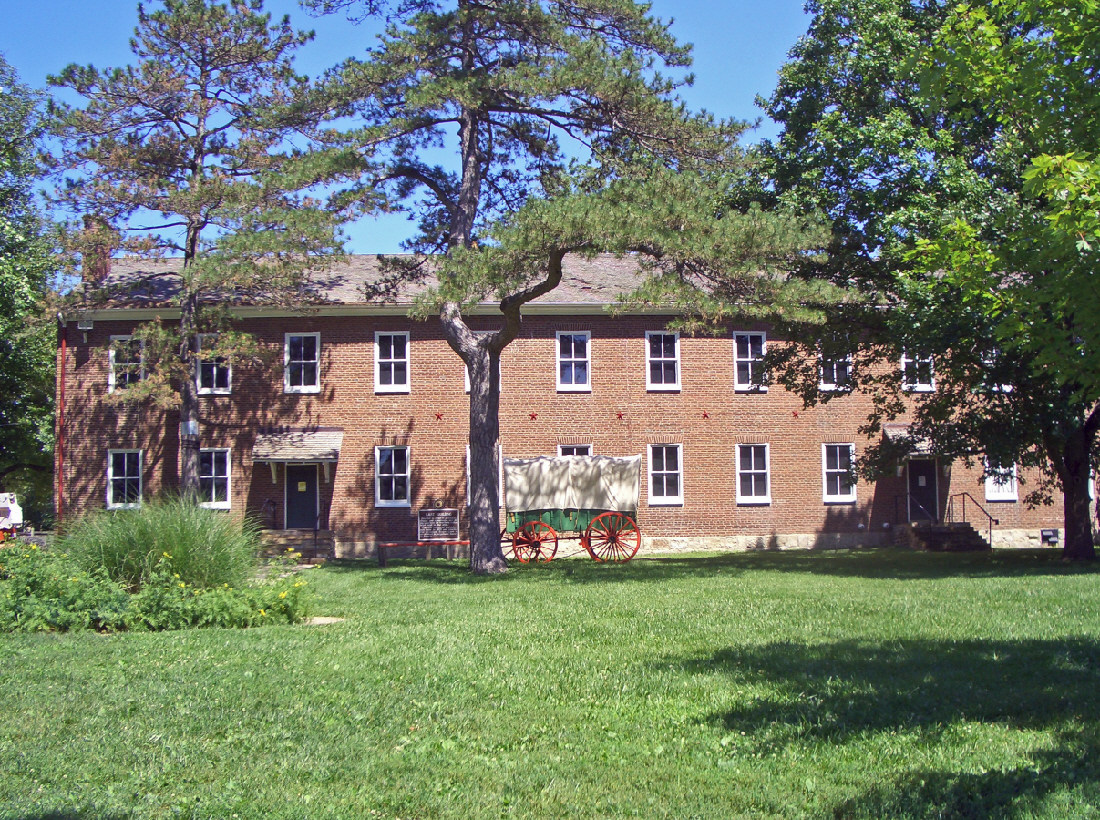
East Building, back

North Building

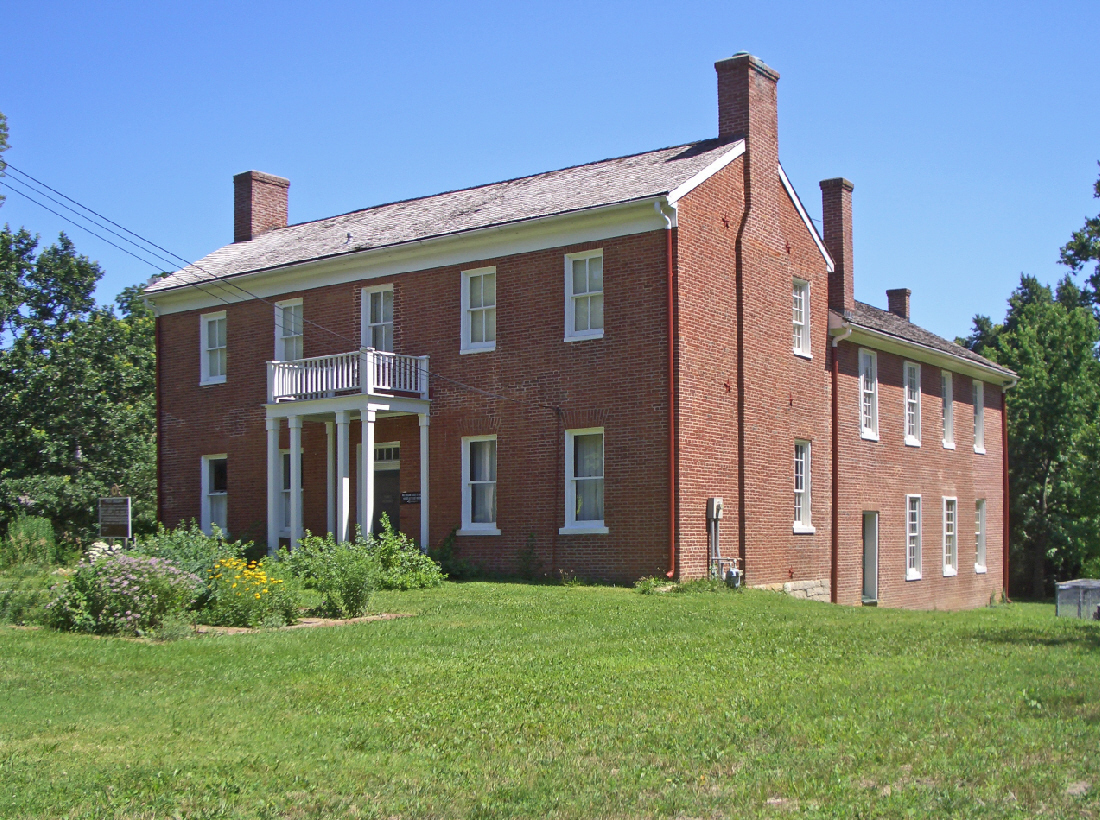
West Building

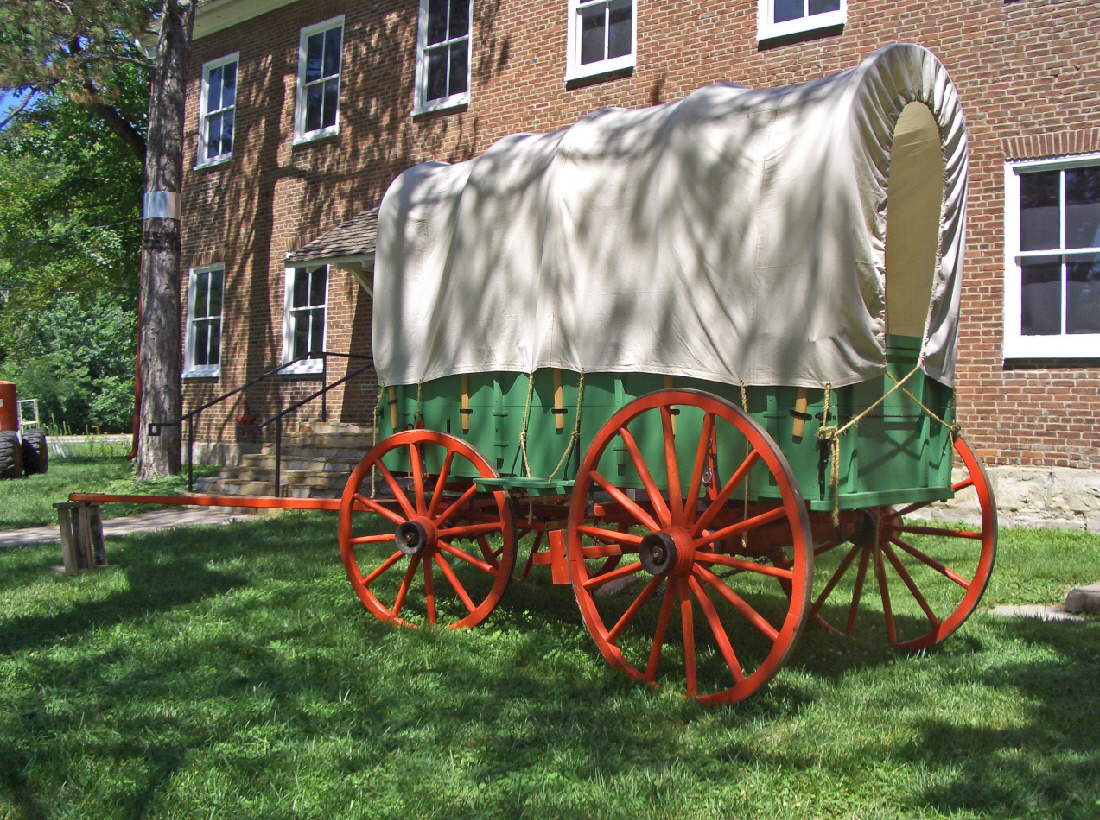
Conestoga wagon

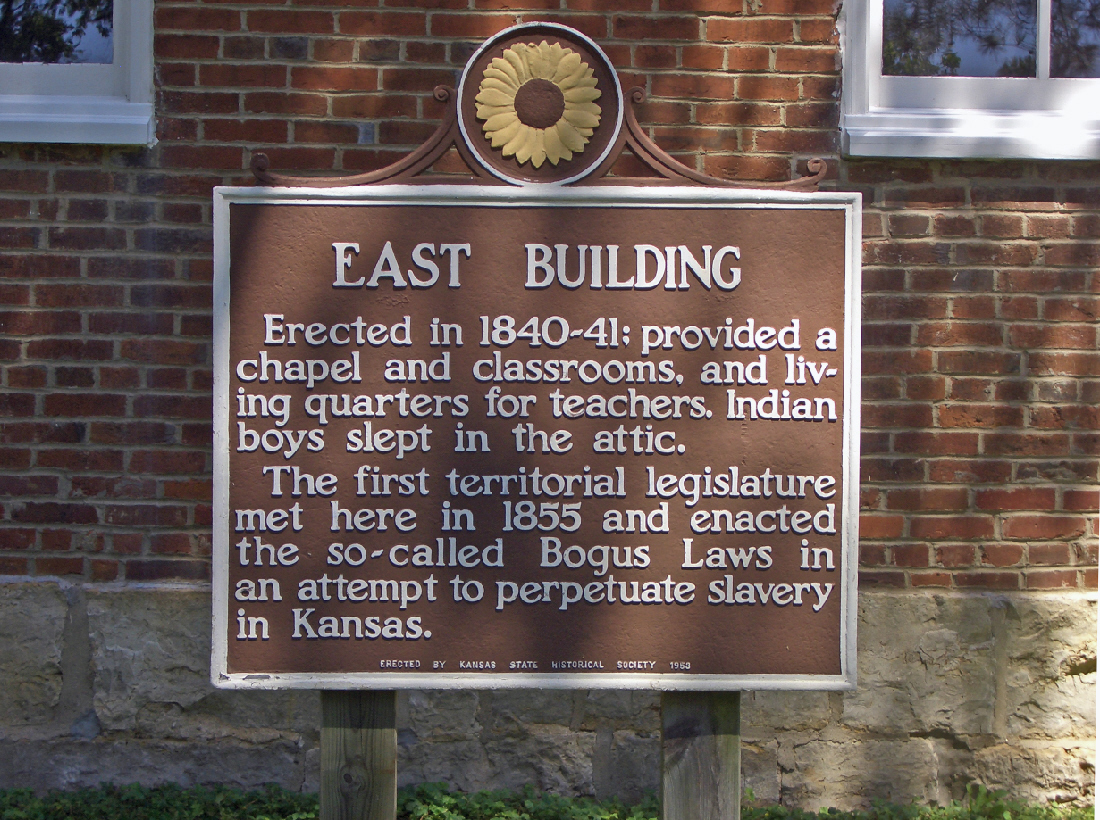
East Building sign

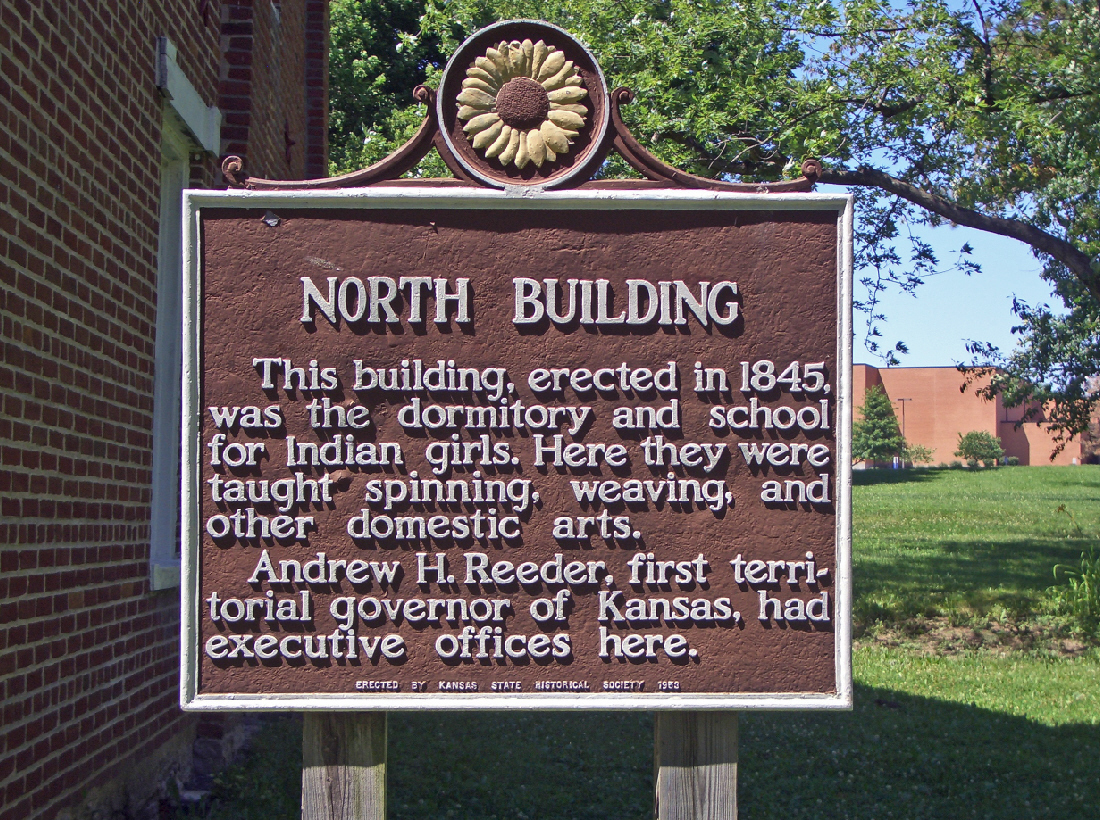
North Building sign

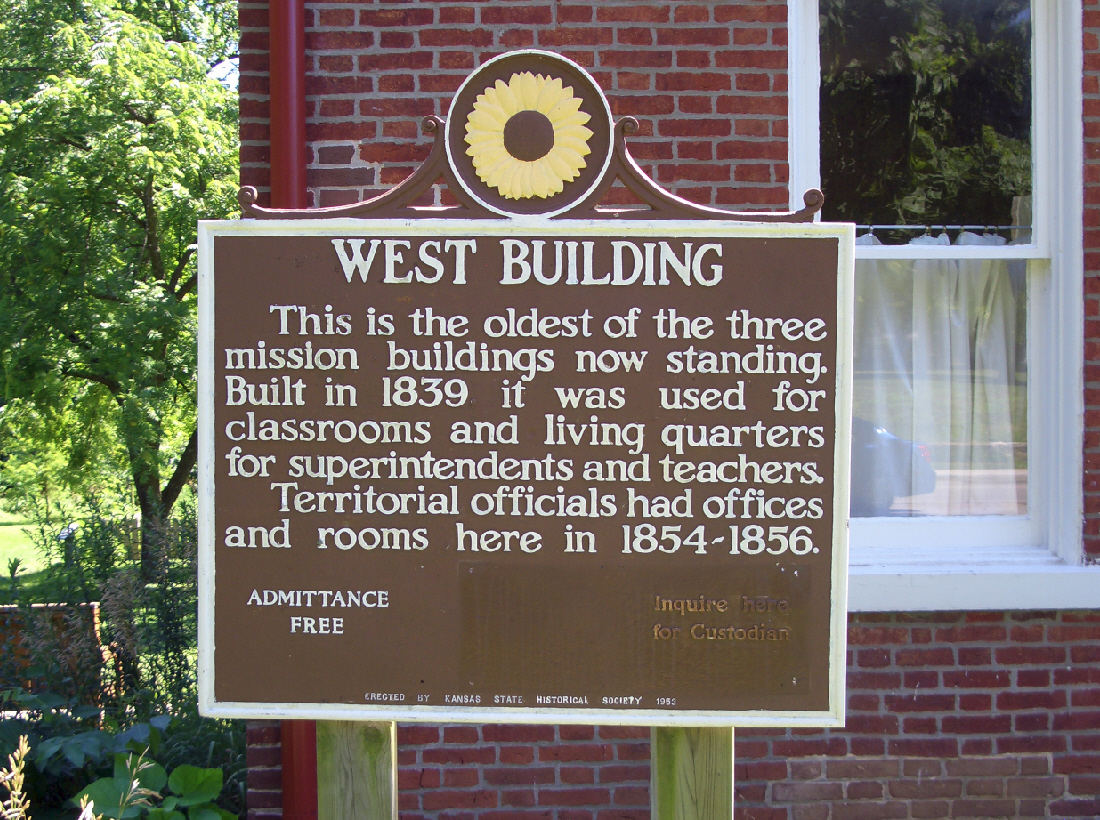
West Building sign

== See also ==
- List of capitals in the United States
- List of National Historic Landmarks in Kansas
