= Custer Home =

Coordinates: 39.062691°N 96.781955°W

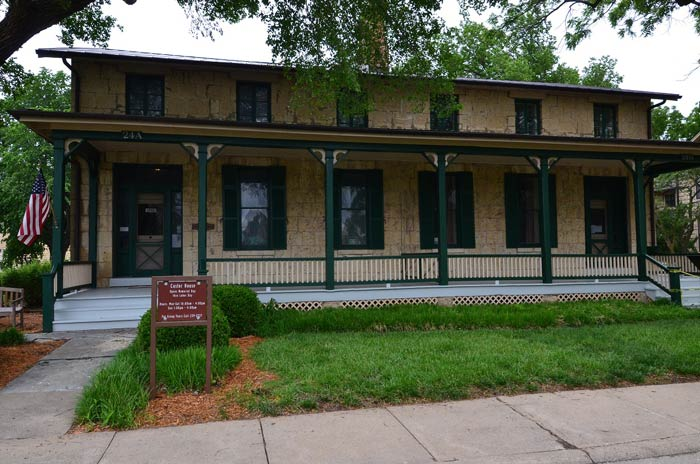

- Location within Kansas
- Location: Fort Riley, Kansas, United States
- Type: Military museum
- Curator: Robert J. Smith
- Website: history.army.mil/Army-Museum-Enterprise/Find-an-Army-Museum/Custer-House/

Constructed in 1855 of native limestone, the Custer House is a historic house museum located on Fort Riley in Kansas, United States. It reflects Fort Riley's earliest history and authentically depicts military home life on the western frontier during the Indian Wars Period.

It is largely unchanged from its original design and furnished with period furniture from the 1880 through the 1890s.

Originally thought to have been the home of George Armstrong Custer, later research showed that General and Mrs. Custer occupied the sister-set of quarters (#21) while stationed here in 1866.

== Visitor access ==
Custer House, located at #24, Sheridan Ave., is open during the summer season for visitors (from Memorial Day to Labor Day). Hours are 10 a.m. to 4 p.m., Monday - Saturday and 1-4 p.m., Sundays. Visitor access is free; donations are suggested.

Custer House is also available, upon request, by coordinating with the nearby Fort Riley Cavalry Museum.

Since the museum is on an active U.S. Army post, there are minor restrictions on visitors, namely a requirement for state or federally issued photo identification (e.g. a driver's license).
