= Kansas Historical Society =

American state historical society

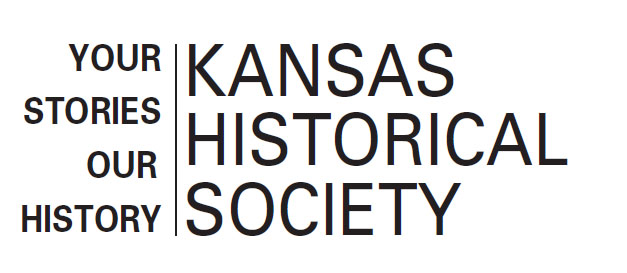

Agency overview
- Formed: 1875
- Jurisdiction: Kansas
- Headquarters: 6425 SW 6th Avenue Topeka, Kansas, U.S. 39°3′24.19″N 95°46′33.04″W
- Agency executives: Patrick Zollner, Executive Director; Matthew Chappell, Divisions Director
- Parent agency: State of Kansas
- Website: KSHS

The Kansas Historical Society is the official state historical society of Kansas. Headquartered in Topeka, Kansas, United States, it operates as "the trustee of the state" for the purpose of maintaining the state's history and operates the Kansas Museum of History, Kansas State Archives and Library, Kansas State Capitol Tour Center, and 18 state-owned sites. It also serves as the State Historic Preservation Office, and works closely with the Kansas State Department of Education to provide standards-based programs for history and social studies curriculum in the schools.

== History ==
The Kansas Editors' and Publishers' Association founded the Kansas Historical Society in 1875 to save present and past records. In 1879, the Kansas Legislature enacted legislation that recognized the Historical Society as "the trustee of the state" for the purpose of maintaining the state's history. Since then, the Historical Society has continued to enjoy the support of the state's newspaper publishers and has built one of the nation's most comprehensive statewide newspaper collections.

For nearly 40 years, the Historical Society occupied a succession of quarters in the statehouse as its holdings steadily grew. In 1914, the collections were moved to the grand and newly constructed Memorial Building in downtown Topeka. In 1984, the Kansas Museum of History moved to an 80-acre (320,000 m^{2}) site in west Topeka near the Potawatomi Mission leaving the remaining agencies still housed in the Memorial Building. The historic Stach School later joined the complex. During July and August 1995, the vast collections of library, archival, manuscript, and archeological materials were moved to new facilities in the State Archives and Library on the west Topeka site. In this headquarters, the Historical Society was reunited at one location.

The Kansas Historical Society is a state agency. Its sister organization, Kansas State Historical Society, Inc., operates as a non-profit membership organization. More than six million individuals benefit from the Historical Society's programs and services each year. All activities and programs are conducted by the private organization and the Historical Society's six divisions: Administration, Cultural Resources, Education and Outreach, Historic Sites, Museum, and State Archives & Library.

The state agency operates with an annual appropriation of approximately six million dollars and approximately 100 employees. The executive director—who is nominated by the governor and approved by the state legislature—is responsible for the Historical Society's overall governance. The corporation offers membership to the public and institutions, manages grants for the state agency, operates the Museum Stores, and provides fiscal support for various programs, including the Historical Society's magazine, Reflections, and its scholarly journal, Kansas History: A Journal of the Central Plains. The journal has won awards from the Western History Association and the American Association for State and Local History. Its editorial offices are now at Kansas State University, which has served as co-publisher since 2013.

During the past century, the Historical Society's role expanded beyond its original emphasis on collecting and publishing research. The Historical Society continues these fundamental activities and has added a broad array of interpretive and educational programs that combine with historic sites, technical assistance, and field service programs. Through collections, exhibits, programs, and services, the Historical Society helps the public in understanding and valuing the heritage of Kansas.

The Kansas Historical Society website was launched in 1993, through the efforts of Steven Chinn and Lynn H. Nelson. The site originally was hosted at the University of Kansas. Several websites were built as part of the Kansas Heritage Group and included the Kansas Historical Society, Kansas Pioneers List, One-Room School House project, Johnson County Genealogical Society, Sunflower Journeys, Early Kansas Imprint Scanners, Historical Directory of Kansas Towns, the Kansas Humanities Council, Abilene Community Network, and the Kansas Community Network.

In 1998, the Historical Society began hosting its own site and the URL became www.kshs.org. The site has received numerous awards over the years.

== Kansas History ==
Kansas History
- Discipline: Western history, history of Kansas
- Language: English
- Edited by: Kristen Epps

Publication details
- History: 1978–present
- Publisher: Kansas Historical Foundation and the Kansas State University Department of History (United States)
- Frequency: Quarterly

Standard abbreviations
- ISO 4: Kans. Hist.

Indexing
- ISSN: 0149-9114
- LCCN: 78648409
- OCLC no.: 633924912

Links
- Journal homepage; Online archive

Kansas History: A Journal of the Central Plains is a quarterly peer-reviewed academic journal that is published by the Department of History at Kansas State University with financial support from the society. It is included with membership to the Kansas Historical Foundation.

The journal covers research on Kansas and western history. The editor-in-chief is Kristen Epps; former editors are James E. Sherow and Virgil W. Dean. The journal moved its offices to Kansas State University in 2013; prior to this date the editing and production process was headquartered at the Kansas Historical Society in Topeka.

In recent years, the journal has won academic awards. In 2019, an article by Jay Price titled "Assembling a Buckle of The Bible Belt: From Enclave to Powerhouse" won the Arrington-Prucha Prize from the Western History Association for the best article on religion in the American West. In 2021, David Beyreis's article "'Meat as a Matter of Form': Food, Exchange, and Power on the Santa Fe Trail" won the "Coke" Wood Award for best historical monograph or article, given by Westerners International.

Since its founding in 1875 the Kansas Historical Society has issued three major history journals: Kansas Historical Collections (1875–1928), The Kansas Historical Quarterly (1931–1977), and Kansas History: A Journal of the Central Plains (established in 1978).

This journal continues the academic journal entitled Kansas Historical Quarterly (ISSN 0022-8621, OCLC 1695105). It was established in 1931 and continued publication until 1977. The Kansas Historical Quarterly in turn continued Collections of the Kansas State Historical Society, and the society's other transactions, published by the Kansas State Historical Society from 1875 to 1928 (ISSN 0275-2700, OCLC 1755021).

== State Historic Sites ==
The Historical Society operates 16 state-owned historic sites throughout the state. Those sites are:

- Charles Curtis House State Historic Site, Topeka, Kansas
- Constitution Hall State Historic Site, Lecompton
- Cottonwood Ranch State Historic Site, Studley
- First Territorial Capitol State Historic Site, Fort Riley
- Fort Dodge Junior Officers Quarters State Historic Site, Fort Dodge, Kansas
- Fort Hays State Historic Site, Hays
- Goodnow House State Historic Site, Manhattan
- Grinter Place State Historic Site, Kansas City
- Hollenberg Pony Express Station State Historic Site, Hanover
- Iowa and Sac & Fox Mission State Historic Site, Highland
- John Brown Museum State Historic Site, Osawatomie
- Kaw Mission State Historic Site, Council Grove
- Marais des Cygnes Massacre State Historic Site, near Trading Post
- Mine Creek Battlefield State Historic Site, near Pleasanton
- Pawnee Indian Museum State Historic Site, Republic
- Pawnee Rock State Historic Site, Pawnee Rock
- Shawnee Indian Mission State Historic Site, Fairway
- William Allen White House State Historic Site, Emporia

== Register of Historic Kansas Places ==
The Society also established a state heritage register in 1977 called the Register of Historic Kansas Places. All Kansas listings on the National Register of Historic Places are automatically included but many additional sites are just on the state registry.

== Awards ==
The Kansas Historical Society has received several awards and honors from other organizations and associations related to the history profession:

- 1998: American Association for State and Local History
- 1999: Santa Fe Trail Association
- 2001: American Association for State and Local History
- 2001: American Association for State and Local History
- 2002: American Association for State and Local History
- 2002: American Association for State and Local History
- 2003: Travel Industry Association of Kansas
- 2004: American Association for State and Local History
- 2006: American Association for State and Local History
- 2006: American Association for State and Local History
- 2007: Family Tree Magazine Award
- 2008: American Association for State and Local History
- 2008: American Association for State and Local History
- 2008: Western Writer's Association of America
- 2009: Oregon-California Trail Association
- 2011: United States Department of the Interior Partners in Conservation Award

== See also ==
- The Kansas Historical Quarterly (1931–1977)
- Kansas History: A Journal of the Central Plains (1978–present)
- List of historical societies in Kansas
