= Loring Miner =

American physician (1860–1935)

- Born: 1860; Kansas
- Died: 30 September 1935 (aged 74–75); Kansas
- Education: Ohio University

Loring Vinton Miner (1860–1935) was an American physician who is most notable for being the first in the world to identify and describe the Spanish flu.

== Early life and education ==
Loring Miner was born in 1860 in Kansas.

He graduated from Ohio University. He received his M.D. from Columbus Medical College, in 1886.

He was also self taught in ancient Greek and could easily read classics in the original language.

== Career ==
He began his medical practice in Haskell County, Kansas in 1885. Although he owned one of the first automobiles in this rural area, he relied on a horse and buggy to make house calls at farms and villages throughout the county.

In addition to being a physician, he also served as the county's coroner for a time, as well as county health officer and as a chair in the county's chapter of the Democratic Party. He also owned a grocery store and drugstore.

== Spanish flu ==
In 1918, he became the first person in the United States to report the outbreak of the Spanish flu to the US Health Service. Following the severe illness and death of an elderly woman patient, his practice was besieged with numerous patients, including young and formerly healthy people, suffering with similar symptoms.

Due to the efforts of Loring Miner, it has been theorized that the Spanish flu originated in Kansas.

== Death ==
He died in an automobile crash in Sublette, Kansas, on 30 September 1935. He is buried in the Valley View Cemetery, Garden City, Kansas.
