= Fort Riley =

Army installation in Kansas, US

- eponym: MG Bennet C. Riley, USA
- Riley / Geary counties, near Junction City, Kansas
- Shoulder sleeve insignia of First Infantry Division

Site information
- Type: Army post
- Controlled by: United States Army
- Status: Active
- Website: Official website

Location
- Location of Fort Riley Fort Riley (the United States)
- Coordinates: 39°06′N 96°49′W
- Area: 101,733 acres (159.0 sq mi; 411.7 km^{2})

Site history
- Built: January 1853
- In use: 1853–present

Garrison information
- Current commander: Colonel Gerald Nunziato
- Garrison: 1st Infantry Division

Fort Riley is a United States Army installation located in North Central Kansas, on the Kansas River, also known as the Kaw, between Junction City and Manhattan. The Fort Riley Military Reservation covers 101,733 acres (41,170 ha) in Geary and Riley counties. The Fort consists of six functional areas, including the Main Post, Camp Funston, Marshall Army Airfield (MAAF), Camp Whitside, Camp Forsyth, and Custer Hill. The portion of the fort that contains housing development is part of the Fort Riley census-designated place, with a residential population of 9,230 as of the 2020 census. The ZIP Code is 66442.

== Stationed units ==
1st Infantry Division

- Headquarters and Headquarters Battalion, 1st Infantry Division
- 1st Brigade Combat Team, 1st Infantry Division
- 2nd Brigade Combat Team, 1st Infantry Division
- 1st Infantry Division Artillery (DIVARTY)
- Combat Aviation Brigade, 1st Infantry Division
- 1st Infantry Division Sustainment Brigade

Garrison

- 97th Military Police Battalion
- Headquarters and Headquarters Company, U.S. Army Garrison

Partners:

- 10th Air Support Operations Squadron, USAF
- 407th Army Field Support Brigade
- 902nd Military Intelligence Group
- Detachment 2, 3d Weather Squadron, USAF
- Danger Voice Signal University
- Irwin Army Community Hospital
- Warrior Transition Battalion
- 79th Ordnance Battalion (Explosive Ordnance Disposal)
- 923rd Contracting Battalion
- Department of the Army Criminal Investigation Division (CID), Fort Riley Resident Agency

Inactivated:

- 1st Signal Command, inactivated in 1969
- 121st Signal Battalion, inactivated 1995

== History ==
=== Origins ===
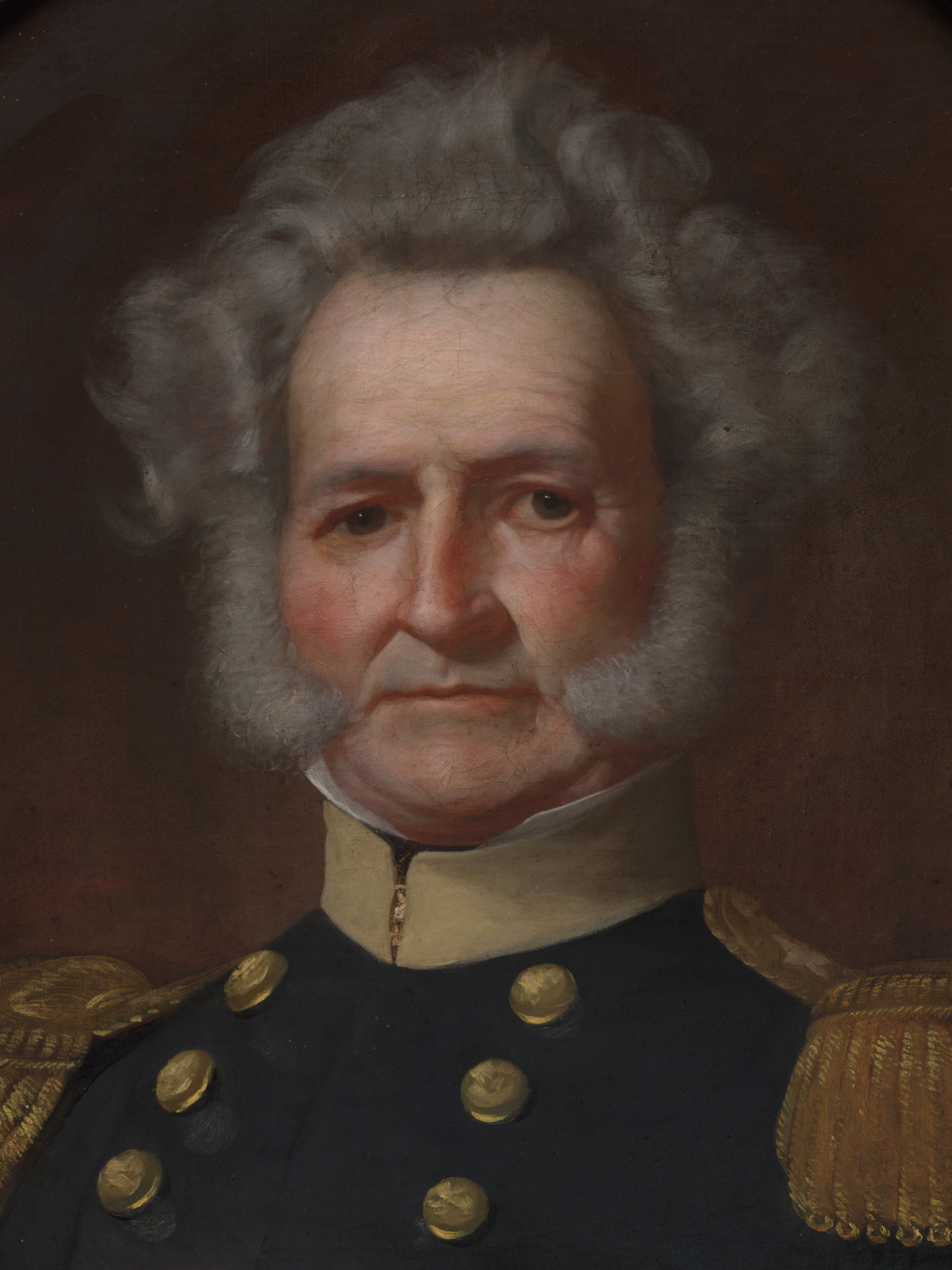
Bennet C. Riley, the namesake of Fort Riley

The early history of Fort Riley is closely tied to the movement of people and trade along the Oregon Trail and Santa Fe Trail. These routes, a result of the then-popular United States doctrine of "manifest destiny" in the middle of the 19th century, prompted increased American military presence for the protection of American interests in this largely unsettled territory. In the 1850s, the United States established several military posts at strategic points to safeguard these emigration and commerce routes.

In the fall of 1852, a surveying party under the command of Captain Robert H. Chilton, 1st U.S. Dragoons, selected the junction of the Republican and Smoky Hill Rivers as a site for one of these forts. This location, approved by the War Department in January 1853, offered an advantageous location from which to organize, train, and equip troops to protect the overland trails. The site was named Camp Center because surveyors believed it was near the center of the United States. In late spring, three companies of the 6th Infantry occupied the camp and began construction of temporary quarters.

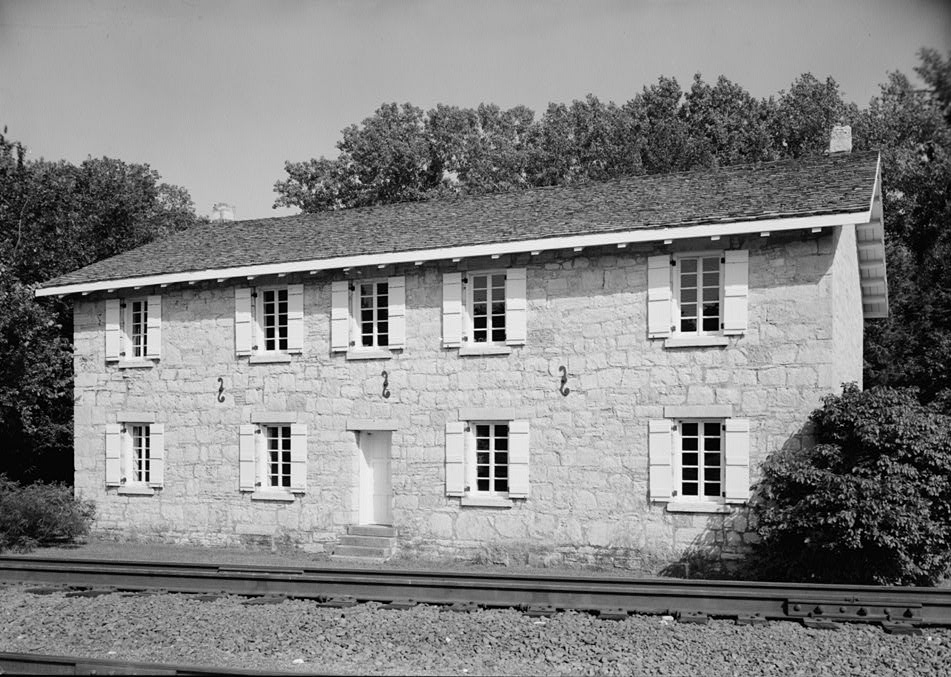
The First Territorial Capitol of Kansas was built in 1855 at present-day Fort Riley.

On June 27, 1853, Camp Center became Fort Riley — named in honor of Major General Bennet C. Riley, who had led the first military escort along the Santa Fe Trail in 1829. The "fort" took shape around a broad plain that overlooked the Kansas River valley. The fort's design followed the standard frontier post configuration: buildings were constructed of the most readily available material — in this case, native limestone. In the spring, troops were dispatched to escort mail trains and protect travel routes across the plains. At the fort, additional buildings were constructed under the supervision of Capt. Edmund Ogden. Anticipating greater utilization of the post, Congress authorized appropriations in the spring of 1855 to provide additional quarters and stables for the Dragoons. Ogden again marshaled resources and arrived from Leavenworth in July with 50 6-mule teams loaded with materials, craftsmen, and laborers.

Work had progressed for several weeks when cholera broke out among the workers. The epidemic lasted only a few days but claimed 70 lives, including Ogden's. Work gradually resumed, and buildings were prepared for the arrival in October of the 2nd Dragoons. As the fort began to take shape, an issue soon to dominate the national scene was debated during the brief territorial legislative session that met at Pawnee in the present area of Camp Whitside, named for Colonel Warren Whitside. The first territorial legislature met there in July 1855. Slavery was a fact of life and an issue within the garrison just as it was in the rest of the country. The seeds of sectional discord were emerging that would lead to "Bleeding Kansas" and, eventually, Civil War.

=== Bleeding Kansas and the Civil War ===
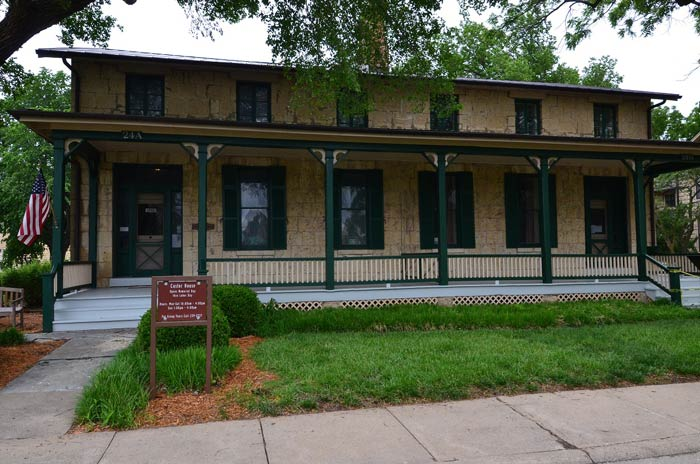
Built in 1855, Fort Riley's Custer Home represents the architecture and style of a military home on the base during the Civil War era.

Increased tension and bloodshed between pro- and anti-slavery settlers led to the Army being used to "police" the troubled territory. They also continued to guard and patrol the Santa Fe Trail in 1859 and 1860 due to increased Indian threats. The outbreak of hostilities between the North and South in 1861 disrupted garrison life. Regular units returned east to participate in the Civil War, while militia units from Kansas and other states used Riley as a base from which to launch campaigns to show the flag and offer a degree of protection to trading caravans using the Santa Fe Trail.

In the early stages of the war, the fort was used to house Confederate prisoners. In early 1862, the fort served as a temporary detention facility for 133 Confederate prisoners from Texas, who had been captured during the New Mexico campaign. The prisoners remained at Fort Riley for approximately one month before being transferred to Fort Leavenworth. During their stay, seven individuals died due to illness or injuries sustained in battle and were interred in the vicinity. In May 1863, Fort Riley again held Confederate prisoners, this time those captured following raids in the Council Grove, Kansas, region. However, the overall involvement of Fort Riley in the Civil War was relatively limited.

=== Post-Civil War and the Custer Era ===
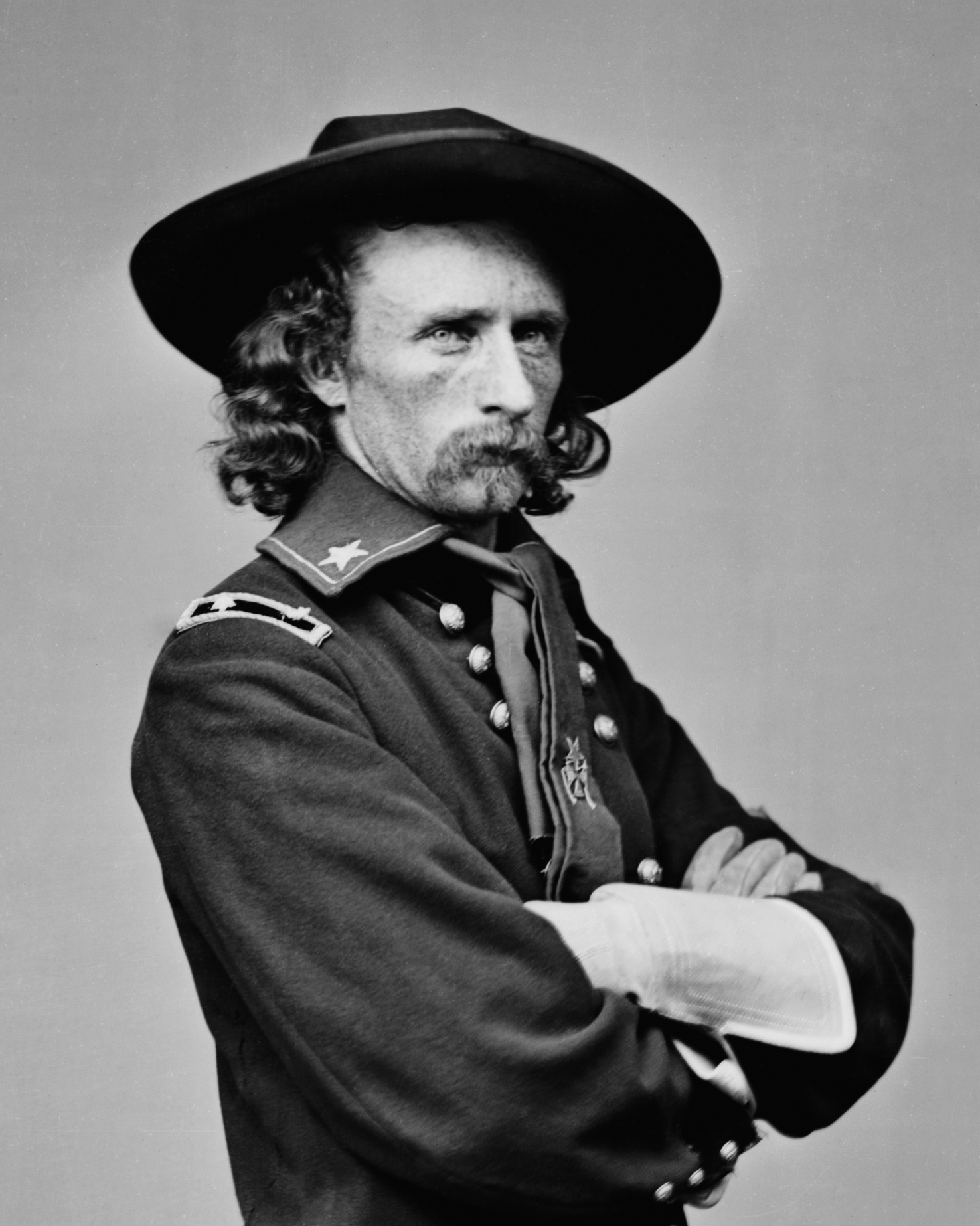
George A. Custer

The conclusion of the Civil War in 1865 saw Fort Riley again assume an important role in providing protection to railroad lines being built across Kansas. The summer and fall of 1866 witnessed the mustering in of the 7th Cavalry Regiment at Riley and the arrival of the Union Pacific Railroad at the fort. In December, Brevet Major General George A. Custer arrived to take charge of the new regiment. Soldiers from the Kansas Volunteer regiments that were wounded in the Battle of Westport were brought to Fort Riley for recovery.

The following spring, Custer and the 7th left Fort Riley to participate in a campaign on the high plains of western Kansas and eastern Colorado. The campaign proved inconclusive but resulted in Custer's court martial and suspension from the Army for one year—in part—for returning to Fort Riley to see his wife without permission. As the line of settlement extended westward each spring, the fort lost some of its importance. Larger concentrations of troops were stationed at Fort Larned and Fort Hays, where they spent the summer months on patrol and wintered in garrison.

Between 1869 and 1871, a school of light artillery was conducted at Fort Riley by the 4th Artillery Battery. Instruction was of a purely practical nature, and regular classes were not conducted. Critiques were delivered during or following the exercise. This short-lived school closed in March 1871 as the War Department imposed economic measures, which included cutting a private's monthly pay from $12 to $9.

During the next decade, various regiments of the infantry and cavalry were garrisoned at Riley. The spring and summer months usually witnessed a skeletal complement at the fort while the remainder of the troops were sent to Forts Hays, Wallace, and Dodge in western Kansas. With the approach of winter, these troops returned to Riley. Regiments serving here during this time included the 5th, 6th, and 9th Cavalry and the 16th Infantry Regiment. The lessening of hostilities with the Indian tribes of the Great Plains resulted in the closing of many frontier forts. Riley escaped this fate when Lt. Gen. Philip Sheridan recommended in his 1884 annual report to Congress to make the fort "Cavalry Headquarters of the Army".

=== Cavalry School and Modernization ===
General P. H. Sheridan, who was appointed general-in-chief of the United States army in 1883, recommended the enlargement of the post, and in 1886 the Kansas legislature adopted a resolution requesting the senators and representatives in Congress from that state to use their power and influence to secure an appropriation to carry out the ideas of the commanding general. Senators Preston B. Plumb and John J. Ingalls and Representative John A. Anderson, who represented the district in which Fort Riley was located, were especially active in behalf of the appropriation. The result of the combined efforts of the friends of the post was that in 1887 an appropriation of $200,000 was made by Congress for the purpose of establishing "a permanent school of instruction for drill and practice for the cavalry and light artillery service of the army of the United States, and which shall be the depot to which all recruits for such service shall be sent; and for the purpose of construction of such quarters, barracks and stables as may be required to carry into effect the purposes of this act", which would become the United States Army Cavalry School. That appropriation was the beginning of a series of improvements that amount practically to the rebuilding of the post, including a large cavalry riding hall.

In 1889, Summerall Hall was constructed as the second permanent hospital at Fort Riley and was later converted into the garrison command headquarters following the hospital's relocation. It was renamed in 1956 in honor of General Charles P. Summerall, who commanded the 1st Infantry Division during the late 1910s to early 1920s.

Fort Riley was also used by state militia units for encampments and training exercises. The first such maneuver occurred in the fall of 1902, with subsequent ones held in 1903, 1904, 1906–1908, and 1911. These exercises gave added importance to the fort as a training facility and provided reserve units a valuable opportunity for sharpening their tactical skills. Army horsemen and the training they received at the United States Army Cavalry School made them among the finest mounted soldiers in the world, and the school's reputation ranked with the French and Italian Cavalry Schools. Horse shows, hunts, and polo matches – long popular events on Army post – were a natural outgrowth of cavalry training.

=== Buffalo Soldiers ===
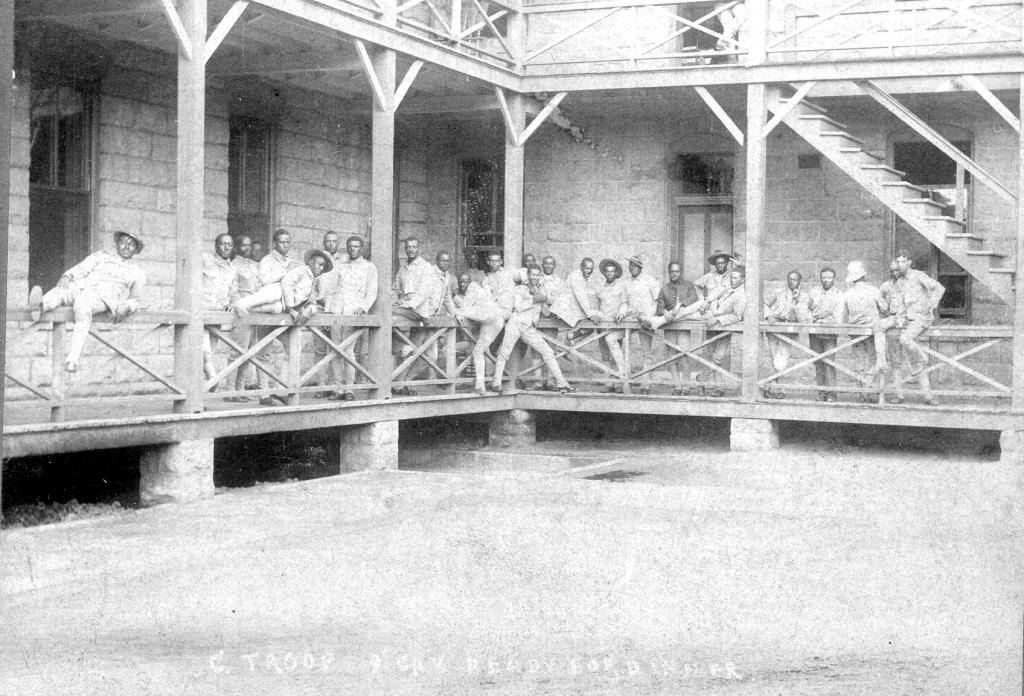
Buffalo soldiers pose outside of their barracks.

The 9th and 10th Cavalry Regiments — the famed "Buffalo Soldiers," so called by the indigenous peoples for the similarity to the short, curly-haired buffalo that roamed the plains — were stationed at Fort Riley several times during their history. Shortly after their formation in 1866, the 9th Cavalry passed through en route to permanent stations in the southwest. They returned during the early 1880s and the early part of the 20th century before being permanently assigned as troop cadre for the Cavalry School during the 1920s and 1930s. The 10th Cavalry was stationed here in 1868 and 1913. On the eve of World War II, the 9th and 10th Cavalry joined the 2nd Cavalry Division, which was briefly stationed at Fort Riley.

=== World War I ===
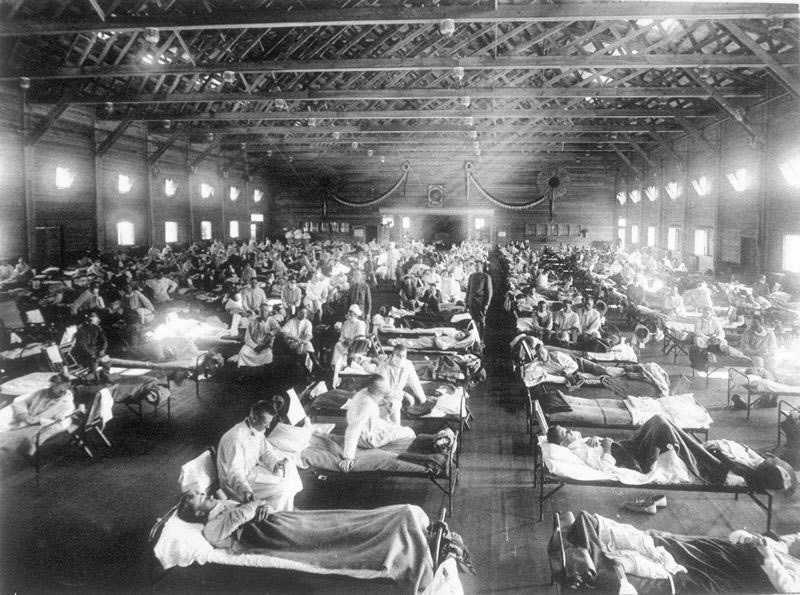
Soldiers from Fort Riley ill with Spanish influenza at a hospital ward at Camp Funston, Kansas, in 1918.

America's entry into World War I resulted in many changes at Fort Riley. Facilities were greatly expanded, and a cantonment named Camp Funston was built 5 miles (8 km) east of the permanent post during the summer and fall of 1917. This training site was one of 16 across the country and could accommodate from 30,000 to 50,000 men.

The first division to train at Camp Funston, the 89th, sailed for France in the spring of 1918. The 10th Division also received training at Funston, but the armistice came before the unit was sent overseas. The camp was commanded by Major General Leonard Wood. A Military Officers Training Camp was established in the Camp Whitside area to train doctors and other medical personnel.

==== Spanish flu ====
The earliest suspected cases of what would later believed to be the Spanish flu were reported in Haskell County, Kansas in January and February 1918. Local physician Loring Miner observed an unusually severe outbreak of influenza and alerted the editors of the U.S. Public Health Service's academic journal Public Health Reports. Several men from Haskell County who may have been exposed to influenza then traveled to Camp Funston at Fort Riley in the following weeks.

Shortly after their arrival at Camp Funston, on either March 4 or March 11, 1918 (depending on the account), an army cook named Albert Gitchell reported sick to the infirmary with flu-like symptoms in the morning before breakfast. By midday, 107 soldiers at the camp exhibited similar symptoms, and within days, 522 men had fallen ill. This outbreak at Fort Riley was later hypothesized to be the starting point of the Spanish flu pandemic.

=== Interwar years ===
Following the war, the War Department directed service schools be created for all arms of service. As a result, in 1919, the Mounted Service School, as it was known since 1907 and which had ceased to function during the war, was re-designated as the United States Army Cavalry School. The change was sudden and abrupt. The new school met the need for courses both broader in scope and more general in character. The cavalry unit at Camp Funston was the 2nd cavalry regiment, which provided the training and cavalry tactics to new cavalry officers.

The Cavalry School Hunt was officially organized in 1921 and provided a colorful spectacle on Sunday mornings. These activities gave rise to the perception of a special quality of life at Fort Riley that came to be known as the "Life of Riley." The technological advances demonstrated on the battlefields of Europe and World War I – most notable the tank and machine gun – raised questions in the interwar years over the future of cavalry. By the late 1920s, the Army's War Department had directed the development of a tank force. This was followed by activation of the 7th Cavalry Brigade (Mechanized) at Fort Knox, Kentucky, in the fall of 1936 to make up the 2nd Regiment of this brigade. In October 1938, the 7th Cavalry Brigade (Mech.) marched from Fort Knox to Fort Riley and participated in large-scale combine maneuvers of horse and mechanized units. These exercises helped prove the effectiveness of mechanical doctrine.

==== Marshall Army Airfield ====
Initial experiments in directing artillery fire from an aircraft were undertaken at Fort Riley in 1912, with participants including H. H. Arnold, who later became a significant figure in the United States Army Air Forces. In 1921, the Smoky Hill Flats portion of the fort was designated as the location for a new airfield, initially referred to as Fort Riley Flying Field. The new airfield commenced operations in August of that year and served as the base for the 16th Observation Squadron. Built primarily as a refueling station for cross-country flights, the airfield featured metal hangars, underground fuel storage tanks, and lighting for night operations. Following the completion of the facility in 1923, the airfield was renamed Marshall Army Airfield in honor of Brigadier General Francis C. Marshall, who was killed in a plane crash the year before. Throughout the 1920s and 1930s, Marshall Army Airfield's primary role was to support aircraft engaged in observation and photography during tactical exercises at Fort Riley, as well as to host aerial demonstrations, with no known aircraft training activities occurring during this period.

=== World War II ===
A soldier sighting an M116 howitzer during artillery practice at Fort Riley in 1942.

Increasing conflict in Europe and Asia during the late 1930s caused some military planners to prepare for possible U. S. involvement. This led to several important developments at Fort Riley. The first was the rebuilding of Camp Funston and the stationing of the 2nd Cavalry Division there in December 1940. Barracks were built in the area known as Republican Flats and renamed Camp Forsyth. In addition, 32,000 acres (13,000 ha) were added to the post for training purposes. These efforts were brought into sharp focus with America's entry into World War II. Over the next four years, approximately 125,000 soldiers were trained at these facilities. Notable trainees included heavyweight boxing champion, Joe Louis, Indy car driver Walt Faulkner, and motion picture stars such as Mickey Rooney. The post also received a presidential visit by Franklin Roosevelt on Easter Sunday 1943.

The 9th Armored Division was organized here in July 1942, and after its deployment, Camp Funston was used as a German prisoner of war camp. Fort Riley had branch POW camps, a large branch Camp Phillips in Salina, and 12 smaller branch camps in Kansas and Missouri: Council Grove, El Dorado, Eskridge, Hutchinson, Lawrence, Neodesha, Ottawa, Peabody, Wadsworth, Grand Pass, Lexington, and Liberty.

The arrival of victory in Europe and Japan during the spring and summer of 1945 were joyous occasions, but they also spelled new realities and directions for the Army and Fort Riley.

=== Korean War ===
In the aftermath of World War II, the fort experienced a period of transition. The Cavalry School ceased operation in November 1946, and the last tactical horse unit inactivated the following March. Replacing the Cavalry School was the Ground General School, which trained newly commissioned officers in basic military subjects. An officer's candidate course was conducted along with training officers and enlisted men in intelligence techniques and methods. The 10th Mountain Division was activated July 1, 1948, at Fort Riley, Kansas. The 16-week basic military program conducted by this division prepared soldiers for infantry combat and duty with other infantry units.

The invasion of South Korea by North Korean forces in June 1950 once again brought attention to Fort Riley as an important training facility. Over the next few years, recruits from all over the United States came to Fort Riley and received basic training. During the conflict, units from the Ohio National Guard also stationed the 37th Infantry Division at the fort. While they were not sent overseas, their presence was a continuing reinforcement of the fort's importance as a training post.

=== Cold War ===
The uneasy truce that settled on the Korean peninsula after 1953 was indicative of a cold war that had come to characterize relations between the United States and the Soviet Union. This would affect Fort Riley.

In 1955, the fort's utilization changed from training and educational center to that of being the home base for a major infantry division. In that year, the 10th Division rotated to Germany as part of Operation Gyroscope and was replaced by the 1st Infantry Division. Elements of the Big Red One began arriving in July 1955, and over the next four years the remaining units arrived, the last being the 2nd Battle Group, 8th Infantry, in December 1959. The initial units occupied barracks located in Camp Funston, until new barracks were built on Custer Hill. Ultimately, the 1st Battle Group, 5th Infantry, would be stationed at Funston, with the other units of the division divided between Custer Hill, Forsythe, and Main Post.

The influx of troops and dependents placed new demands on the fort's infrastructure. Work began on Custer Hill, where new quarters, barracks, and work areas were constructed. A new hospital, named in honor of Major General B. J. D. Irwin, was constructed to provide medical care.

In the decade following, 1st Infantry Division units trained to respond to any threat that might arise in Europe or other parts of the world. Construction of the Berlin Wall in 1961 and the Cuban Missile Crisis the following year witnessed heightened alert for soldiers stationed at Fort Riley.

An additional 50,000 acres (20,000 ha) were also acquired in 1966, which enabled the Army to have an adequate training area for the division's two brigades.

==== Operation Long Thrust ====
Consistent with President Kennedy's August 1961 directive to augment the U.S. Berlin Brigade, in 1962–1963 1st Infantry Division rotated four Infantry Battle Group Task Forces (reinforced by Big Red One Artillery and Transportation units) from Fort Riley to West Germany, from where they motor marched through communist East Germany to surround West Berlin. 1st Division units involved were 2nd Battle Group, 12th Infantry; 1st Battle Group, 13th Infantry; 1st Battle Group, 28th Infantry; & 2nd Battle Group, 26th Infantry. 2/12th was in Berlin during the Cuban Missile Crisis. 1/28th greeted President Kennedy on June 26, 1963, the day of his memorable "Ich bin ein Berliner" speech.

=== Vietnam ===
Increased guerrilla insurgency in South Vietnam during the mid-1960s, led to the deployment of the 1st Infantry Division to Southeast Asia. The leading element, the 1st Battalion, 18th Infantry, left in July 1965, with the Division Headquarters arriving in South Vietnam in September. During this same year, a provisional basic combat training brigade was organized at Fort Riley, and in February 1966, the 9th Infantry Division was reactivated and followed the 1st Infantry Division into combat.

Fort Riley's use as a divisional post was maintained with the arrival of the 24th Infantry Division. The division remained in Germany until September 1968, when it redeployed two brigades to Fort Riley as part of the REFORGER (Return of Forces to Germany) program. One brigade was maintained in Germany. Following nearly five years of combat in Vietnam, the 1st Infantry Division returned to Fort Riley in April 1970 and assumed the NATO commitment. The division's 3rd Brigade was stationed in West Germany. During the 1970s and the 1980s, 1st Infantry Division soldiers were periodically deployed on REFORGER exercises.

Reserve Officer Training Corps summer camps were also held at the fort, which permitted troops to demonstrate and teach their skills to aspiring second lieutenants. The fort also hosted the model U.S. Army Correctional Brigade, housed in Camp Funston, and the 3rd ROTC Region Headquarters until their inactivation in 1992.

=== The Gulf War ===
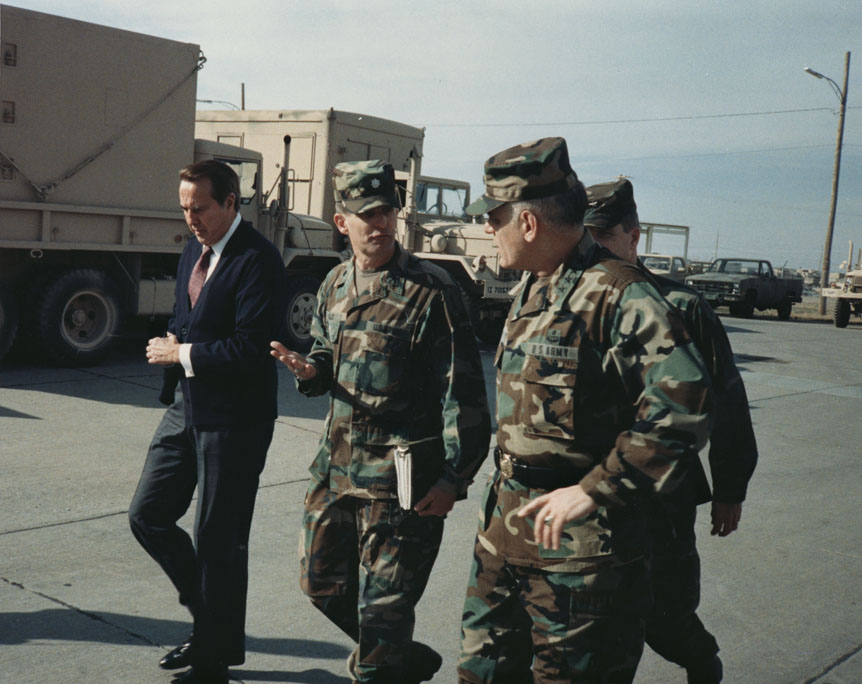
US Senator Bob Dole visiting Fort Riley in December 1990.

In August 1990, Iraq invaded its neighbor, Kuwait. The resulting international outcry led to the largest U.S. troop build-up and deployment overseas since the Vietnam War. In the fall of that year, Fort Riley was notified to begin mobilization of troops and equipment for deployment to the Persian Gulf. Between November 1990 and January 1991, soldiers and equipment were deployed overseas.

In addition to the 1st Infantry Division, 27 non-divisional units were deployed, and twenty-four reserve components were mobilized. This amounted to 15,180 soldiers being sent overseas via 115 aircraft. Over 2,000 rail cars transported 3,000 short tons of equipment, which were then shipped to theater on 18 vessels.

Once in theater, the soldiers and equipment were prepared for combat. This commenced in late February 1991, and over the course of the "hundred hours" combat of Operation Desert Storm, these soldiers carried out their orders and executed their missions that resulted in the crushing of Saddam Hussein's Republican Guards. Later that spring, the soldiers returned to Fort Riley.

=== The 1990s and beyond ===
Following Operation Desert Storm, the 1st Infantry Division returned to Fort Riley. However, the winds of change were once again blowing across the Army, affecting the post. With the crumbling of the Iron Curtain, new realities in Eastern Europe were replacing the Cold War of the past four decades. Budget cuts and revised strategic thinking resulted in troop cutbacks.

In the spring of 1995, the headquarters of the 1st Infantry Division were transferred from Fort Riley to Germany. The 1st Brigade of the Big Red One remained at the post, along with the 3rd Brigade, 1st Armored Division, and the 937th Engineer Group.

Fort Riley once again became a Division Headquarters on June 5, 1999, with the reactivation of the 24th Infantry Division (Mechanized). The 24th Infantry Division (Mech.) is the headquarters for three enhanced Separate Brigades (eSBs) of the Army National Guard. Under the integrated Active Component/Reserve Component concept, the 24th Infantry Division (Mech.) consists of an active component headquarters at Fort Riley and three enhanced Separate Brigades: the 30th Heavy Separate Brigade at Clinton, North Carolina, the 218th Heavy Separate Brigade at Columbia, South Carolina, and the 48th Separate Infantry Brigade in Macon, Georgia. These units underwent eight-year training cycles, culminating in a rotation at the National Training Center. They also backfill active duty units for Major Theater War contingencies and supply units for Stabilization Force rotations in Bosnia.

On June 1, 2006, Fort Riley began training Military Transition Teams, or MiTTs. These 10-15 man teams from across the Army, Navy, and Air Force train at Fort Riley's Camp Funston for 60 days. The focus of the transition team training was to prepare teams to train, mentor, and advise Iraqi and Afghan security forces. Training is based on core competencies—combat skills, force protection, team support processes, technical and tactical training, adviser skills, counter-insurgency operations, and understanding the culture.

==== Return of the 1st Infantry Division ====
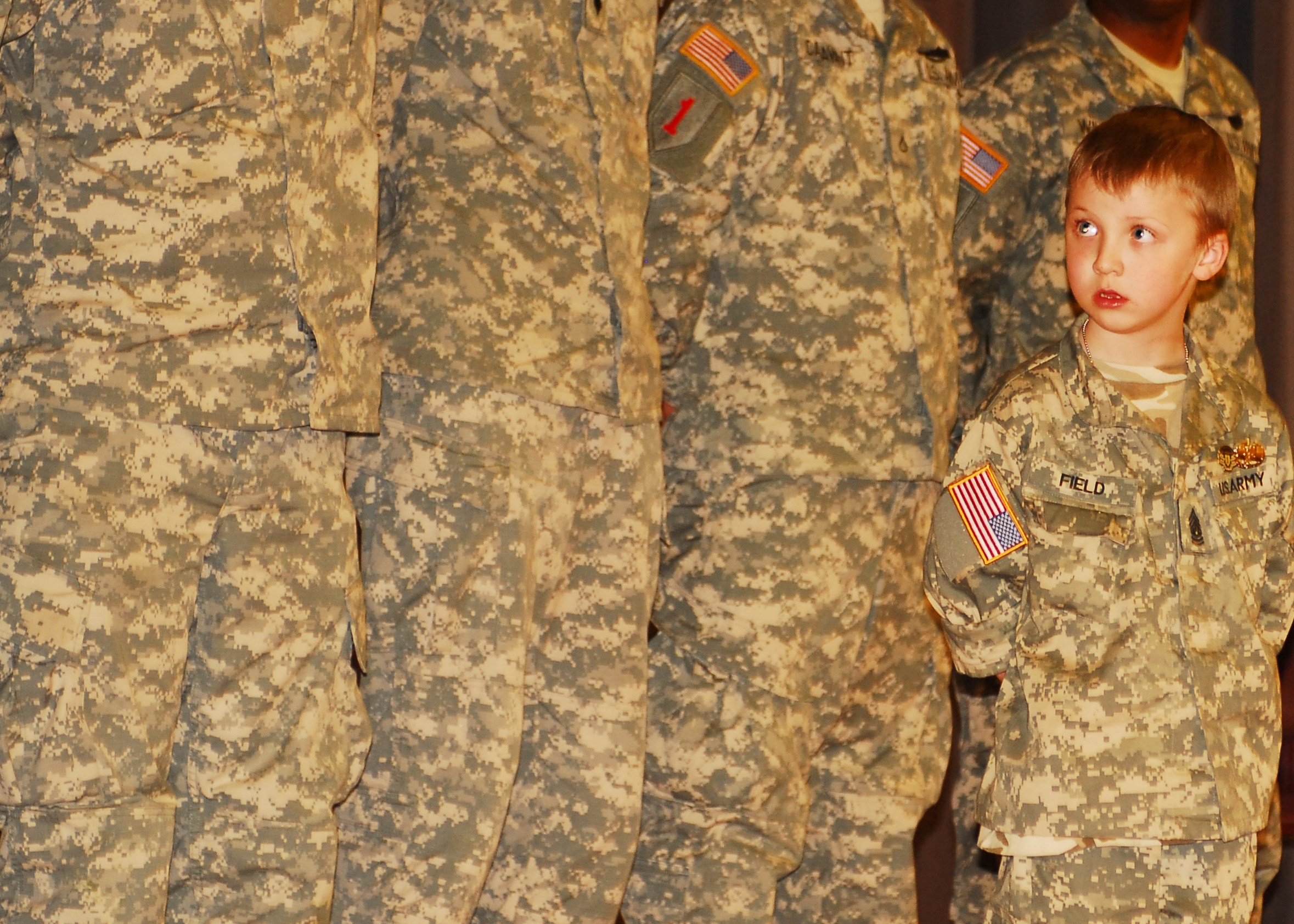
Ian Field, 7, stands with his squad during a farewell award ceremony April 15, 2011, at Barlow Theater on Fort Riley. The Soldiers of the 1st Infantry Division worked with the Make-A-Wish Foundation to grant Ian's wish to become a soldier

On August 1, 2006, the 1st Infantry Division returned to Fort Riley, and the 24th Infantry Division was inactivated.

In October 2006, the 1st Brigade, 1st Infantry Division, assumed command and control of the Military Transition Team training mission. The entire division took the lead on this mission for the military. The mission was moved from Fort Riley to Fort Polk, LA, in the summer of 2009.

== Facilities ==
=== Education ===
Fort Riley offers educational services for service members and their dependents, including early childhood education, schools, and higher education.

Four Child Development Centers (CDCs) on the base provide care for children aged 6 weeks to 5 years: First Division CDC, Forsyth CDC, Warren CDC, and Whitside CDC. For primary education, students attend several elementary schools on base operated by the Geary County Unified School District 475, including Ware Elementary, Jefferson Elementary, Seitz Elementary, Fort Riley Elementary, and Morris Hill Elementary. Students in grades six through eight typically attend Fort Riley Middle School and then proceed to either Manhattan High School or Junction City High School.

Fort Riley hosts several colleges and universities with satellite campuses on base, including Barton Community College, Hutchinson Community College, Central Texas College, Upper Iowa University, Kansas State University, Central Michigan University, Southwestern College, and the University of Mary. Kansas State University's main campus is located in nearby Manhattan, Kansas, providing additional educational opportunities for those who reside on base.

=== Irwin Army Hospital ===
A year after the post was established in 1853, a temporary hospital was constructed near the present-day Post/Cavalry Museum and Patton Hall on the main post. A permanent hospital, which is now the Post/Cavalry Museum, was built in 1855 with a clock tower added in 1890. The second hospital, later known as Summerall Hall, replaced the 1855 hospital in 1888 and is now Post Headquarters. A third hospital was built in 1941 at Camp Whitside and named Cantonment Hospital, later Station Hospital. The second hospital remained as an annex until 1957. The fourth hospital (now known as the "Legacy Hospital") was dedicated in 1958, and a new facility on the site of the previous Station Hospital opened in 2016. The Legacy and current hospitals were named after Brigadier General Bernard John Dowling Irwin, "The Fighting Doctor", who won the Medal of Honor for distinguished gallantry in action during an engagement with the Chiricahua Indians near Apache Pass, Arizona Territory, in February 1861. As of 2016, the hospital has 47 beds and is staffed by 45 physicians.

=== Museums ===
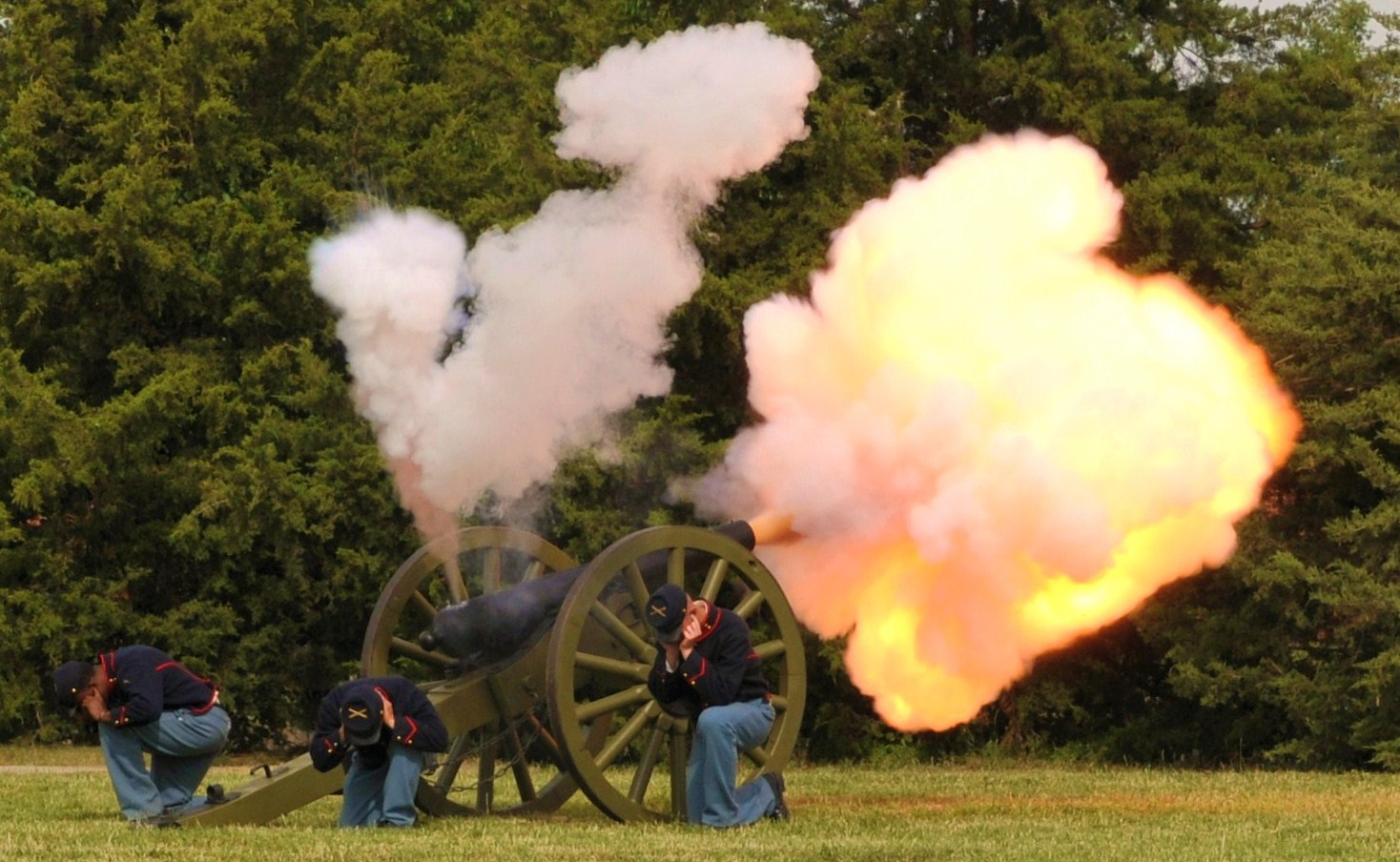
7th Field Artillerymen fire "Old Glory", a replica of a Civil War field piece, at a 2012 ceremony at Fort Riley.

- U.S. Cavalry Museum — housed in the building used as headquarters by George A. Custer, the museum houses exhibits about the United States Cavalry from the Revolutionary War to 1950.
- 1st Infantry Division Museum — exhibits relating to the 1st Infantry Division from 1917 to the present and the United States Constabulary forces that served in Germany immediately following World War II
- Custer Home, 24 Sheridan Avenue — Historic house museum
- First Territorial Capitol of Kansas — History of Territorial Kansas
- M65 atomic cannon, on the hills overlooking Marshall Airfield in Freedom Park

== Environmental contamination ==
The Fort Riley site has contaminated groundwater stemming from years of improper waste disposal. Wastes at the site include pesticides, vinyl chloride, solvents, perchloroethylene (PCE) and other volatile organic compounds. The United States Environmental Protection Agency listed Fort Riley as a Superfund site in 1990. Major cleanup activities at the site took place in the 1990s, while environmental monitoring of the site continues as of 2017.

== Notable people ==
- Barbara Babcock, actress born in Fort Riley
- Frank Buckles, last surviving American World War One veteran that was stationed at Fort Riley before getting deployed to Europe
- Enos Cabell, former third baseman and first baseman in Major League Baseball, played for the Baltimore Orioles, Houston Astros, San Francisco Giants, Detroit Tigers, and the Los Angeles Dodgers was born in Fort Riley
- George A. Custer, Army General that was once stationed at Fort Riley
- Johnny Damon, professional baseball player born in Fort Riley
- Chris Faust, landscape photographer
- Wallace Ford, Hollywood actor, was stationed at the Fort during World War I
- Clara Lanza, author born in Fort Riley
- Timothy McVeigh, perpetrator of the 1995 Oklahoma City bombing was once stationed at Fort Riley
- Milton C. Portmann Professional football player. WWI Army Officer 89th Division stationed before deployment.
- Robert K. Preston, stole a helicopter and landed it on the South Lawn of the White House in 1974 and was once stationed at Fort Riley
- Daisy Maude Orleman Robinson, World War I doctor, first woman dermatologist in the United States was born in Fort Riley
- Jackie Robinson, first African-American to play in Major League Baseball, former second baseman for the Brooklyn Dodgers was once stationed at the Fort
- John A. Seitz, U.S. Army general is buried in the Fort Riley Cemetery
- Dave Wallace, member of the Arkansas House of Representatives for Mississippi County; decorated Army veteran of the Vietnam War; formerly stationed at Fort Riley
- Pi'erre Bourne, rapper, singer and record producer born in Fort Riley
