= Presidency of Franklin Pierce =

U.S. presidential administration from 1853 to 1857

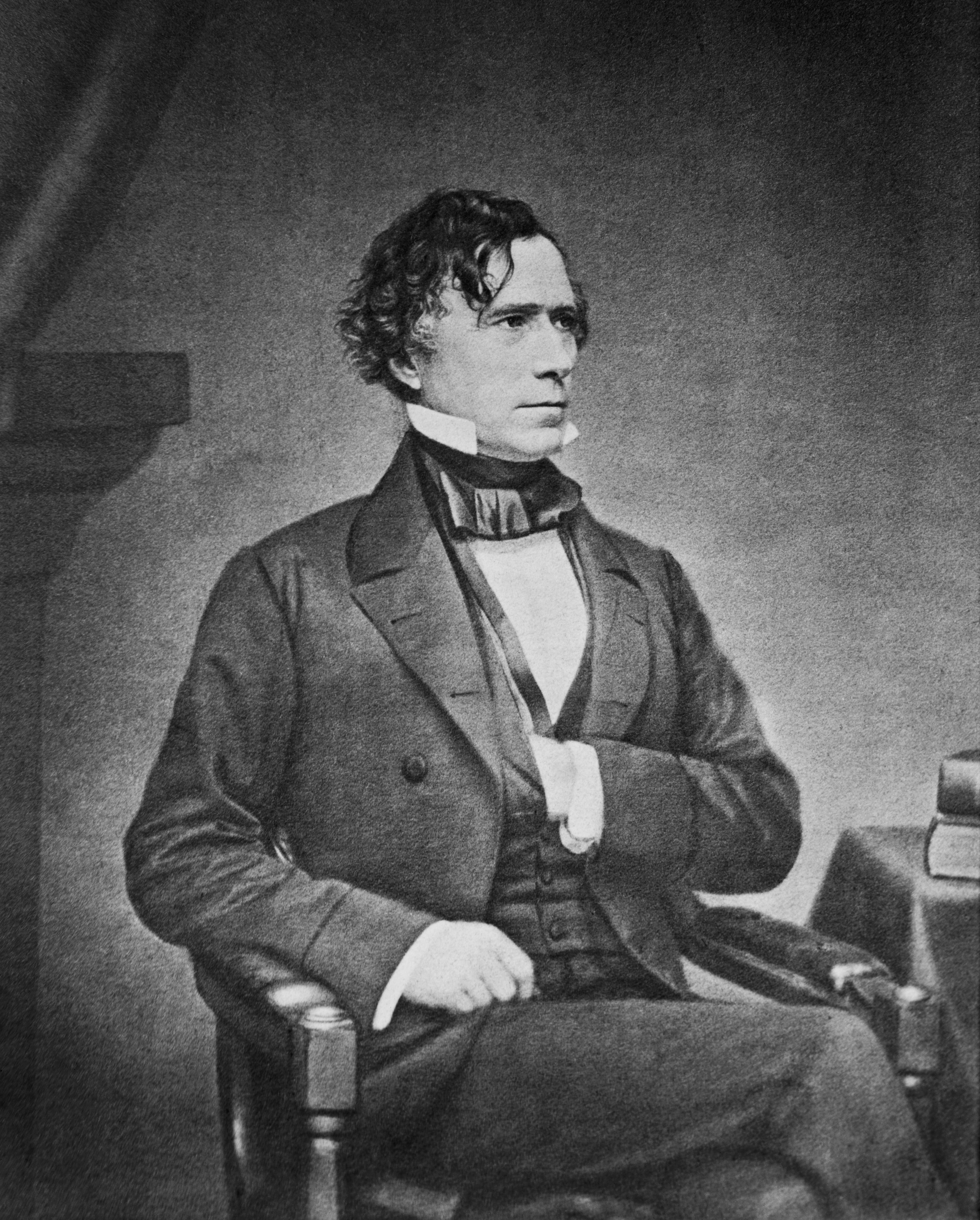
- Presidency of Franklin Pierce; March 4, 1853 – March 4, 1857
- Vice President: William R. King (March–April 1853); None (1853–1857) (Note: Vice President King died in office. As this was prior to the adoption of the Twenty-fifth Amendment in 1967, a vacancy in the office of vice president was not filled until the next ensuing election and inauguration.)
- Cabinet: See list
- Party: Democratic
- Election: 1852
- Seat: White House
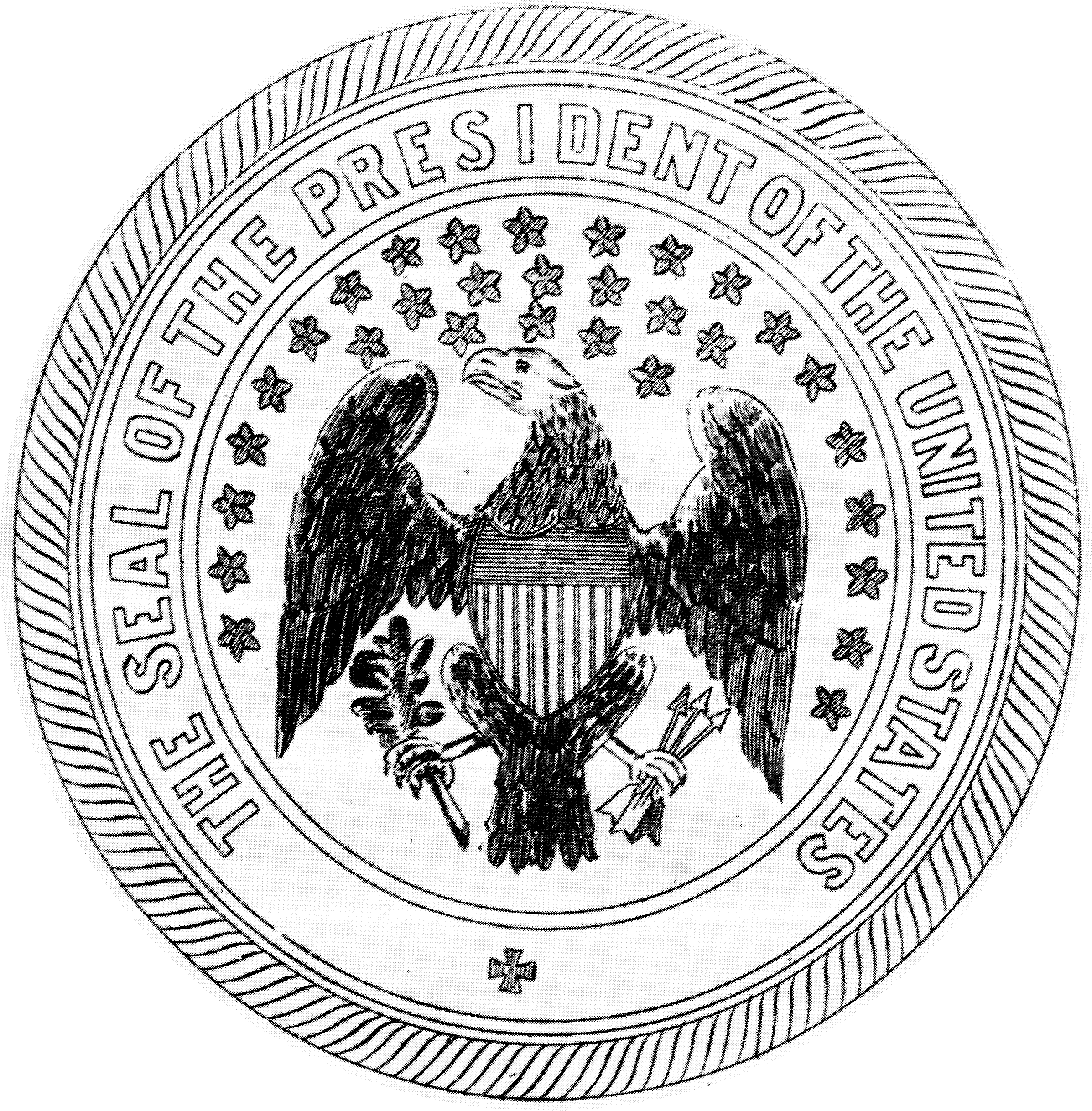
- Seal of the president (1850–1894)

Franklin Pierce served as the 14th president of the United States from March 4, 1853, to March 4, 1857. Pierce, a Democrat from New Hampshire, took office after defeating Whig Party nominee Winfield Scott in the 1852 presidential election. Seen by fellow Democrats as pleasant and accommodating to all the party's factions, Pierce, then a little-known politician, won the presidential nomination on the 49th ballot of the 1852 Democratic National Convention. His hopes for reelection ended after losing the Democratic nomination at the 1856 Democratic National Convention. He was succeeded by Democrat James Buchanan.

Pierce vetoed funding for internal improvements, called for a lower tariff, and vigorously enforced the Fugitive Slave Act of 1850. Influenced by the Young America expansionist movement, the Pierce administration completed the Gadsden land purchase from Mexico, clashed with Great Britain in Central America, and led a failed attempt to acquire Cuba from Spain. Pierce's administration was severely criticized after several of his diplomats issued the Ostend Manifesto, which called for the annexation of Cuba, by force if necessary. His popularity in the Northern free states declined sharply after he supported the 1854 Kansas–Nebraska Act, which nullified the Missouri Compromise. Passage of the act led directly to a long and violent conflict over the expansion of slavery in the Western United States.

In the wake of the Kansas–Nebraska Act, the Whig Party and the Democratic Party fell apart and national institutions were severely weakened. With the Whig Party's break-up, two new major parties emerged in the nativist American Party and the anti-slavery Republican Party. Pierce actively sought renomination at the 1856 Democratic National Convention, but the nomination went to James Buchanan, who had served as Pierce's ambassador to Great Britain. Buchanan went on to win the 1856 presidential election. Pierce is viewed by many historians as one of the worst presidents of the United States, whose failure to stem the nation's inter–sectional conflict accelerated the course towards civil war.

== Election of 1852 ==
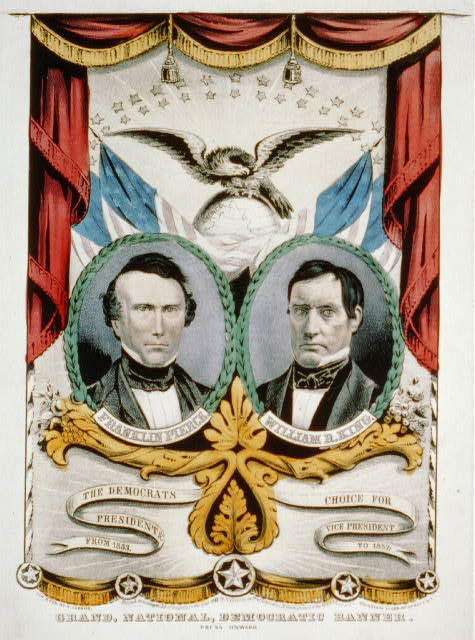
Campaign poster for the Pierce/King ticket

As the 1852 presidential election approached, the Democrats were divided by the slavery issue, though most of the "Barnburners" who had left the party in 1848 with Martin Van Buren had returned. Major presidential contenders included Stephen A. Douglas of Illinois, James Buchanan of Pennsylvania, William Marcy of New York, Sam Houston of Texas, Thomas Hart Benton of Missouri, and Lewis Cass of Michigan, the latter of whom had been the party's 1848 nominee. Due to the divisions in party and the lack of a strong Southern candidate, many Democratic leaders expected that the party would compromise on a lesser-known Northern candidate who held views acceptable to the South. New Hampshire Democrats, including Franklin Pierce, favored the nomination of Supreme Court Justice Levi Woodbury, but Woodbury died in 1851. After the death of Woodbury, New Hampshire Democrats coalesced around Pierce, a former member of Congress who had served as a brigadier general in the Mexican–American War. Pierce allowed his supporters to lobby for him, with the understanding that his name would not be entered at the convention unless it was clear none of the front-runners could win. To broaden his potential base of southern support as the convention approached, he wrote letters reiterating his support for the Compromise of 1850, including the controversial Fugitive Slave Act.

The 1852 Democratic National Convention assembled on June 1 in Baltimore, Maryland, and, as had been widely expected, a deadlock occurred. On the first ballot, 288 delegates, Cass claimed 116 of the 288 delegates, while Buchanan won 93 delegates and the remaining votes were scattered among various candidates. The next 34 ballots passed with no one near victory; Pierce did not receive a single vote on any of the ballots. Eventually, the Buchanan team decided to have their delegates vote for minor candidates, including Pierce, to demonstrate that no one but Buchanan could win. This novel tactic backfired after several ballots when Virginia, New Hampshire, and Maine switched to Pierce. After the 48th ballot, North Carolina Congressman James C. Dobbin delivered an unexpected and passionate endorsement of Pierce, sparking a wave of support for the dark horse candidate. On the 49th ballot, Pierce received all but six of the votes, and thus gained the Democratic nomination for president. Delegates selected Alabama Senator William R. King, a Buchanan supporter, as Pierce's running mate, and adopted a party platform that rejected further "agitation" over the slavery issue and supported the Compromise of 1850.

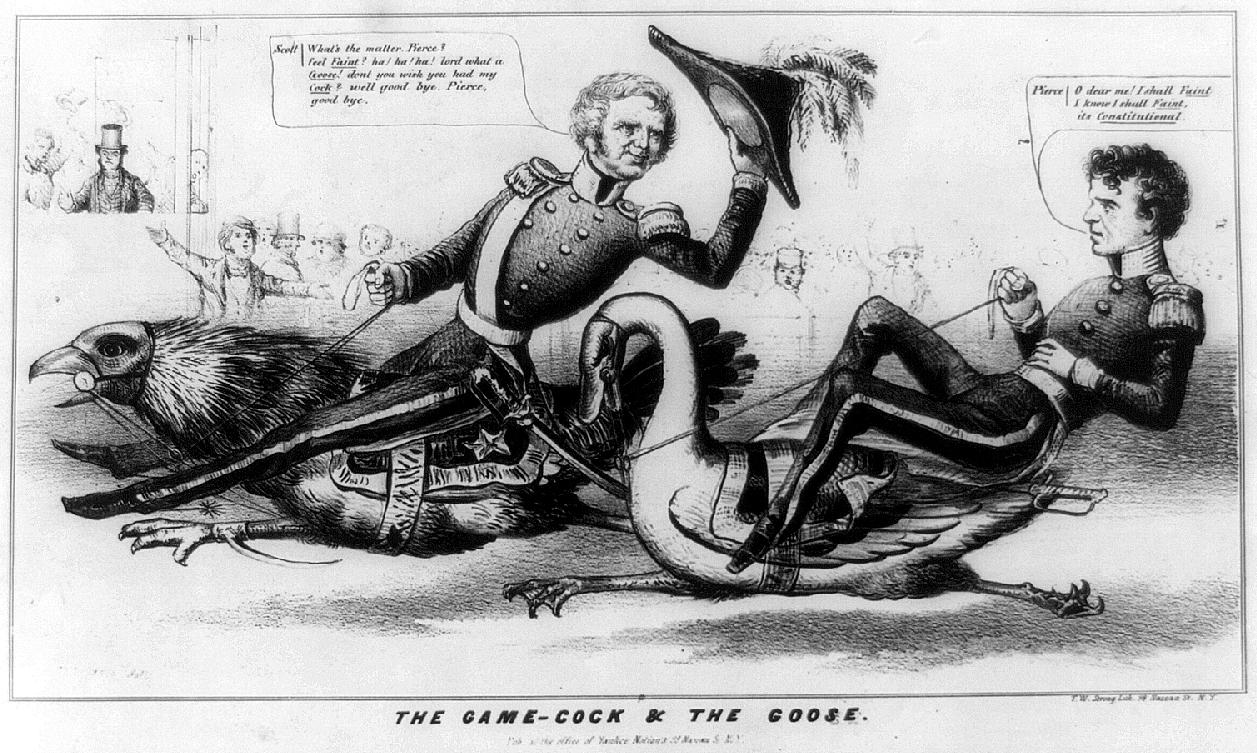
This anti-Pierce political cartoon depicts him as weak and cowardly

Rejecting incumbent President Millard Fillmore, the Whigs nominated General Winfield Scott, whom Pierce had served under in the Mexican–American War. The Whigs' convention adopted a platform almost indistinguishable from that of the Democrats, including support of the Compromise of 1850. This incited the Free Soilers to field their own candidate, Senator John P. Hale of New Hampshire, at the expense of the Whigs. The lack of political differences between the major parties reduced the campaign to a bitter personality contest and helped to dampen voter turnout in the election to its lowest level since 1836; it was, according to Pierce biographer Peter A. Wallner, "one of the least exciting campaigns in presidential history". Scott was harmed by the lack of enthusiasm of anti-slavery northern Whigs for the candidate and platform; New-York Tribune editor Horace Greeley summed up the attitude of many when he said of the Whig platform, "we defy it, execrate it, spit upon it". Southern Whigs were even less enthusiastic about Scott, since they feared that his administration would be dominated by anti-slavery northerners like William Seward. Pierce, meanwhile kept quiet so as not to upset his party's delicate unity, and allowed his allies to run the campaign. It was the custom at the time for candidates to not appear to seek the office, and he did no personal campaigning. Pierce's opponents caricatured him as an anti-Catholic coward and alcoholic ("the hero of many a well-fought bottle").

Electoral map of the 1852 presidential election.

Ultimately, Scott won only Kentucky, Tennessee, Massachusetts and Vermont, finishing with 42 electoral votes to Pierce's 254. With 3.2 million votes cast, Pierce won the popular vote with 50.9 to 44.1 percent. A sizable block of Free Soilers broke for Pierce's in-state rival, Hale, who won 4.9 percent of the popular vote. In the concurrent congressional elections, the Democrats increased their majorities in both houses of Congress.

== Post-election family tragedy ==
Pierce began his presidency in mourning. Weeks after his election, on January 6, 1853, the president-elect's family had been traveling from Boston by train when their car derailed and rolled down an embankment near Andover, Massachusetts. Pierce and his wife, Jane survived, but their only remaining son, Benjamin, was crushed to death. Pierce and Jane both suffered severe depression afterward, which likely affected Pierce's performance as president. Jane would avoid social functions for much of her first two years as First Lady, making her public debut in that role to great sympathy at the public reception held at the White House on New Year's Day, 1855.

Jane remained in New Hampshire as Pierce departed for his inauguration, which she did not attend.

== Inauguration ==
Pierce, the youngest man to be elected president to that point, chose to affirm his oath of office on a law book rather than swear it on a Bible, as all his predecessors except John Quincy Adams had done. He was the first president to deliver his inaugural address from memory. In the address he hailed an era of peace and prosperity at home and urged a vigorous assertion of U.S. interests in its foreign relations, including the "eminently important" acquisition of new territories. "The policy of my administration", said the new president, "will not be deterred by any timid forebodings of evil from expansion." Avoiding the word "slavery", he emphasized his desire to put the "important subject" to rest and maintain a peaceful union. He alluded to his own personal tragedy, telling the crowd, "You have summoned me in my weakness, you must sustain me by your strength."

== Administration ==
Pierce cabinet
Office	Name	Term
President	Franklin Pierce	1853–1857
Vice President	William R. King	1853
none	1853–1857
Secretary of State	William L. Marcy	1853–1857
Secretary of the Treasury	James Guthrie	1853–1857
Secretary of War	Jefferson Davis	1853–1857
Attorney General	Caleb Cushing	1853–1857
Postmaster General	James Campbell	1853–1857
Secretary of the Navy	James C. Dobbin	1853–1857
Secretary of the Interior	Robert McClelland	1853–1857

In his Cabinet appointments, Pierce sought to unite the party by appointing Democrats from all factions, including those that had not supported the Compromise of 1850. He anchored his Cabinet around Attorney General Caleb Cushing, a pro-compromise northerner, and Secretary of War Jefferson Davis, who had led Southern resistance to the compromise in the Senate. For the key position of Secretary of State, Pierce chose William Marcy, who had served as Secretary of War under President Polk. To appease the Cass and Buchanan wings of the party, Pierce appointed Secretary of the Interior Robert McClelland of Michigan and Postmaster General James Campbell of Pennsylvania, respectively. Pierce rounded out his geographically balanced Cabinet with Secretary of the Navy James C. Dobbin of North Carolina and Secretary of the Treasury James Guthrie of Kentucky. All initial Cabinet appointees would remain in place throughout Pierce's presidency. Pierce's Cabinet notably lacked a prominent Southern unionist such as Howell Cobb, and also did not include a representative from Stephen Douglas's faction of the party.

Pierce spent the first few weeks of his term sorting through hundreds of lower-level federal positions to be filled. This was a chore, as he sought to represent all factions of the party, and could fully satisfy none of them. Partisans found themselves unable to secure positions for their friends, which put the Democratic Party on edge and fueled bitterness between factions. Before long, northern newspapers accused Pierce of filling his government with pro-slavery secessionists, while Southern newspapers accused him of abolitionism. Factionalism between the pro- and anti-administration Democrats ramped up quickly, especially within the New York Democratic Party. The more conservative Hardshell Democrats or "Hards" of New York were deeply skeptical of the Pierce administration, which was associated with Secretary of State Marcy and the more moderate New York faction, the Softshell Democrats or "Softs".

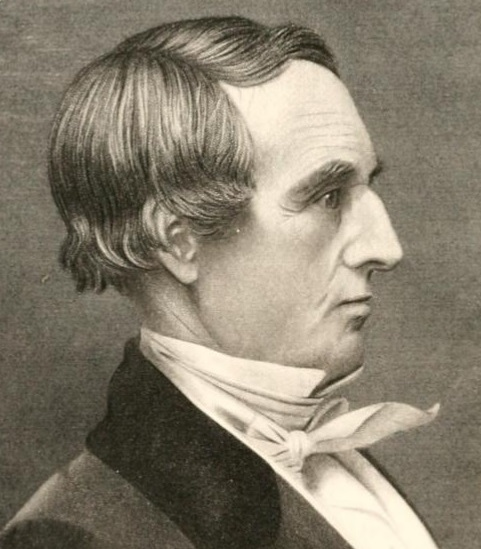
Pierce's Vice President William R. King died a little more than one month into his term, leaving a vacancy that could not be filled.

Pierce's running mate William R. King became severely ill with tuberculosis, and after the election he went to Cuba to recuperate. His condition deteriorated, and Congress passed a special law, allowing him to be sworn in before the American consul in Havana on March 24. Wanting to die at home, he returned to his plantation in Alabama on April 17 and died the next day. The office of vice president remained vacant for the remainder of Pierce's term, as the Constitution had no provision for filling an intra-term vice presidential vacancy prior to 1967. As such, the President pro tempore of the Senate, initially David Rice Atchison of Missouri, was next in line to the presidency for the remaining duration of Pierce's presidency.

== Judicial appointments ==
There was a vacancy on the Supreme Court when Pierce took office, due to the death of John McKinley in 1852. President Fillmore had made several nominations to fill the vacancy before the end of his term, but his nominees were denied confirmation by the Senate. Pierce quickly nominated John Archibald Campbell, an advocate of states' rights, for the seat; he would be Pierce's only Supreme Court appointment. Pierce also appointed three judges to the United States circuit courts and twelve judges to the United States district courts. He was the first president to appoint judges to the United States Court of Claims.

== Domestic affairs ==
The expansion of slavery into the western territories was the central issue of the day.

=== The slavery debate ===
==== Kansas–Nebraska Act ====
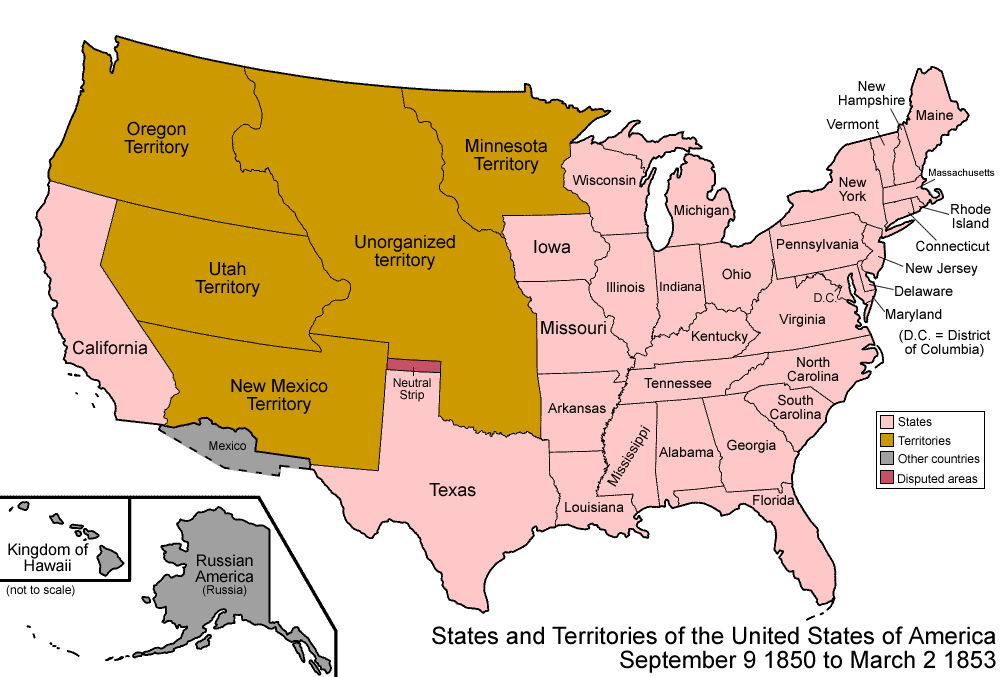
The United States after the Compromise of 1850

In his inaugural address, Pierce expressed hope that the Compromise of 1850 would settle the debate over the issue of slavery in the territories. The compromise had allowed slavery in Utah Territory and New Mexico Territory, which had been acquired in the Mexican–American War. The Missouri Compromise, which banned slavery in territories north of the 36°30′ parallel, remained in place for the other U.S. territories acquired in Louisiana Purchase, including a vast unorganized territory often referred to as "Nebraska". As settlers poured into the unorganized territory, and commercial and political interests called for a transcontinental railroad through the region, pressure mounted for the organization of the eastern parts of the unorganized territory. Organizing the territory was necessary for settlement as the land would not be surveyed nor put up for sale until a territorial government was authorized.

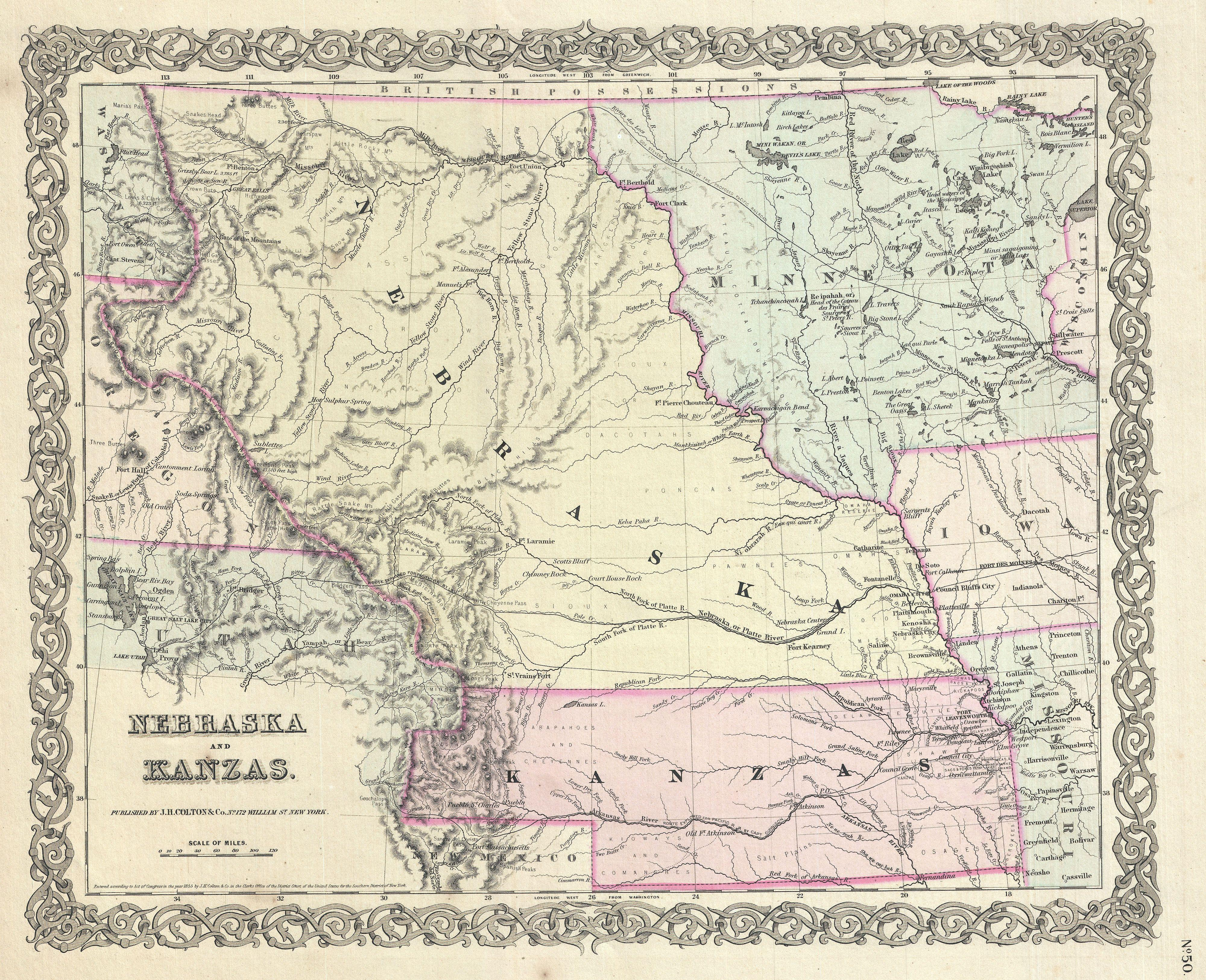
The Kansas–Nebraska Act organized Kansas (in pink) and Nebraska Territory (yellow).

Pierce wanted to organize the territories without explicitly addressing the matter of slavery, but Senator Stephen Douglas could not get enough southern support to accomplish this. Slave state leaders had never been content with western limits on slavery, and felt that slavery should be able to expand into territories, while many Northern leaders were strongly opposed to any such expansion. Douglas and his allies instead proposed a bill to organize the territory and let local settlers decide whether to allow slavery, effectively repealing the Missouri Compromise of 1820, as most of land in question was north of the 36°30′ parallel. Under Douglas's bill, two new territories would be created: Kansas Territory would be located directly west of Missouri, while Nebraska Territory would be located north of Kansas Territory. The common expectation was that the people of the Nebraska Territory would not allow slavery, while the people of the Kansas Territory would allow slavery.

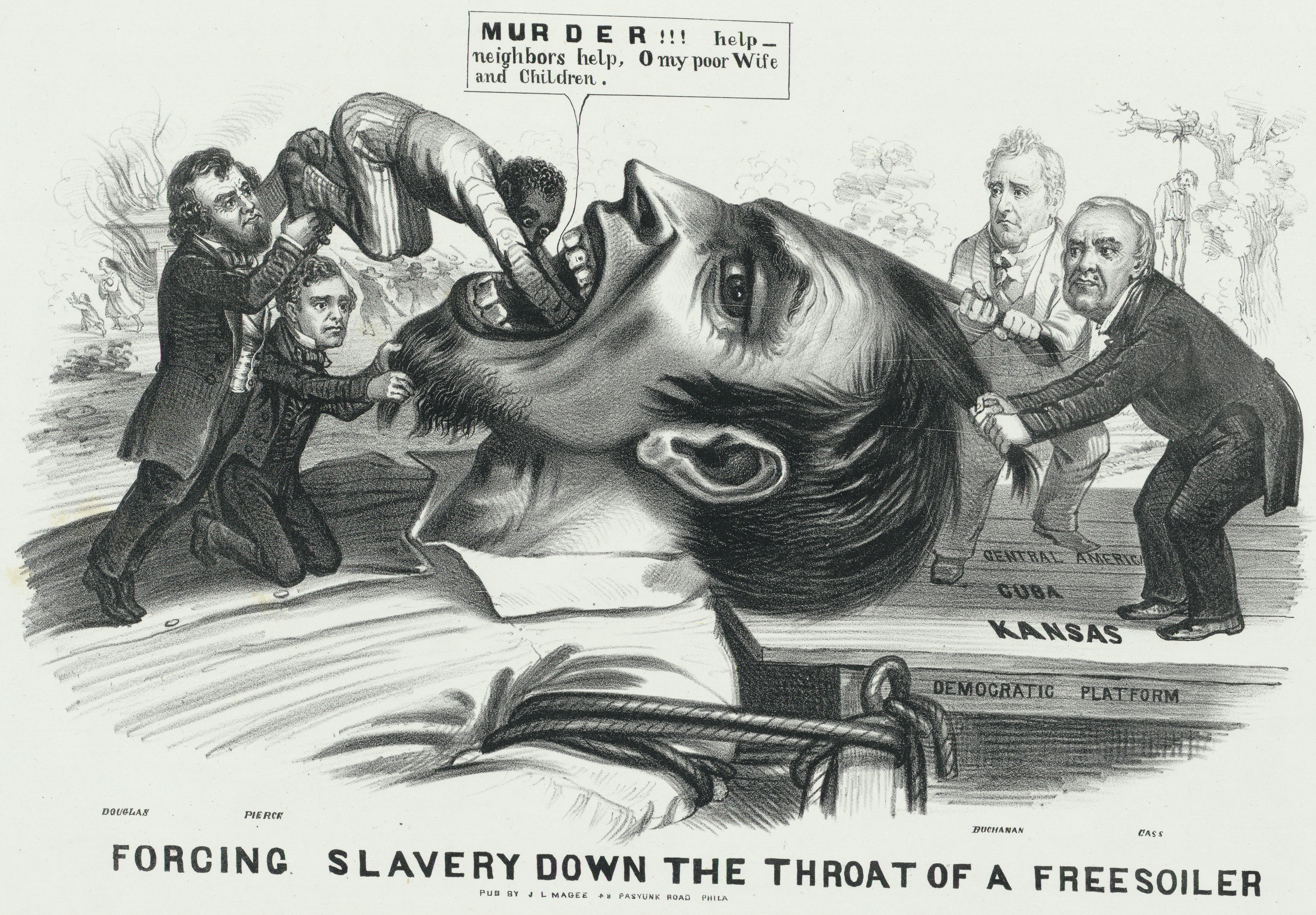
Northerners resented Pierce's attempted expansion of slavery through Kansas–Nebraska and Cuba. In this 1856 cartoon, a Free Soiler is held down by Pierce, Buchanan, and Cass while Douglas shoves "Slavery" (depicted as a black man) down his throat.

Pierce was initially skeptical of Douglas's bill, knowing it would arouse bitter opposition from the North, but Douglas, Secretary of War Davis, and a group of powerful Southern senators known as the "F Street Mess" convinced Pierce to support the bill. It was tenaciously opposed by Northerners such as Ohio Senator Salmon P. Chase and Massachusetts' Charles Sumner, who rallied public sentiment in the North against the bill. Many Northerners had been suspicious of the Pierce's expansionist foreign policy and the influence of slaveholding Cabinet members such as Davis, and they saw the Nebraska bill as part of a pattern of southern aggression. Pierce and his administration used threats and promises to keep most Democrats on board in favor of the bill. The Whigs split along sectional lines, and the conflict finally destroyed the ailing party. The Kansas–Nebraska Act passed the Senate with relative ease, but was nearly derailed in the House. Pressure by Douglas and Pierce, combined with the support of many Southern Whigs, ensured the bill's passage in May 1854. In both the House and the Senate, every Northern Whig voted against the Kansas–Nebraska Act, while just under half of the Northern Democrats and the vast majority of Southern congressmen of both parties voted for the act.

==== Bleeding Kansas ====
Even as the Kansas-Nebraska Act was being debated, settlers on both sides of the slavery issue poured into Kansas so as to influence the status of slavery in Kansas. The passage of the act resulted in so much violence between groups that the territory became known as Bleeding Kansas. The New England Emigrant Aid Society assisted anti-slavery farmers to move to Kansas, and John Brown and his sons soon proved themselves the most memorable of these immigrants. But the anti-slavery farmers were outnumbered by the thousands of pro-slavery Border Ruffians who came across from Missouri to vote in the Kansas elections, giving the pro-slavery element control over the territorial government. Pierce supported the outcome despite the irregularities. The new legislature subsequently adopted laws that criminalized reading Free Soil literature, disenfranchised those who refused to uphold the Fugitive Slave Act, and barred non-slave owners from holding public office. When Free-Staters set up a shadow government and drafted the Topeka Constitution, Pierce called their work an act of rebellion and ordered an army contingent to prevent the Topeka government from meeting.

The president continued to recognize the pro-slavery legislature, which was dominated by Democrats, even after a congressional investigative committee found its election to have been illegitimate. In response to Pierce's actions, several Northern state legislatures passed resolutions in support of anti-slavery groups in Kansas. Robert Toombs arranged a compromise Kansas statehood bill that won passage in the Senate, but Pierce's opponents in the House defeated the bill. The violence in Kansas escalated in 1856, and pro-slavery forces ransacked the town of Lawrence, Kansas. That same year, in the Pottawatomie massacre, an anti-slavery group led by John Brown killed pro-slavery settlers. The situation calmed somewhat after Pierce appointed the even-handed John W. Geary as governor of the territory, but tensions remained high by the time Pierce left office.

==== Other issues ====
Passage of the Kansas-Nebraska Act coincided with the seizure of escaped slave Anthony Burns in Boston. Northerners rallied in support of Burns, but Pierce was determined to follow the Fugitive Slave Act to the letter, and dispatched federal troops to enforce Burns' return to his Virginia owner despite furious crowds. The simultaneous repeal of the Missouri Compromise of 1820 and the enforcement of the Fugitive Slave Act alienated many Northerners, including those who had formerly accepted the Fugitive Slave Act as a sectional compromise. Textile magnate Amos Adams Lawrence described the reaction of many Northern Whigs to the Pierce administration's enforcement of fugitive slave law, writing "we went to bed one night old fashioned, conservative, Compromise Union Whigs and woke up stark mad abolitionists." Several northern states enacted personal liberty laws designed to prevent the kidnapping of free blacks and to make it more difficult to enforce the Fugitive Slave Act. Fugitive slave controversies, including that of Margaret Garner, continued to attract controversy throughout Pierce's presidency.

In response to an anti-slavery speech by Senator Charles Sumner, Congressman Preston Brooks of South Carolina beat Sumner with a cane, leaving Sumner unable to return to the Senate until 1859. The House of Representatives voted to censure Brooks, and Brooks resigned from the House only to win re-election shortly thereafter. Many in the South supported Brooks's actions; the Richmond Enquirer wrote that the "Vulgar Abolitionists are getting above themselves...They must be lashed into submission." Many northerners, meanwhile, were horrified by the political violence.

=== Partisan re-alignment ===
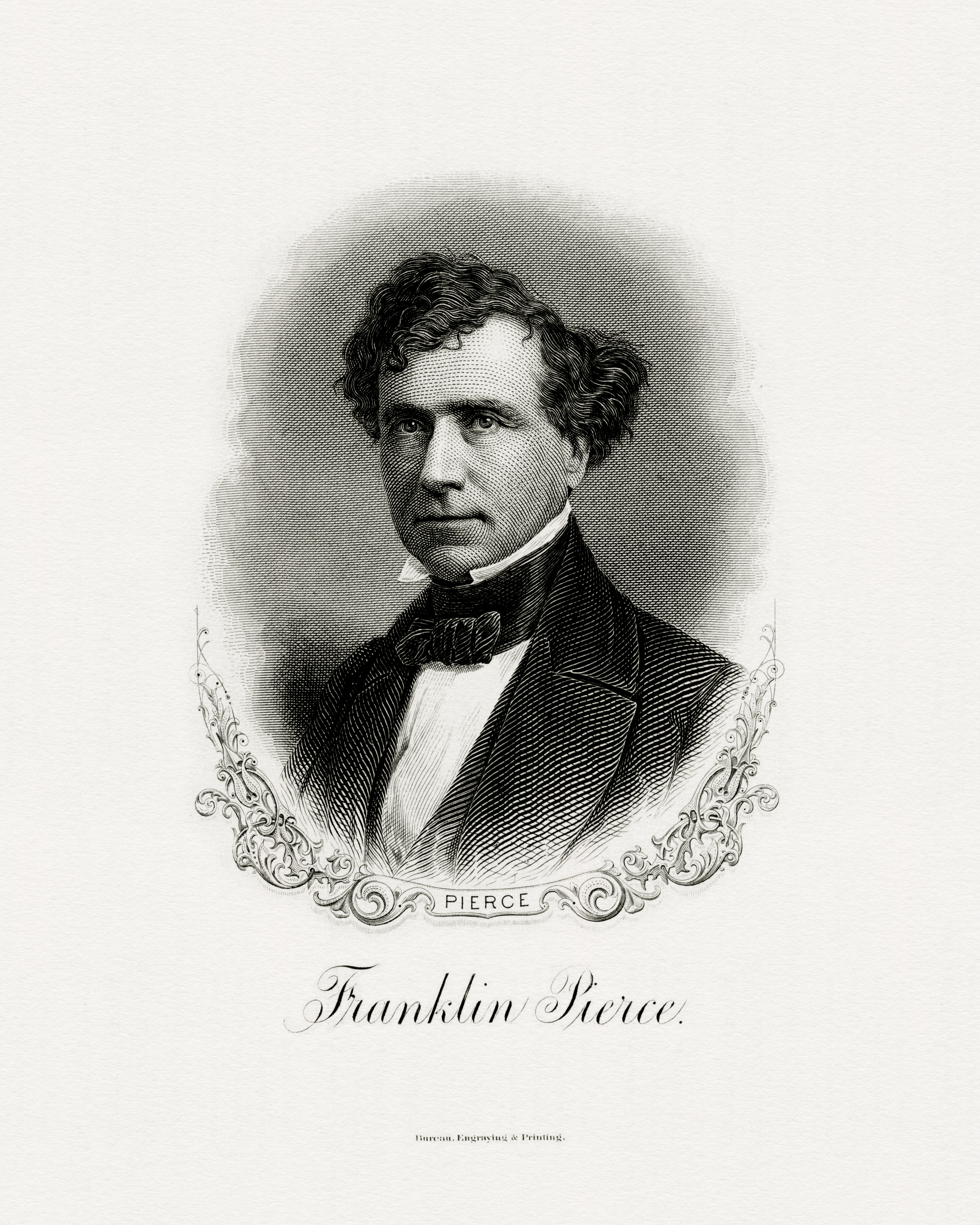
BEP-engraved portrait of Pierce as president

The Compromise of 1850 had split both major parties along geographic lines. In several Northern states, Democrats opposed to the compromise had joined with the Free Soil Party to take control of state governments. In the South, many state parties had also been split by the compromise. The vast majority of northerners did not favor abolition, but northerners were hostile to the extension of slavery into the western territories, since they feared that such extension would lead to the exclusion of settlers from free states. Supporters of the "Free Soil" movement (which was not exclusive to members of the Free Soil Party) wanted to limit slavery to the states in which it currently existed. Southerners, meanwhile, resented any interference with their institutions and believed that slavery's continued existence required the expansion of the practice into the territories.

Hoping to keep his own party unified, Pierce appointed both supporters and opponents of the Compromise of 1850 from both the North and South. This policy infuriated both supporters and opponents of the compromise, particularly in the South. Pierce demanded that all loyal Democrats support the Kansas-Nebraska Act, hoping that debates over that act and the development of the West would reinvigorate partisan conflict and distract from intra-party battles. But the bill instead polarized legislators sectional lines, with Southern Whigs providing critical votes in the House as a narrow majority of Northern Democrats voted against it. The Whigs, meanwhile, continued to decline as a party. The Free Soil Party won support from many who were sympathetic to the temperance movement, while the Know Nothing movement capitalized on growing nativist fears over Catholic immigrants. This nativism was fueled by an increase in immigration during the 1850s, as well as higher crime rates and spending on relief for the poor, which many voters attributed to immigration. William Seward and some other Northern Whigs tried to bring Free Soilers and Democrats who were opposed to the Kansas-Nebraska Act into the Whig Party, but many of these individuals preferred to establish a new party dedicated to "the establishment of liberty and the overthrow of the Slave Power." A new, anti-slavery party was established at a rally in Ripon, Wisconsin, in May 1854, and that party became known as the Republican Party. Republican leaders, including Abraham Lincoln did not call for the abolition of slavery, but instead called for Congress to prevent the extension of slavery into the territories.

Congressional Democrats suffered huge losses in the mid-term elections of 1854, as voters provided support to a wide array of new parties opposed to the Democrats and the Kansas-Nebraska Act. In several states, opponents of the Kansas-Nebraska Act and the Democratic Party merely labeled themselves the "Opposition." Members of the Know Nothing movement defeated numerous Northeastern and Southern congressional candidates from both the Whig and Democratic parties. Most Northern Know Nothings opposed the Kansas-Nebraska Act, and anti-slavery groups allied with the Know Nothing movement in several states despite the discomfort many anti-slavery leaders felt towards nativism. In Pierce's home state of New Hampshire, hitherto loyal to the Democratic Party, the Know-Nothings elected the governor, all three representatives, dominated the legislature, and returned John P. Hale to the Senate. When the 34th Congress convened, the House consisted of approximately 105 Republicans, 80 Democrats, and 50 members of the Know Nothing-affiliated American Party. Nathaniel Banks, who was affiliated with both the Know Nothings and the Free Soil Party, won election as Speaker of the House after a protracted battle.

By 1855, Republicans had replaced the Whigs as the main opposition to the Democrats in about half of the states, with the Know Nothings displacing the Whigs in the remaining states. Some Democrats joined the American Party in states like Maryland, but in many Southern states the American Party consisted almost entirely of former Whigs. The Know Nothings soon split along sectional lines over a proposal to restore the Missouri Compromise, and as the controversy over Kansas continued, Know Nothings, Whigs, and even Democrats became increasingly attracted to the Republican Party. Pierce declared his full opposition the Republican Party, decrying what he saw as its anti-southern stance, but his perceived pro-Southern actions in Kansas continued to inflame Northern anger.

=== Economic policy and internal improvements ===
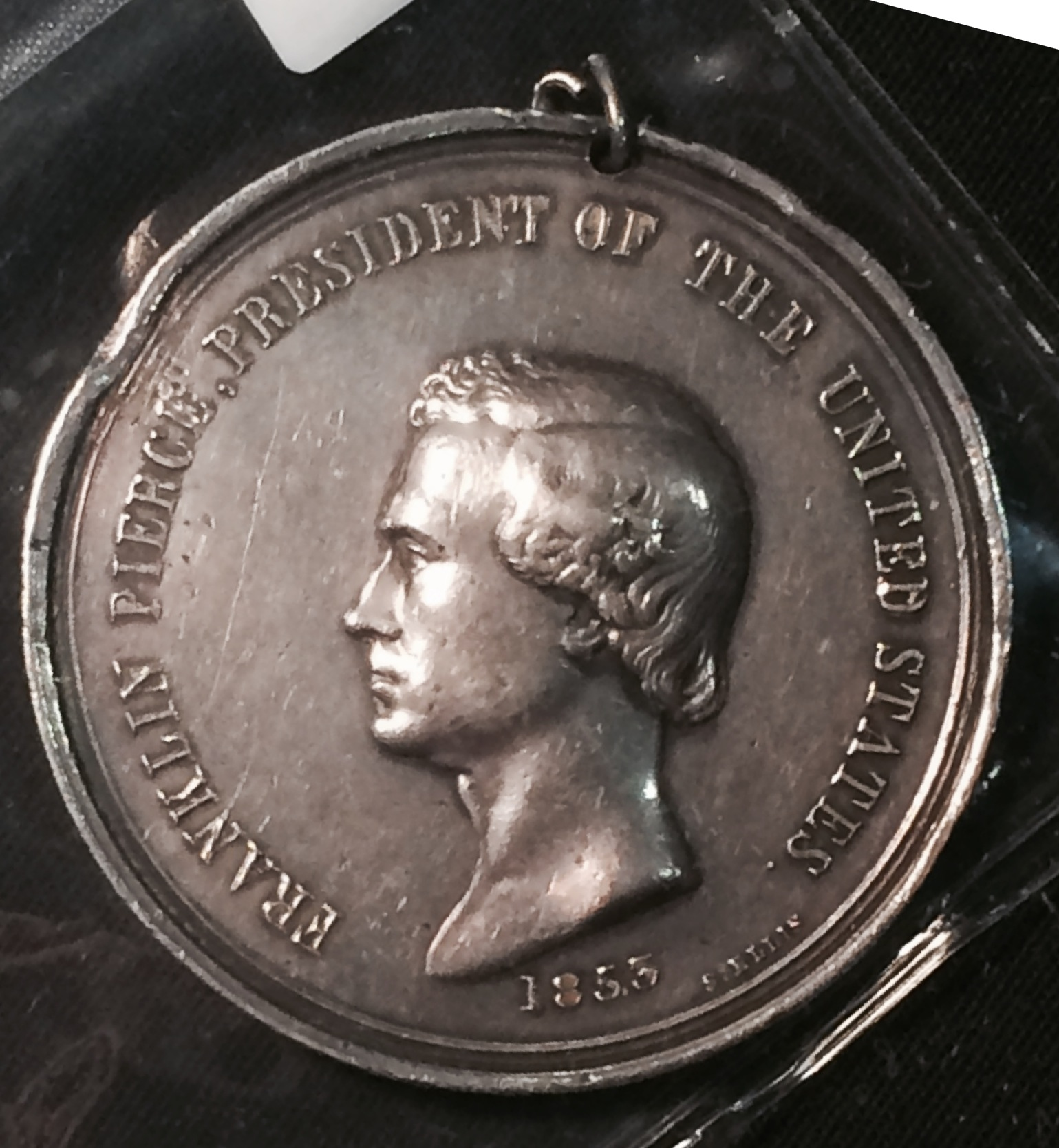
Indian Peace Medal depicting Pierce

Pierce inaugurated the 1853 New York's World Fair

Pierce frequently vetoed federally-funded internal improvements such as roads and canals. The first bill he vetoed would have provided funding for mental asylums, a cause championed by reformer Dorothea Dix. In vetoing the bill, Pierce stated, "I cannot find any authority in the Constitution for making the Federal Government the great almoner of public charity throughout the United States." Though he vetoed several other internal improvement projects, Pierce did sign some bills providing for federal funding for infrastructure projects; Northern critics charged that Pierce tended to favor projects that benefited the South. Pierce also called for a lowering of the Walker tariff, which had itself lowered the tariff rates to an historically low level. In the final days of his presidency, Pierce signed the Tariff of 1857, which further reduced tariff rates.

Despite his opposition to federal funding for most infrastructure projects, Pierce favored federal aid for the construction of a transcontinental railroad. Secretary of War Davis, at Pierce's request, led surveys with the Corps of Topographical Engineers of possible transcontinental railroad routes throughout the country. The Democratic Party had long rejected federal appropriations for internal improvements, but Davis felt that such a project could be justified as a Constitutional national security objective. Davis also deployed the Army Corps of Engineers to supervise construction projects in the District of Columbia, including the expansion of the United States Capitol and building of the Washington Monument. The Army Corps of Engineers surveyed four possible transcontinental railroad routes, all of which would eventually be used by railroads. Davis favored the most Southern railroad route, which extended from New Orleans to San Diego, and his opposition to more Northern routes helped ensure that the construction of a transcontinental railroad would not begin until after Pierce left office.

=== Administrative reforms ===
Pierce sought to run a more efficient and accountable government than his predecessors. His cabinet members implemented an early system of civil service examinations which was a forerunner to the Pendleton Act passed three decades later. The Interior Department was reformed by Secretary Robert McClelland, who systematized its operations, expanded the use of paper records, and pursued fraud. Another of Pierce's reforms was to expand the role of the attorney general in appointing federal judges and attorneys, which was an important step in the eventual development of the Justice Department. Pierce charged Treasury Secretary Guthrie with reforming the Treasury Department, which was inefficiently managed and had many unsettled accounts. Guthrie increased oversight of Treasury employees and tariff collectors, many of whom were withholding money from the government. Despite laws requiring funds to be held in the Treasury, large deposits remained in private banks under the Whig administrations. Guthrie reclaimed these funds and sought to prosecute corrupt officials, with mixed success.

== Foreign and military affairs ==
The Pierce administration fell in line with the expansionist Young America movement, with William L. Marcy leading the charge as Secretary of State. Marcy sought to present to the world a distinctively American, republican image. He issued a circular recommending that U.S. diplomats wear "the simple dress of an American citizen" instead of the elaborate diplomatic uniforms worn in the courts of Europe, and that they only hire American citizens to work in consulates. Marcy received international praise for his 73-page letter defending Austrian refugee Martin Koszta, who had been captured abroad in mid-1853 by the Austrian government despite his intention to become a U.S. citizen.

Letter from Franklin Pierce to President Carlos Antonio Lopez of Paraguay

=== Gadsden Purchase ===
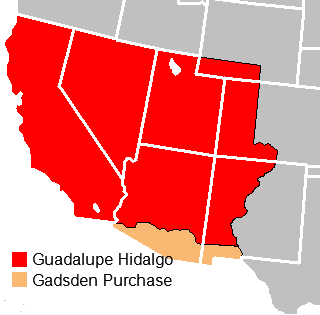
A map of the lands ceded by Mexico in the 1848 Treaty of Guadalupe Hidalgo and the 1853 Gadsden Purchase

Secretary of War Davis, an advocate of a southern transcontinental railroad route, persuaded Pierce to send rail magnate James Gadsden to Mexico to buy land for a potential railroad. Gadsden was also charged with re-negotiating provisions of the Treaty of Guadalupe Hidalgo which required the U.S. to prevent Native American raids into Mexico from New Mexico Territory. Pierce authorized Gadsden to negotiate a treaty offering $50 million for large portions of Northern Mexico, including all of Baja California. Gadsden ultimately concluded a less far-reaching treaty with Mexican President Antonio López de Santa Anna in December 1853, purchasing a portion of the Mexican state of Sonora. Negotiations were nearly derailed by William Walker's unauthorized expedition into Mexico, and so a clause was included charging the U.S. with combating future such attempts. Other provisions in the treaty included U.S. assumption of all private claims by American citizens against the Mexican government, and American access to the Isthmus of Tehuantepec for transit. Pierce was disappointed by the treaty, and Gadsden would later claim that, if not for Walker's expedition, Mexico would have ceded the Baja California Peninsula and more of the state of Sonora.

The treaty received a hostile reception from northern congressmen, many of whom saw it as another move designed to benefit the Slave Power. Congress reduced the Gadsden Purchase to the region now comprising southern Arizona and part of southern New Mexico; the original treaty had ceded a port on the Gulf of California to the United States. Congress also reduced the amount of money being paid to Mexico from $15 million to $10 million, and included a protection clause for a private citizen, Albert G. Sloo, whose interests were threatened by the purchase. Pierce opposed the use of the federal government to prop up private industry and did not endorse the final version of the treaty, which was ratified nonetheless. The acquisition brought the contiguous United States to its present-day boundaries, excepting later minor adjustments.

=== Relations with Britain ===
During Pierce's presidency, relations with the United Kingdom were tense due to disputes over American fishing rights in Canada and U.S. and British ambitions in Central America. Marcy completed a trade reciprocity agreement with British minister to Washington, John Crampton, which would reduce the need for British naval patrols in Canadian waters. The treaty, which Pierce saw as a first step towards the American annexation of Canada, was ratified in August 1854. While the administration negotiated with Britain over the Canada–U.S. border, U.S. interests were also threatened in Central America, where the Clayton–Bulwer Treaty of 1850 had failed to keep Britain from expanding its influence. Secretary of State Buchanan sought to persuade Britain to relinquish their territories in Central America.

Seeking to ensure friendly relations with the United States during the Crimean War, the British were prepared to renounce most of their claims in Central America, but an incident in the British-protected port of Greytown soured Anglo-American relations. The murder of an employee of an American company led Pierce to order the USS Cyane to Greytown, and Cyane destroyed Greytown. Despite the destruction of Greytown and American filibusters in Central America, British merchants strongly opposed any war with the United States, ensuring that no war broke out between the two countries. Buchanan's successor as ambassador to Britain, George M. Dallas, concluded a treaty with Britain in which the British agreed to withdraw from Greytown and most other Central American territories in return for U.S. recognition of British interests in Belize, but the Senate did not ratify the agreement.

=== Cuba policy and the Ostend Manifesto ===
Like many of his predecessors, Pierce hoped to annex the Spanish island of Cuba, which possessed wealthy sugar plantations, held a strategic position in the Caribbean Sea, and represented the possibility of a new slave state. Pierce appointed Young America adherent Pierre Soulé as his minister to Spain, and Soulé quickly alienated the Spanish government. After the Black Warrior Affair, in which the Spanish seized a U.S. merchant ship in Havana, the Pierce administration contemplated invading Cuba or aiding a filibuster expedition with the same intent, but the administration ultimately decided on focusing its efforts on the purchase of Cuba from Spain.

Ambassadors Soulé, Buchanan, and John Y. Mason drafted a document that proposed to purchase Cuba from Spain for $120 million (USD), but also attempted to justify the "wresting" of Cuba from Spain if the offer were refused. The document, essentially a position paper meant only for the consumption of the Pierce administration, did not offer any new thinking on the U.S. position towards Cuba and Spain, and was not intended to serve as a public edict. Nonetheless, the publication of the Ostend Manifesto provoked the scorn of northerners who viewed it as an attempt to annex a slave-holding possession. Publication of the document helped discredit the expansionist policy of Manifest Destiny the Democratic Party had often championed.

=== Other issues ===
Secretary of War Davis and Navy Secretary James C. Dobbin found the Army and Navy in poor condition, with insufficient forces, a reluctance to adopt new technology, and inefficient management. During the Pierce administration, Congress increased the proportion of the federal budget spent on the War Department from 20 percent to 28 percent. Davis directed this money to fund a larger army, improvements to the United States Military Academy, and other measures. Dobbin favored several reforms, including a transition of the Navy to steam power, and he won congressional authorization for the construction of several new ships.

During the Pierce administration, Commodore Matthew C. Perry visited Japan (a venture originally planned under Fillmore) in an effort to expand trade to the East. Perry signed a modest trade treaty with the Japanese shogunate which was successfully ratified. Marcy selected the first American consul to Japan, Townsend Harris, who helped further expand trade between Japan and the United States. Perry also advocated the American colonization of Taiwan, Okinawa, and the Bonin Islands, but the Pierce administration did not endorse Perry's proposals.

Pierce attempted to purchase Samaná Bay from the Dominican Republic, since he feared that the Dominican Republican's instability would lead it to an alliance with France or Spain. The Dominican insistence on protection of the rights of Dominican citizens in the United States "without distinction of race or colour" prevented any Dominican-American treaty from being reached. The Pierce administration explored the possibility of annexing the Kingdom of Hawaii, but King Kamehameha III's insistence on full citizenship for all Hawaiian citizens regardless of race precluded any possibility of annexation during Pierce's presidency.

In 1856, Congress passed the Guano Islands Act, which allowed U.S. citizens to take possession of unclaimed islands containing guano deposits. Guano, the accumulated excrement of seabirds, was valuable as a fertilizer. Long after Pierce left office, the act would be used to make claims on several territories, including the Midway Atoll.

William Walker, an American Freebooter, had conquered and established a dictatorship in Nicaragua. Among other actions, he had begun to introduce slavery. In 1856, Pierce formally recognized Walker's dictatorship. Though Walker hoped for Nicaragua to enter the US as a slave state, his plan never materialized.

== Election of 1856 and transition ==
As the 1856 election approached, many Democrats spoke of replacing Pierce with Buchanan or Douglas, but Pierce retained the support of his cabinet and many others within the party, especially in the South. Buchanan, who had been outside of the country since 1853 and thus could not be associated with the unpopular Kansas-Nebraska Act, became the candidate of many Northern Democrats. When balloting began on June 5 at the convention in Cincinnati, Ohio, Pierce expected to win a plurality, if not the required two-thirds majority, of the vote. On the first ballot, he received only 122 votes, many of them from the South, to Buchanan's 135, with Douglas and Cass receiving the remaining votes. By the following morning fourteen ballots had been completed, but none of the three main candidates were able to get two-thirds of the vote. Pierce, whose support had been slowly declining as the ballots passed, directed his supporters to break for Douglas, withdrawing his name in a last-ditch effort to defeat Buchanan. Douglas, only 43 years of age, believed that he could be nominated in 1860 if he let the older Buchanan win this time, and received assurances from Buchanan's managers that this would be the case. After two more deadlocked ballots, Douglas's managers withdrew his name, leaving Buchanan as the clear winner. To soften the blow to Pierce, the convention issued a resolution of "unqualified approbation" in praise of his administration and selected his ally, former Kentucky Representative John C. Breckinridge, as the vice-presidential nominee. This loss marked the only time in U.S. history that an elected president who was an active candidate for reelection was not nominated for a second term.

In the 1856 presidential election, Democrat James Buchanan defeated Republican John C. Frémont and American Party nominee Millard Fillmore.

Pierce endorsed Buchanan, though the two remained distant, and the president attempted to resolve the Kansas situation by November to improve the Democrats' chances in the general election. Though Governor Geary was able to restore order in Kansas, the electoral damage had already been done—Republicans used "Bleeding Kansas" and "Bleeding Sumner" (the brutal caning of Charles Sumner) as election slogans. The Democratic Party's platform, along with Buchanan's endorsement of Pierce's policies, caused many northern Democrats to abandon the party. The 1856 Republican National Convention chose John C. Frémont as the party's presidential candidate. Though Frémont's public views were not widely known, Republicans hoped to use Frémont's military reputation to lead the party to victory in 1856. The Know Nothing National Convention, meanwhile, alienated many Northern Know Nothings by nominating former President Fillmore for another term and declining to oppose the Kansas-Nebraska Act. Fillmore also received the presidential nomination at the sparsely attended 1856 Whig convention. Fillmore minimized the issue of nativism, instead attempting to use the party as a platform for unionism and a revival of the Whig Party.

The Democratic ticket was elected, but Buchanan won only five of sixteen free states (Pierce had won fourteen). Frémont, the Republican nominee, swept the eleven remaining free states, while Fillmore won Maryland and likely helped keep Pennsylvania out of the Republican column. In the North, the Democratic share of the popular vote fell from Pierce's 49.8% in 1852 to just 41.4%. The strong Republican showing confirmed that they, and not the Know Nothings, would replace the Whigs as the main opposition to the Democrats.

Pierce did not temper his rhetoric after losing the nomination. In his final message to Congress, delivered in December 1856, he blamed anti-slavery activists for Bleeding Kansas and vigorously attacked the Republican Party as a threat to the unity of the nation. He also took the opportunity to defend his record on fiscal policy, and on achieving peaceful relations with other nations. In the final days of the Pierce administration, Congress passed bills to increase the pay of army officers and to build new naval vessels, also expanding the number of seamen enlisted. It also passed a tariff reduction bill he had long sought, establishing the Tariff of 1857. During the transition period, Pierce avoided criticizing Buchanan, who he had long disliked, but was angered by Buchanan's decision to assemble an entirely new cabinet. Pierce and his cabinet left office on March 4, 1857, the only time in U.S. history that the original cabinet members all remained for a full four-year term.

== Historical reputation ==
After Pierce died in 1869, he mostly passed from the American consciousness, except as one of a series of presidents whose disastrous tenures led to civil war. Historians generally view him as an inept president who was overwhelmed by the problems he faced, and they tend to rank Pierce as one of the worst presidents. Historian Eric Foner says, "His administration turned out to be one of the most disastrous in American history. It witnessed the collapse of the party system inherited from the Age of Jackson." A 2018 poll of the American Political Science Association’s Presidents and Executive Politics section ranked Pierce as the fifth-worst president. A 2017 C-SPAN poll of historians ranked Pierce as the third-worst president. The public placed him third-to-last among his peers in C-SPAN surveys (2000 and 2009).

The failure of Pierce, as president, to secure sectional conciliation helped bring an end to the dominance of the Democratic Party that had started with Jackson, and led to a period of over seventy years when the Republicans mostly controlled national politics. David Potter concludes that the Ostend Manifesto and the Kansas–Nebraska Act were "the two great calamities of the Franklin Pierce administration ... Both brought down an avalanche of public criticism." More important, says Potter, they permanently discredited Manifest Destiny and "popular sovereignty" as political doctrines. Historian Kenneth Nivison, writing in 2010, takes a more favorable view of Pierce's foreign policy, stating that his expansionism prefaced those of later presidents William McKinley and Theodore Roosevelt, who served at a time when America had the military might to make her desires stick. "American foreign and commercial policy beginning in the 1890s, which eventually supplanted European colonialism by the middle of the twentieth century, owed much to the paternalism of Jacksonian Democracy cultivated in the international arena by the Presidency of Franklin Pierce."

Historian Larry Gara writes:

[Pierce] was president at a time that called for almost superhuman skills, yet he lacked such skills and never grew into the job to which he had been elected. His view of the Constitution and the Union was from the Jacksonian past. He never fully understood the nature or depth of Free Soil sentiment in the North. He was able to negotiate a reciprocal trade treaty with Canada, to begin the opening of Japan to western trade, to add land to the Southwest, and to sign legislation for the creation of an overseas empire [the Guano Islands Act]. His Cuba and Kansas policies led only to deeper sectional strife. His support for the Kansas–Nebraska Act and his determination to enforce the Fugitive Slave Act helped polarize the sections. Pierce was hard-working and his administration largely untainted by graft, yet the legacy from those four turbulent years contributed to the tragedy of secession and civil war.

Biographer Roy Nichols argues:

As a national political leader Pierce was an accident. He was honest and tenacious of his views but, as he made up his mind with difficulty and often reversed himself before making a final decision, he gave a general impression of instability. Kind, courteous, generous, he attracted many individuals, but his attempts to satisfy all factions failed and made him many enemies. In carrying out his principles of strict construction he was most in accord with Southerners, who generally had the letter of the law on their side. He failed utterly to realize the depth and the sincerity of Northern feeling against the South and was bewildered at the general flouting of the law and the Constitution, as he described it, by the people of his own New England. At no time did he catch the popular imagination. His inability to cope with the difficult problems that arose early in his administration caused him to lose the respect of great numbers, especially in the North, and his few successes failed to restore public confidence. He was an inexperienced man, suddenly called to assume a tremendous responsibility, who honestly tried to do his best without adequate training or temperamental fitness.
