= Black Warrior =

Black Warrior may refer to:

- Black Warrior (wrestler), a professional wrestler (luchador)
- Xuanwu (god), a Taoist god whose name is sometimes translated as "the Black Warrior"
  - Black Tortoise, a Chinese constellation also known as the Black Warrior of the North
- Tuskaloosa, a paramount chief whose name is often translated as "Black Warrior"
  - Black Warrior River, a river in Alabama named for Tuskaloosa
  - Black Warrior Basin, a geological feature in Alabama and Mississippi
  - CSS Black Warrior, a ship named for Tuskaloosa
  - The Black Warrior Affair between Spain and the United States, named for a ship named for Tuskaloosa
  - Black Warrior Review, a literary magazine in Tuscaloosa, Alabama

== See also ==
- Guerrero Negro, the largest town in the municipality of Mulegé in the Mexican state of Baja California Sur, whose name translates as "Black Warrior"
