= Ostend Manifesto =

1854 document on US-Spain relations

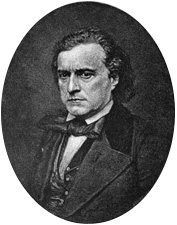
Pierre Soulé, the driving force behind the Ostend Manifesto

The Ostend Manifesto, also known as the Ostend Circular, was a document written in 1854 that described the rationale for the United States to purchase Cuba from Spain while implying that the U.S. should declare war if Spain refused. Cuba's annexation had long been a goal of U.S. slaveholding expansionists. At the national level, American leaders had been satisfied to have the island remain in weak Spanish hands so long as it did not pass to a stronger power such as Britain or France. The Ostend Manifesto proposed a shift in foreign policy, justifying the use of force to seize Cuba in the name of national security. It resulted from debates over slavery in the United States, manifest destiny, and the Monroe Doctrine, as slaveholders sought new territory for the expansion of slavery.

During the administration of President Franklin Pierce, a pro-Southern Democrat, Southern expansionists called for acquiring Cuba as a slave state, but the outbreak of violence following the Kansas–Nebraska Act left the administration unsure of how to proceed. At the suggestion of Secretary of State William L. Marcy, American ministers in Europe—Pierre Soulé for Spain, James Buchanan for Britain, and John Y. Mason for France—met to discuss strategy related to an acquisition of Cuba. They met secretly at Ostend, Belgium, and drafted a dispatch at Aachen, Prussia. The document was sent to Washington in October 1854, outlining why a purchase of Cuba would be beneficial to each of the nations and declaring that the U.S. would be "justified in wresting" the island from Spanish hands if Spain refused to sell. To Marcy's chagrin, Soulé made no secret of the meetings, causing unwanted publicity in both Europe and the U.S.

The dispatch was published as demanded by the House of Representatives. Dubbed the "Ostend Manifesto", it was immediately denounced in both the Northern states and Europe. The Pierce administration suffered a significant setback, and the manifesto became a rallying cry for anti-slavery Northerners. The question of Cuba's annexation was effectively set aside until the late 19th century, when support grew for Cuban independence from Spain.

== Historical context ==
Located 90 miles (140 km) off the coast of Florida, Cuba had been discussed as a subject for annexation in several presidential administrations. Presidents John Quincy Adams and Thomas Jefferson expressed great interest in Cuba, with Adams observing during his Secretary of State tenure that it had "become an object of transcendent importance to the commercial and political interests of our Union". He later described Cuba and Puerto Rico as "natural appendages to the North American continent"—the former's annexation was "indispensable to the continuance and integrity of the Union itself". As the Spanish Empire had lost much of its power, a no-transfer policy began with Jefferson whereby the U.S. respected Spanish sovereignty, considering the island's eventual absorption inevitable. The U.S. simply wanted to ensure that control did not pass to a stronger power such as Britain or France.

Cuba was of special importance to Southern Democrats, who believed their economic and political interests would be best served by the admission of another slave state to the Union. The existence of slavery in Cuba, the island's plantation economy based on sugar, and its geographical location predisposed it to Southern influence; its admission would greatly strengthen the position of Southern slaveholders, whose economic position was under threat from abolitionists. Whereas immigration to Northern industrial centers had resulted in Northern control of the population-based House of Representatives, Southern politicians sought to maintain the balance of power in the Senate, where each state received equal representation. As slavery-free Western states were admitted, Southern politicians increasingly looked to Cuba as the next slave state. If Cuba were admitted to the Union as a single state, the island at the time would have sent two senators and up to nine representatives to Washington. (Note: Cuba's population in 1850 was 651,223 white and free persons of color and 322,519 enslaved people. With slaves counting as three-fifths of a person for the purpose of Congressional representation, even though they had no votes and were not citizens, the population would have been considered 844,734 for determining Congressional apportionment. After the 1850 census, the ratio of congressman-to-constituent was 1:93,425, which would have yielded nine representatives for Cuba. Georgia had a similar population breakdown in the 1850 census (524,503 free; 381,682 enslaved; total for apportionment 753,512) and sent eight representatives to the 33rd United States Congress.)

In the Democratic Party, the debate over the continued expansion of the United States centered on how quickly, rather than whether, to expand. Radical expansionists and the Young America movement were quickly gaining traction by 1848, and a debate about whether to annex the Yucatán portion of Mexico that year included significant discussion of Cuba. Even John C. Calhoun, described as a reluctant expansionist who strongly disagreed with intervention on the basis of the Monroe Doctrine, concurred that "it is indispensable to the safety of the United States that this island should not be in certain hands", likely referring to Britain.

In light of a Cuban uprising, President James K. Polk refused solicitations from filibuster backer John L. O'Sullivan and stated his belief that any acquisition of the island must be an "amicable purchase". Under orders from Polk, Secretary of State James Buchanan prepared an offer of $100 million, but "sooner than see [Cuba] transferred to any power, [Spanish officials] would prefer seeing it sunk into the ocean". The Whig administrations of presidents Zachary Taylor and Millard Fillmore did not pursue the matter and took a harsher stand against filibusters such as Venezuelan Narciso López, with federal troops intercepting several expeditions bound for Cuba. When Franklin Pierce took office in 1853, however, he was committed to Cuba's annexation.

== The Pierce administration ==
At Pierce's presidential inauguration, he stated, "The policy of my Administration will not be controlled by any timid forebodings of evil from expansion." While slavery was not the stated goal nor Cuba mentioned by name, the antebellum makeup of his party required the Northerner to appeal to Southern interests, so he favored the annexation of Cuba as a slave state. To this end, he appointed expansionists to diplomatic posts throughout Europe, notably sending Pierre Soulé, an outspoken proponent of Cuban annexation, as United States Minister to Spain. The Northerners in his cabinet were fellow doughfaces (Northerners with Southern sympathies) such as Buchanan, who was made Minister to Great Britain after a failed bid for the presidency at the Democratic National Convention, and Secretary of State William L. Marcy, whose appointment was also an attempt to placate the "Old Fogies." This was the term for the wing of the party that favored slow, cautious expansion.

In March 1854, the steamer Black Warrior stopped at the Cuban port of Havana on a regular trading route from New York City to Mobile, Alabama. When it failed to provide a cargo manifest, Cuban officials seized the ship, its cargo, and its crew. The so-called Black Warrior Affair was viewed by Congress as a violation of American rights; a hollow ultimatum issued by Soulé to the Spanish to return the ship served only to strain relations, and he was barred from discussing Cuba's acquisition for nearly a year. While the matter was resolved peacefully, it fueled the flames of Southern expansionism.

Meanwhile, the doctrine of manifest destiny had become increasingly sectionalized as the decade progressed. While there were still Northerners who believed the United States should dominate the continent, most were opposed to Cuba's annexation, particularly as a slave state. Southern-backed filibusters, including Narciso López, had failed repeatedly since 1849 to 1851 to overthrow the colonial government despite considerable support among the Cuban people for independence, (Note: The actions of the filibusters violated U.S. neutrality laws, but Pierce's administration did not prosecute them as heavily as the Whig administrations that preceded him. Both expansionists and advocates of Cuban independence wanted the island to leave Spanish rule. López believed the sectional competition in the U.S. would prevent it from annexing Cuba and clear the way for Cuban independence. See Bemis (1965), pp. 313–317. For more information, see Brown (1980), Part I: "The Pearl of the Antilles".) and a series of reforms on the island made Southerners apprehensive that slavery would be abolished. They believed that Cuba would be "Africanized," as the majority of the population were slaves, and they had seen the Republic of Haiti established by former slaves. The notion of a pro-slavery invasion by the U.S. was rejected in light of the controversy over the Kansas–Nebraska Act. During internal discussions, supporters of gaining Cuba decided that a purchase or intervention in the name of national security was the most acceptable method of acquisition.

== Writing the Manifesto ==
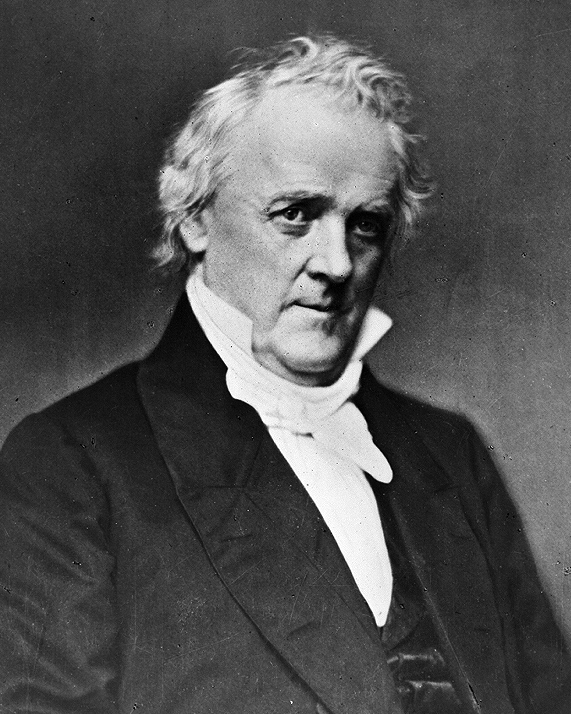
James Buchanan is believed to have authored the document.

Marcy suggested Soulé confer with Buchanan and John Y. Mason, Minister to France, on U.S. policy toward Cuba. He had previously written to Soulé that, if Cuba's purchase could not be negotiated, "you will then direct your effort to the next desirable object, which is to detach that island from the Spanish dominion and from all dependence on any European power"—words Soulé may have adapted to fit his own agenda. Authors David Potter and Lars Schoultz both note the considerable ambiguity in Marcy's cryptic words, and Samuel Bemis suggests he may have referred to Cuban independence, but acknowledges it is impossible to know Marcy's true intent. In any case, Marcy had also written in June that the administration had abandoned thoughts of declaring war over Cuba. But Robert May writes, "the instructions for the conference had been so vague, and so many of Marcy's letters to Soulé since the Black Warrior incident had been bellicose, that the ministers misread the administration's intent."

After a minor disagreement about their meeting site, the three American diplomats met in Ostend, Belgium from October 9–11, 1854, then adjourned to Aachen, Prussia, for a week to prepare a report of the proceedings. The resulting dispatch, which would come to be known as the Ostend Manifesto, declared that "Cuba is as necessary to the North American republic as any of its present members, and that it belongs naturally to that great family of states of which the Union is the Providential Nursery".

Prominent among the reasons for annexation outlined in the manifesto were fears of a possible slave revolt in Cuba parallel to the Haitian Revolution (1791–1804) in the absence of U.S. intervention. The Manifesto urged against inaction on the Cuban question, warning,

We should, however, be recreant to our duty, be unworthy of our gallant forefathers, and commit base treason against our posterity, should we permit Cuba to be Africanized and become a second St. Domingo (Haiti), with all its attendant horrors to the white race, and suffer the flames to extend to our own neighboring shores, seriously to endanger or actually to consume the fair fabric of our Union.

Racial fears raised tension and anxiety in the U.S. over a potential black uprising on the island that could "spread like wildfire" to the southern U.S. The Manifesto stated that the U.S. would be "justified in wresting" Cuba from Spain if the colonial power refused to sell it.

Soulé was a former U.S. Senator from Louisiana and member of the Young America movement, who sought a realization of American influence in the Caribbean and Central America. He is credited as the primary proponent of the policy expressed in the Ostend Manifesto. The experienced and cautious Buchanan is believed to have written the document and moderated Soulé's aggressive tone. Soulé highly favored expansion of Southern influence outside the current Union of States. His belief in Manifest Destiny led him to prophesy "absorption of the entire continent and its island appendages" by the U.S. Mason's Virginian roots predisposed him to the sentiments expressed in the document, but he later regretted his actions. Buchanan's exact motivations remain unclear despite his expansionist tendencies, but it has been suggested that he was seduced by visions of the presidency, which he would go on to win in 1856. One historian concluded in 1893, "When we take into account the characteristics of the three men we can hardly resist the conclusion that Soulé, as he afterwards intimated, twisted his colleagues round his finger."

To Marcy's chagrin, the flamboyant Soulé made no secret of the meetings. The press in both Europe and the U.S. were well aware of the proceedings if not their outcome, but were preoccupied with wars and midterm elections. In the latter case, the Democratic Party became a minority in the United States Congress, and editorials continued to chide the Pierce administration for its secrecy. At least one newspaper, the New York Herald, published what Brown calls "reports that came so close to the truth of the decisions at Ostend that the President feared they were based on leaks, as indeed they may have been". Pierce feared the political repercussions of confirming such rumors, and he did not acknowledge them in his State of the Union address at the end of 1854. The administration's opponents in the House of Representatives called for the document's release, and it was published in full four months after being written.

== Fallout ==
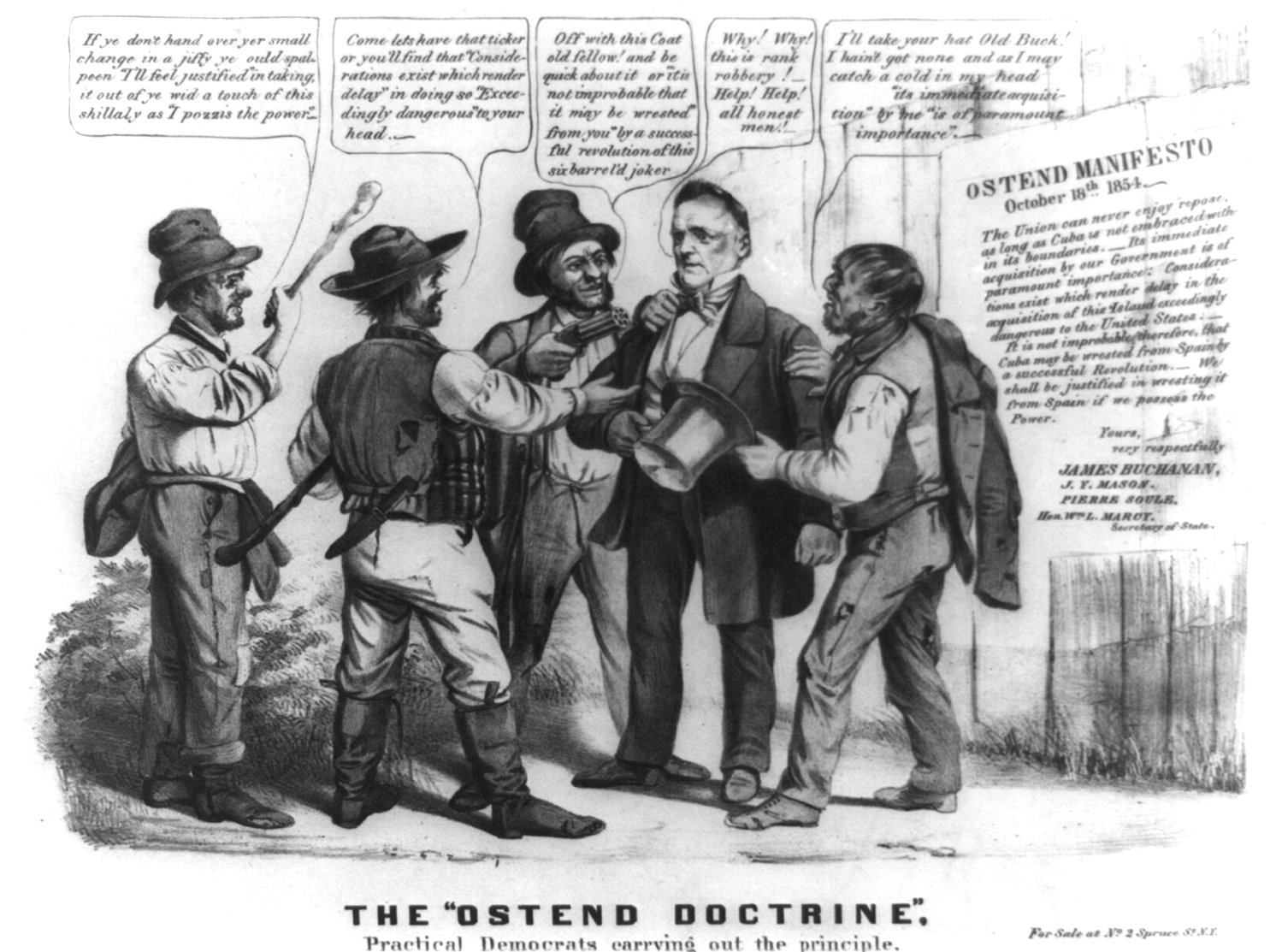
A political cartoon depicts James Buchanan surrounded by hoodlums using quotations from the Ostend Manifesto to justify robbing him. The caption below reads "The Ostend Doctrine".

When the document was published, Northerners were outraged by what they considered a Southern attempt to extend slavery. American free-soilers, recently angered by the strengthened Fugitive Slave Law (passed as part of the Compromise of 1850 and requiring officials of free states to cooperate in the return of slaves), decried as unconstitutional what Horace Greeley of the New York Tribune labeled "The Manifesto of the Brigands." During the period of Bleeding Kansas, as anti- and pro-slavery supporters fought for control of the state, the Ostend Manifesto served as a rallying cry for the opponents of the Slave Power. The incident was one of many factors that gave rise to the Republican Party, and the manifesto was criticized in the Party's first platform in 1856 as following a "highwayman's" philosophy of "might makes right." But, the movement to annex Cuba did not fully end until after the American Civil War.

The Pierce Administration was irreparably damaged by the incident. Pierce had been highly sympathetic to the Southern cause, and the controversy over the Ostend Manifesto contributed to the splintering of the Democratic Party. Internationally, it was seen as a threat to Spain and to imperial power across Europe. It was quickly denounced by national governments in Madrid, London, and Paris. To preserve what favorable relations the administration had left, Soulé was ordered to cease discussion of Cuba; he promptly resigned. The backlash from the Ostend Manifesto caused Pierce to abandon expansionist plans. It has been described as part of a series of "gratuitous conflicts ... that cost more than they were worth" for Southern interests intent on maintaining the institution of slavery.

Though officially repudiated by Marcy, the declaration ended any negotiations with Spain over the issue. In 1855 Spain shored up the defenses of Cuba and replaced all Criollo garrisons with Peninsulares more trusted to fight an American invasion. Spain also tried to revive a defensive alliance in the Caribbean that was proposed by Great Britain in the 1840s -- and rejected then by Spain -- but the British turned it down this time. Finally, the long-neglected Spanish Navy was improved and expanded considerably, acquiring 170 new vessels between 1856 and 1868, almost all of which were steamships. By 1860, Spain had created the fourth-most powerful navy in terms of total firepower and displacement after the British, French, and Italian navies. The U.S. Navy and Imperial Russian Navy had more ships total, but they consisted mostly of small vessels for coastal defense.

James Buchanan was easily elected president in 1856. Although he remained committed to Cuban annexation, he was hindered by popular opposition and the growing sectional conflict. In 1858, a new proposal to purchase Cuba was voted down both by the United States Congress and Spain's Cortes Generales. Maintaining control of Cuba was a primary concern of Spain in its decision to not join either side of the American Civil War. In 1861, the Confederate envoy to Havana, Charles J. Helm, unsuccessfully offered the end of any Southern ambitions over Cuba and a defensive alliance with Spain, in exchange for Spanish recognition of Southern independence.

In the United States, it was not until thirty years after the Civil War that the so-called Cuban Question again came to national prominence.

== See also ==
- Proposed United States annexation of Santo Domingo
- Cuba–United States relations
- Knights of the Golden Circle
- Spain–United States relations
- Platt Amendment

== Sources ==
- Bemis, Samuel Flagg (1965). A Diplomatic History of the United States. New York: Henry Holt and Company. OCLC 1310959.
- Brown, Charles Henry (1980). Agents of Manifest Destiny: The Lives and Times of the Filibusters. Chapel Hill: University of North Carolina Press. ISBN 0-8078-1361-3.
- Hershey, Amos S (May 1896). "The Recognition of Cuban Belligerency". Annals of the American Academy of Political and Social Science. 7 (3): 74–85. doi:10.1177/000271629600700304. hdl:2027/miun.agy6780.0001.003. S2CID 143364341.
- Henderson, Gavin B. (August 1939). "Southern Designs on Cuba, 1854–1857 and Some European Opinions". The Journal of Southern History. 5 (3): 371–385. doi:10.2307/2191501. JSTOR 2191501.
- Langley, Lester D. "Slavery, Reform, and American Policy in Cuba, 1823-1878." Revista de Historia de América (1968): 71–84. JSTOR 20138800.
- May, Robert E. (1973). The Southern Dream of a Caribbean Empire, 1854-1861. Baton Rouge: Louisiana State University Press. ISBN 0-8071-0051-X.
- Moore, J. Preston (May 1955). "Pierre Soule: Southern Expansionist and Promoter" (PDF). The Journal of Southern History. 21 (2): 203–223. doi:10.2307/2955118. JSTOR 2955118.
- Potter, David M. (1976). The Impending Crisis, 1848–1861. New York: Harper & Row. ISBN 0-06-131929-5.
- Rhodes, James Ford (1893). History of the United States from the Compromise of 1850, Vol. II: 1854–1860. New York: Harper & Bros. OCLC 272963.
- Schoultz, Lars (1998). Beneath the United States: A History of U.S. Policy Toward Latin America. Cambridge, MA: Harvard University Press. pp. 39–58. ISBN 978-0-674-04328-2.
- Sexton, Jay. "Toward a synthesis of foreign relations in the Civil War era, 1848–77." American Nineteenth Century History (2004) 5#3 pp. 50–73.
- Smith, Peter H. (April 1996). Talons of the Eagle: Dynamics of U.S.–Latin American Relations (2nd ed.). Oxford University Press, USA. pp. 392. ISBN 0-19-508303-2.
- Webster, Sidney. "Mr. Marcy, the Cuban Question and the Ostend Manifesto." Political Science Quarterly (1893) 8#1 pp: 1–32. JSTOR 2139870.
