= Solomon W. Downs =

American politician

Solomon Weathersbee Downs
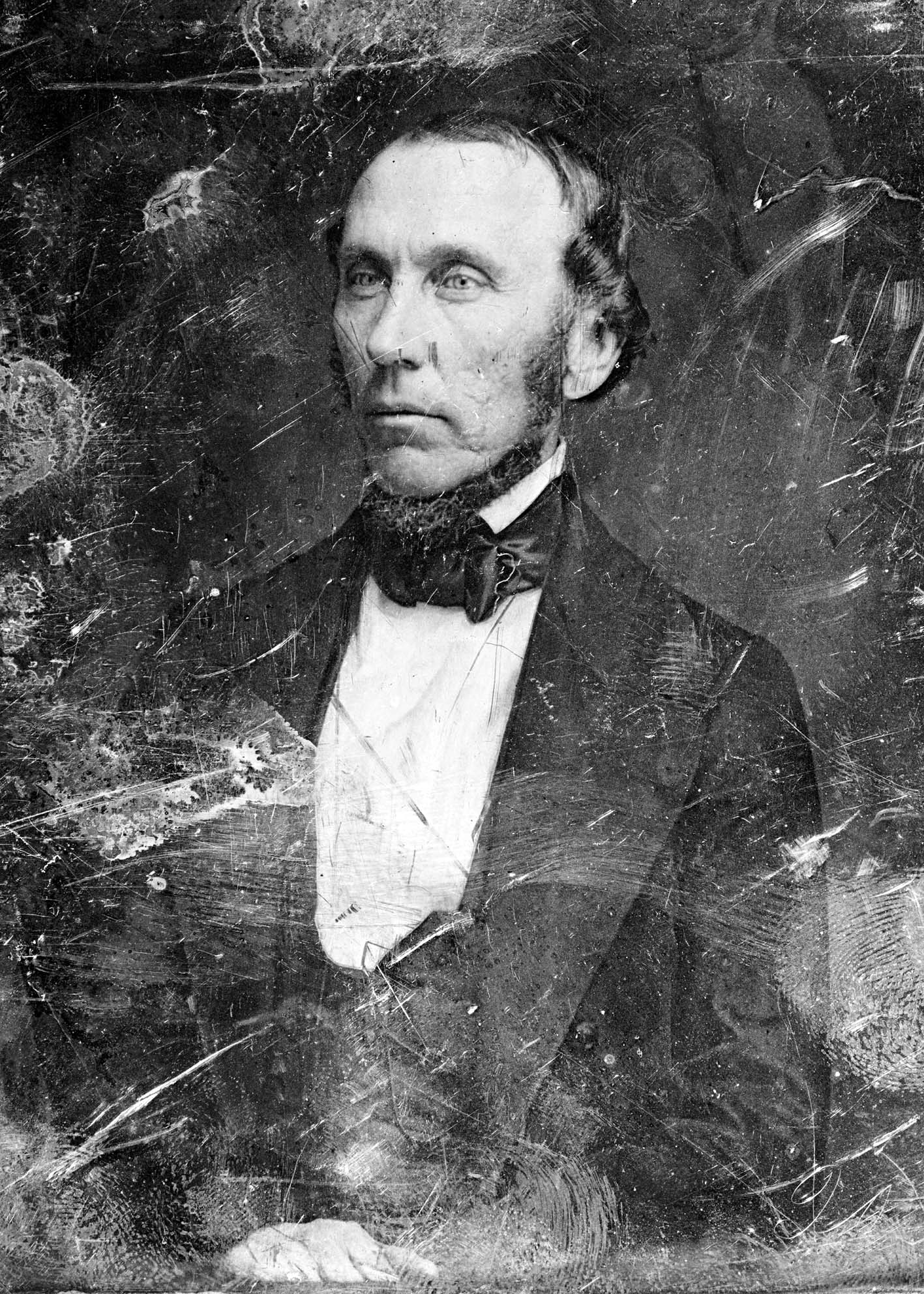
- In office March 4, 1847 – March 3, 1853
- Preceded by: Pierre Soulé
- Succeeded by: Judah P. Benjamin

United States Collector of Customs for the District of Orleans
- In office April 6, 1853 – August 13, 1854
- President: Franklin Pierce
- Preceded by: George C. Laurason
- Succeeded by: Thomas C. Porter

United States Attorney for the District of Louisiana
- In office April 26, 1845 – June 14, 1846
- President: James K. Polk
- Preceded by: Balie Peyton
- Succeeded by: Thomas J. Durant

Personal details
- Born: August 26, 1800 Montgomery County, Tennessee, U.S.
- Died: August 13, 1854 (aged 53) Lincoln County, Kentucky, U.S.
- Resting place: Riverview Cemetery, Monroe, Louisiana, US
- Party: Democratic
- Spouse: Ann Marie McCaleb
- Children: 2
- Education: Transylvania University
- Profession: Attorney

Solomon Weathersbee Downs (August 26, 1800 – August 13, 1854) was an American attorney, politician, and slaveholder from Louisiana. A Democrat, he served as a United States senator from 1847 to 1853.

The village of Downsville, Louisiana is named for him.

== Early life ==
Downs was born in Montgomery County, Tennessee, in 1801, the illegitimate son of William Weathersbee and Rebecca Downs. His family later moved to Louisiana, and sent Downs back to Tennessee to study under Thomas B. Craighead. He then attended Transylvania University in Lexington, Kentucky, from which he graduated in 1823. He studied law, was admitted to the bar in 1826 and commenced practice in Bayou Sara, Louisiana. He later moved to Ouachita, where he practiced law and owned and operated a plantation.

Downs enslaved dozens of African Americans on his two Ouachita Parish plantations. In the 1850 slave schedules, he is listed as holding a total of 154 men, women, and children in bondage.

== Career ==
A Democrat, he became active in politics as a campaign speaker on behalf of Andrew Jackson in 1828. In 1838, he won election to the Louisiana State Senate from Catahoula, Ouachita and Union Parishes, and he was reelected in 1842.

A longtime member of the Louisiana Militia, in 1842 Downs was appointed brigadier general of the organization's 6th Division.

In 1844 he was a delegate to the state constitutional convention. Also in 1844, he agreed to run for presidential elector as a supporter of Martin Van Buren. When Van Buren came out against annexing Texas, Downs resigned, but he agreed to run again after James K. Polk was nominated. Polk won the election and carried Louisiana, and Downs cast his ballot for the ticket of Polk for president and George M. Dallas for vice president.

Downs moved to New Orleans in 1845. He served as United States Attorney for the district of Louisiana from 1845 to 1846 and a member of the State constitutional convention.

He was elected as a Democrat to the U.S. Senate and served from March 4, 1847, to March 3, 1853. While in the Senate he was chairman of the Committee on Engrossed Bills (Thirtieth Congress) and the Committee on Private Land Claims (Thirtieth through Thirty-second Congresses).

In the Senate, Downs was an unusually staunch supporter of the institution of slavery, from which he personally profited. "I call upon the opponents of Slavery to prove that the white laborers of the North are as happy, as contented, or as comfortable as the slaves of the South," he said in one speech. "In the South the slaves do not suffer one tenth of the evils endured by the white laborers of the North...This, sir, is one of the excellencies of the system of Slavery, and this the superior condition of the Southern slave over the Northern white laborer."

After his term, he was appointed by President Franklin Pierce as United States Collector of Customs for the District of Orleans in 1853 and he served until his death.

== Death and burial ==
Downs died in Crab Orchard Springs, Kentucky on August 14, 1854, and was buried on his family's plantation in Kentucky. He was later reburied at Riverview Sanitarium in Monroe, Louisiana, and the burial ground there became Riverview Cemetery. Under the terms of his will, Downs freed a slave, Richard Barrington, who had been taught to read and write while living on Downs' plantation. Barrington later became a successful barber in New Orleans, and learned that Downs' grave had not been marked, so Barrington paid for a headstone. Downs' grave was later lost, and was uncovered again in 1937. After being moved to a spot near the cemetery entrance, the grave was forgotten about a second time. It was rediscovered in 2000, and is marked by the broken pieces of the headstone originally purchased by Barrington.

== Family ==
In 1830, Downs married Ann Marie McCaleb (d. 1857). They were the parents of two children, Samuel Alfred Downs and Sarah Mary Downs.

U.S. Senate
Preceded by Pierre Soulé	U.S. senator (Class 2) from Louisiana; March 4, 1847 – March 3, 1853; Served alongside: Henry Johnson and Pierre Soulé	Succeeded by Judah P. Benjamin
