= Castillon-en-Couserans =

Commune in Occitanie, France

- Commune
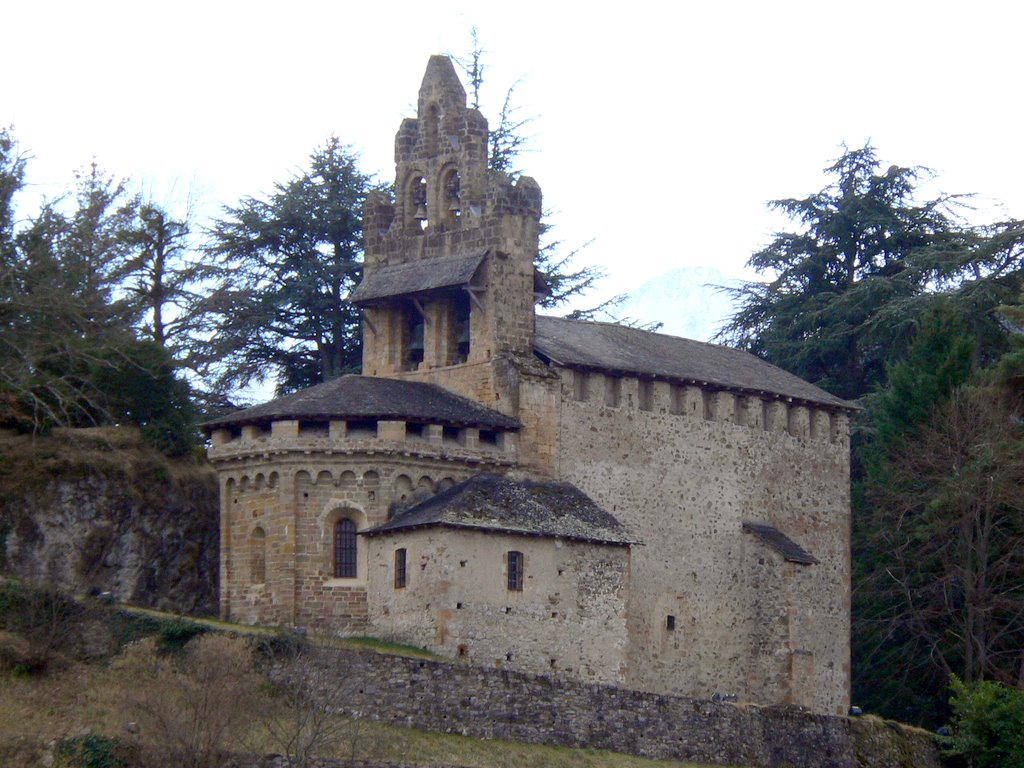
- The chapel in Castillon-en-Couserans

- Coat of arms
- Location of Castillon-en-Couserans
- Location within France Location within Occitanie
- Coordinates: 42°55′18″N 1°02′00″E
- Country: France
- Region: Occitania
- Department: Ariège
- Arrondissement: Saint-Girons
- Canton: Couserans Ouest
- Intercommunality: Couserans-Pyrénées

Government
  - Mayor (2020–2026): Patrick Timbart
- Area^{1}: 4.94 km^{2} (1.91 sq mi)
- Elevation: 537 m (1,762 ft)
- Highest elevation: 1,320 m (4,330 ft)
- Lowest elevation: 518 m (1,699 ft)
- Population (2023): 428
  - Density: 86.6/km^{2} (224/sq mi)
- Time zone: UTC+01:00 (CET)
  - Summer (DST): UTC+02:00 (CEST)
- INSEE/Postal code: 09085 /09800
- ^{1} French Land Register data, which excludes lakes, ponds, glaciers > 1 km^{2} (0.386 sq mi or 247 acres) and river estuaries.

Castillon-en-Couserans (French pronunciation: [kastijɔ̃ ɑ̃ kuzʁɑ̃], literally Castillon in Couserans; Occitan: Castilhon de Coserans) is a commune in the Ariège department in southwestern France.

== Personalities ==
Pierre Soulé (1801 – 1870), U.S. politician and diplomat, was born there.

== Population ==
Historical population
Year	Pop.	±% p.a.
1968	475	—
1975	429	−1.44%
1982	373	−1.98%
1990	403	+0.97%
1999	424	+0.57%
2007	398	−0.79%
2012	428	+1.46%
2017	400	−1.34%
2023	428	+1.13%
Source: INSEE

== See also ==
- Communes of the Ariège department
