= Slave Power =

Political force in the antebellum United States

The Slave Power, or Slavocracy, referred to the perceived political power held by American slaveholders in the federal government of the United States during the Antebellum period. Antislavery campaigners charged that this small group of wealthy slaveholders had seized political control of their states and were trying to take over the federal government illegitimately to expand and protect slavery. The claim was later used by the pre-Emancipation Republican Party of the 1850s that formed between 1854–55 to oppose the expansion of slavery.

The term was popularized by antislavery writers including Frederick Douglass, John Gorham Palfrey, Josiah Quincy III, Horace Bushnell, James Shepherd Pike, and Horace Greeley. Politicians who emphasized the theme included John Quincy Adams, Henry Wilson and William Pitt Fessenden.

== Background ==
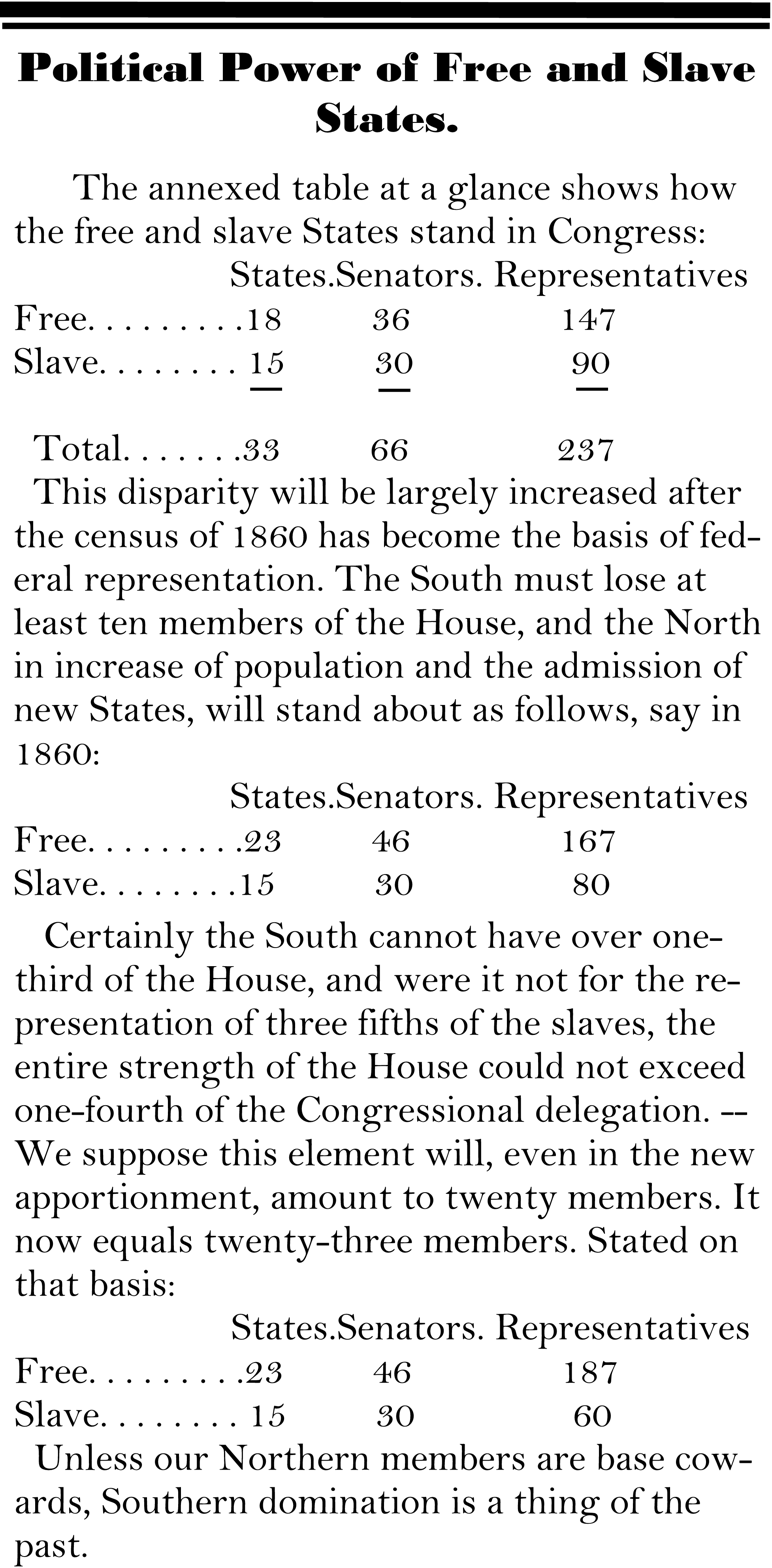
This reproduced clipping from an 1859 Ohio newspaper describes the imbalance in power between the slave states and free states.

The main issue expressed by the term slave power was distrust of the political power of the enslaving class. Such distrust was shared by many who were not abolitionists; those who were motivated more by a possible threat to the political balance or the impossibility of competing with unwaged enslaved labor than by concern over the treatment of enslaved people. Those who differed on many other issues (such as viewing blacks as inferior to whites or as being equal, or denouncing slavery as a sin or promising to guarantee its protection in the Deep South) could unite to attack the slavocracy. The "Free Soil" element emphasized that rich enslavers would move into new territory, use their cash to buy up all the good lands, then use enslaved people to work the lands, leaving little opportunity room for free farmers. By 1854, the Free Soil Party had largely merged into the new Republican Party.

The problem posed by slavery, according to many Northern politicians, was not so much the mistreatment of slaves (a theme that abolitionists emphasized), but rather the political threat to American republicanism, especially as embraced in Northern free states. The Free Soil Party first raised this warning in 1848, arguing that the annexation of Texas as a slave state was a terrible mistake. The Free Soilers' rhetoric was taken up by the Republican Party as it emerged in 1854.

The Republican Party also argued that slavery was economically inefficient, compared to free labor, and was a deterrent to the long-term modernization of America. Worse, said the Republicans, the Slave Power, deeply entrenched in the South, was systematically seizing control of the White House, the Congress, and the Supreme Court. Senator and governor Salmon P. Chase of Ohio was an articulate enemy of the Slave Power, as was Senator Charles Sumner of Massachusetts.

== Southern power ==
Southern power was derived from a combination of factors. The "three-fifths clause" (counting 100 slaves as 60 people for seats in the House and thus for electoral votes) gave the South disproportionate representation at the national level.

Parity in the Senate was critical, whereby a new slave state was admitted in tandem with a new free state. Regional unity across party lines was essential for key votes. In the Democratic Party, a presidential candidate had to carry the national convention by a two-thirds vote to be nominated. It was also essential for some Northerners—"Doughfaces"—to collaborate with the South, as in the debates surrounding the three-fifths clause itself in 1787, the Missouri Compromise of 1820, the gag rule in the House (1836–1844), and the wider subject of the Wilmot Proviso and slavery expansion in the Southwest after the Mexican war of 1846–1848. However, the North was adding population—and House seats—much faster than the South. With the Republicans gaining every year, the secession option became more and more attractive to the South. Secession was suicidal, as some leaders realized, and as John Quincy Adams had long prophesied. Secession, argued James Henry Hammond of South Carolina, reminded him of "the Japanese who when insulted rip open their own bowels." And yet, when secession came in 1860, Hammond followed. Historian Leonard Richards concludes, "It was men like Hammond who finally destroyed the Slave Power. Thanks to their leading the South out of the Union, seventy-two years of slaveholder domination came to an end."

== Threat to republicanism ==
From the point of view of many Northerners, the supposedly definitive Compromise of 1850 was followed by a series of maneuvers (such as the Kansas–Nebraska Act, the Dred Scott decision, etc.) in which the North gave up previously agreed gains without receiving anything in return, accompanied by ever-escalating and more extreme Southern demands. Many northerners who had no particular concern for blacks concluded that slavery was not worth preserving if its protection required destroying or seriously compromising democracy among whites. Such perceptions led to the Anti-Nebraska movement of 1854–1855, followed by the organized Republican Party.

== Opponents ==
Historian Frederick J. Blue (2006) explores the motives and actions of those who played supportive but not central roles in antislavery politics—those who undertook the humdrum work of organizing local parties, holding conventions, editing newspapers, and generally animating and agitating the discussion of issues related to slavery. They were a small but critical number of voices who, beginning in the late 1830s, battled the institution of slavery through political activism. In the face of great odds and powerful opposition, activists insisted that emancipation and racial equality could only be achieved through the political process. Representative activists include: Alvan Stewart, a Liberty party organizer from New York; John Greenleaf Whittier, a Massachusetts poet, journalist, and Liberty activist; Charles Henry Langston, an Ohio African-American educator; Owen Lovejoy, a congressman from Illinois, whose brother Elijah was killed by a pro-slavery mob; Sherman Booth, a journalist and Liberty organizer in Wisconsin; Jane Grey Swisshelm, a journalist in Pennsylvania and Minnesota; George W. Julian, a congressman from Indiana; David Wilmot, a congressman from Pennsylvania, whose Wilmot Proviso tried to stop the expansion of slavery in the Southwest; Benjamin Wade and Edward Wade, a senator and a congressman, respectively, from Ohio; and Jessie Benton Frémont of Missouri and California, wife of the Republican 1856 presidential nominee John C. Frémont.

== Impact of Democratic Free Soilers ==
The Democrats who rallied to Martin Van Buren's Free Soil Party in 1848 have been studied by Earle (2003). Their views on race occupied a wide spectrum, but they were able to fashion new and vital arguments against slavery and its expansion based on the Jacksonian Democracy's long-standing commitment to egalitarianism and hostility to centralized power. Linking their antislavery stance to a land-reform agenda that pressed for free land for poor settlers—realized by the Homestead Law of 1862—in addition to land free of slavery, Free Soil Democrats forced major political realignments in New York, New Hampshire, Massachusetts, and Ohio. Democratic politicians such as Wilmot, Marcus Morton, John Parker Hale, and even former president Van Buren were transformed into antislavery leaders. Many entered the new Republican party after 1854, bringing along Jacksonian ideas about property and political equality, helping transform antislavery from a struggling crusade into a mass political movement that came to power in 1860.

== House divided ==
In his celebrated "House Divided" speech of June 1858, Abraham Lincoln charged that Senator Stephen A. Douglas, President James Buchanan, his predecessor, Franklin Pierce, and Chief Justice Roger B. Taney were all part of a plot to nationalize slavery, as allegedly proven by the Supreme Court's Dred Scott decision of 1857.

Other Republicans pointed to the violence in Kansas, the brutal assault on Senator Sumner, attacks upon the abolitionist press, and efforts to take over Cuba (Ostend Manifesto) as evidence that the Slave Power was violent, aggressive, and expansive.

The only solution, Republicans insisted, was a new commitment to free labor, and a deliberate effort to stop any more territorial expansion of slavery. Northern Democrats answered that it was all an exaggeration and that the Republicans were paranoid. Their Southern colleagues spoke of secession, arguing that the John Brown raid of 1859 proved that the Republicans were ready to attack their region and destroy their way of life.

In congratulating President-elect Lincoln in 1860, Salmon P. Chase exclaimed, "The object of my wishes and labors for nineteen years is accomplished in the overthrow of the Slave Power", adding that the way was now clear "for the establishment of the policy of Freedom"—something that would come only after four destructive years of Civil War.

=== Cult of domesticity ===
Jessie Frémont, the wife of the first Republican presidential candidate, wrote campaign poetry for the 1856 election. Grant says her poems bind the period's cult of domesticity to the new party's emerging ideology. Her poems suggested that Northerners who conciliated the Slave Power were spreading their own sterility, while virile men voting Republican were reproducing, through their own redemption, a future free West. The code of domesticity, according to Grant, thus helped these poems to define collective political action as building upon the strengths of free labor.

=== Centralization ===
Historian Henry Brooks Adams (grandson of "Slave-Power" theorist John Quincy Adams) explained that the Slave Power was a force for centralization:

Between the slave power and states' rights there was no necessary connection. The slave power, when in control, was a centralizing influence, and all the most considerable encroachments on states' rights were its acts. The acquisition and admission of Louisiana; the Embargo; the War of 1812; the annexation of Texas "by joint resolution" [rather than treaty]; the war with Mexico, declared by the mere announcement of President Polk; the Fugitive Slave Law; the Dred Scott decision—all triumphs of the slave power—did far more than either tariffs or internal improvements, which in their origin were also Southern measures, to destroy the very memory of states' rights as they existed in 1789. Whenever a question arose of extending or protecting slavery, the slaveholders became friends of centralized power, and used that dangerous weapon with a kind of frenzy. Slavery in fact required centralization in order to maintain and protect itself, but it required to control the centralized machine; it needed despotic principles of government, but it needed them exclusively for its own use. Thus, in truth, states' rights were the protection of the free states, and as a matter of fact, during the domination of the slave power, Massachusetts appealed to this protecting principle as often and almost as loudly as South Carolina.

== Historiography ==
The existence of a Slave Power was dismissed by Southerners then and rejected by many historians of the 1920s and 1930s, who stressed the internal divisions in the South before 1850. Historian Allan Nevins contends that "nearly all groups ... steadily substituted emotion for reason.... Fear fed hatred, and hatred fed fear." The idea that the Slave Power existed has partly come back at the hands of neoabolitionist historians since 1970, and there is no doubt that it was a powerful factor in the Northern anti-slavery belief system. It was standard rhetoric for all factions of the Republican Party.

The Slave Power helped determine how the United States was perceived overseas for much of the 19th century. As Richard Henry Dana Jr. recalled in 1871:

There was scarce an American consul or political agent in any quarter of the globe, or on any island of the seas, who was not a supporter of the slave power.… Each embassy and consulate, the world over, was a centre of influences for slavery and against freedom. We ought to take this into account when we blame foreign nations for not accepting at once the United States as an antislavery power, bent on the destruction of slavery, as soon as our civil war broke out. For twenty years foreign merchants, shipmasters, or travellers had seen in American officials only trained and devoted supporters of the slave power, and the only evidences of public opinion at home to be found at those official seats… were all of the same character.

== See also ==
- All of Mexico Movement
- Golden Circle (proposed country)
- Ostend Manifesto
- Slavery in the United States
- Slavocracy
- Walker affair
