= Pierre Soulé =

French-born American politician (1801–1870)

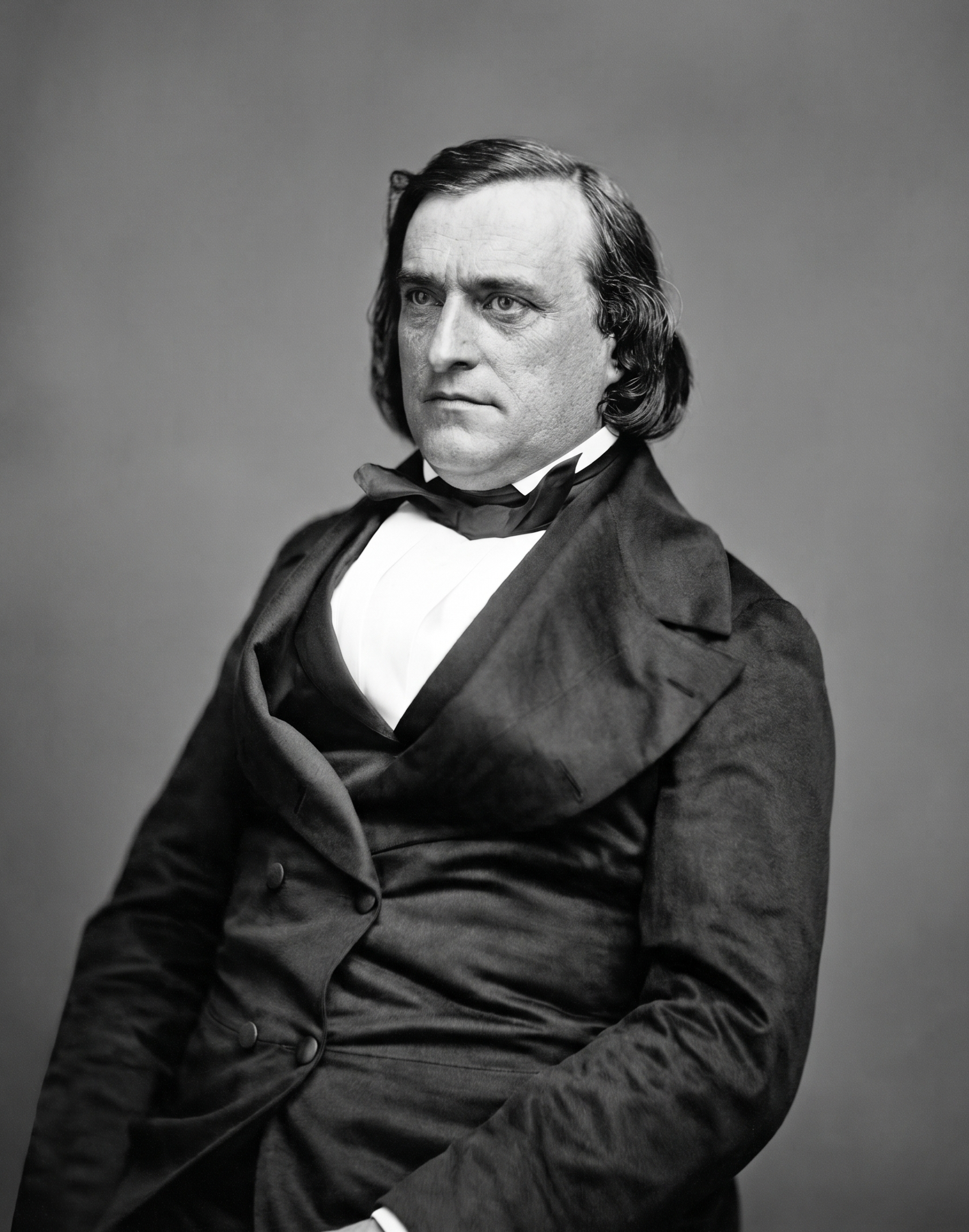

13th United States Minister to Spain
- In office April 7, 1853 – February 1, 1855
- President: Franklin Pierce
- Preceded by: Daniel M. Barringer
- Succeeded by: Augustus C. Dodge

United States Senator from Louisiana
- In office March 3, 1849 – April 11, 1853
- Preceded by: Henry Johnson
- Succeeded by: John Slidell
- In office January 21, 1847 – March 3, 1847
- Preceded by: Alexander Barrow
- Succeeded by: Solomon W. Downs

Personal details
- Born: August 31, 1801 Castillon-en-Couserans, France
- Died: March 26, 1870 (aged 68) New Orleans, Louisiana, U.S.
- Resting place: St. Louis Cemetery No. 2
- Party: Democratic
- Spouse: Henrietta Armantine Mercier (m. 1828–1859)
- Profession: Politician, Lawyer

Pierre Soulé (French: [pjɛʁ sule]; August 31, 1801 – March 26, 1870) was a French-born American attorney, politician, and diplomat in the mid-19th century. Serving as a U.S. Senator from Louisiana from 1849 to 1853, he was nominated that year as U.S. Minister to Spain, a post that he held until 1855.

He is likely best known for his role in writing the 1854 Ostend Manifesto, part of an attempt by Southern slaveholders to gain support for the U.S. to annex Cuba to the United States. Some Southern planters wanted to expand their territory to the Caribbean and into Central America. The Manifesto was roundly denounced, especially by anti-slavery elements, and Soulé was personally criticized for violating his diplomatic role.

Born and raised in southwest France, Soulé was exiled for revolutionary activities. He moved to Great Britain and then the United States, where he settled in New Orleans, became an attorney, and entered politics.

== Early life and education ==
Pierre Soulé was born in 1801 in Castillon-en-Couserans, a village in the French Pyrénées. His father was a prominent justice of the peace, and he was born into an educated family. He studied at a Jesuit college in Toulouse and at a Bordeaux academy. An anti-royalist in favor of freedom of conscience and secularism, he was exiled as a youth in 1816 to Navarre.

Soulé was later able to go to Paris to study law. After completing his studies, he passed the bar and began to practice law in the capital, Paris. He became involved in some secret societies working on civil rights. He published a newspaper, Le Nouveau nain jaune (The New Yellow Dwarf), whose title referred to a French fairy tale. Convicted of opposition to the government, he was sentenced to three years in prison but managed to escape.

== Emigration to the U.S. ==
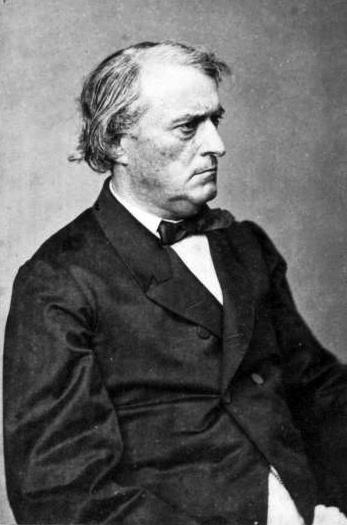
Pierre Soulé

In 1825 Soulé fled France by going first to Great Britain and then briefly to Haiti (formerly the French colony of Saint-Domingue). He was impressed by the new republic but had learned of the widespread massacres during the Haitian Revolution.

Soulé reached the U.S. at about age 25 and settled in New Orleans, Louisiana, the center of another former French colony. It still had a large ethnic French population, which commonly used the French language. There, he became a lawyer, married and had at least one son. After getting established, he became a naturalized citizen and founded a bank. However, there was a financial panic that disrupted the bank and so he returned to work about 1839 as an attorney for cotton planters and brokers. He was a founding member of The Boston Club.

== Political career ==
Soulé joined the Democratic Party and began to become active in politics. In 1844 he was a delegate to the state constitutional convention, and in 1846 he won election to the Louisiana State Senate.

In 1847, Soulé served briefly in the United States Senate as a Democrat elected by the state legislature to fill a vacancy in a special election. He was returned to the Senate for a full term, serving from 1849 to 1853.

He resigned to take an appointment as U.S. Minister to Spain, a post he held until 1855. Soulé contributed to the "tragicomic character of American diplomacy" in Europe during this period in that "He wounded the French ambassador in a duel, handed down an unauthorized ultimatum, and tried to pick a war with Spain over the Black Warrior affair. One critic observed that he was more of a matador than an ambassador." During this period, Soulé became known for writing the 1854 Ostend Manifesto, part of an attempt by Southern slaveholders of the planter class to gain support to annex Cuba to the United States. Worried about being bounded by free states to the north and west, some prominent Southerners wanted to expand their territory to the Caribbean and into Central America. Cuba still had legal slavery at the time. The Manifesto was roundly denounced in the U.S., especially by anti-slavery elements. Soulé was personally criticized for violating his role as a diplomat and Minister to Spain, which still controlled Cuba.

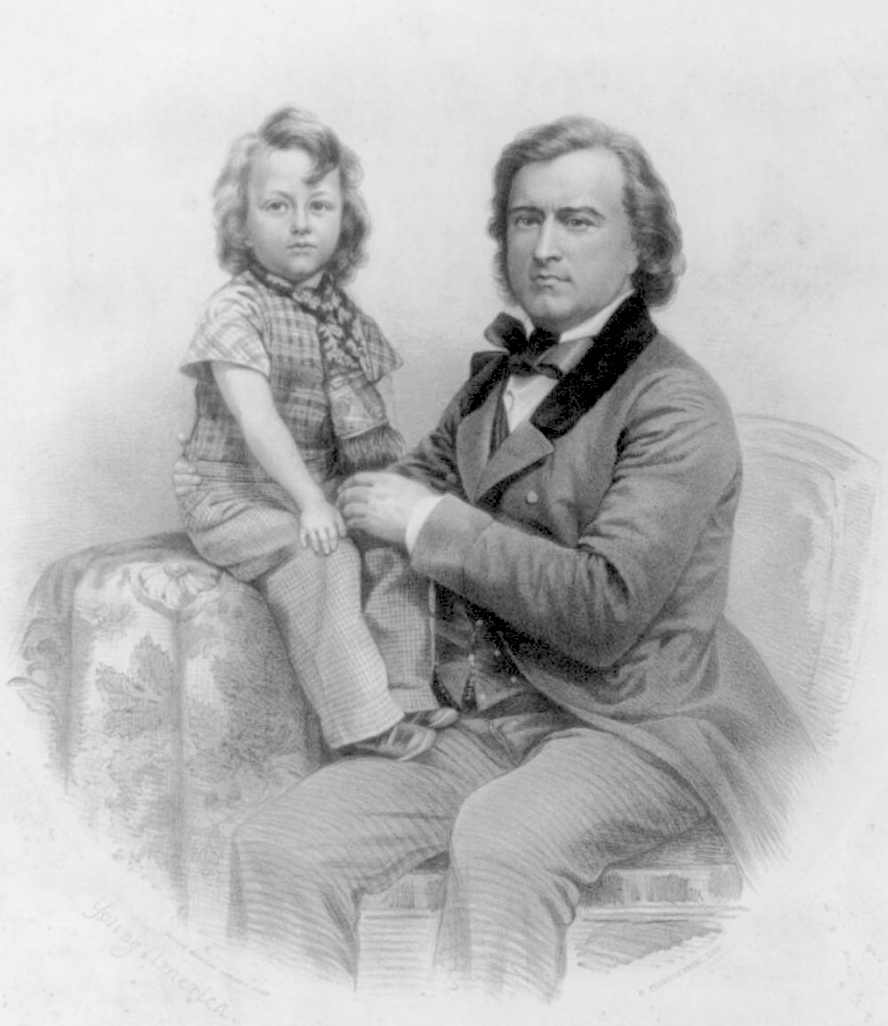
Pierre Soulé with son, 1853

In late 1852, while in Washington, D.C., Soulé had provided some support and assistance to the agent responsible for rescuing Solomon Northup, a free black from Saratoga Springs, New York, who had been kidnapped and sold into slavery. Northup was held as a slave for twelve years by planters in the Red River region, in Louisiana.

Soulé opposed Southern secession before the American Civil War. At the 1860 Democratic National Convention, he supported Stephen A. Douglas and the Unionist wing of the party against secessionist delegates, and in the subsequent 1860 presidential election, he was one of the few prominent politicians from the Deep South to campaign for Douglas. However, once the war began, he supported his state of Louisiana within the Confederacy. In 1861, he supported organizing the Allen Rifles which was Company 1 of the 26th Louisiana Infantry Regiment and gave an impassioned speech at a big barbecue in Thibodaux in Lafourche Parish.

== Civil War ==
On May 18, 1861, Soulé was captured by federal troops, charged with "plotting treason against the United States government," and imprisoned in Fort Warren, Massachusetts. Soulé escaped from the prison and was able to return to Confederate territory.

After the war ended in 1865, he went into exile in Havana, Cuba. Soulé later returned to the United States and died in New Orleans.

== See also ==
- Filibuster (military)
- Ostend Manifesto
- List of United States senators born outside the United States

== Sources ==
- United States Congress. "Pierre Soulé (id: S000682)". Biographical Directory of the United States Congress.
- Chancerel, Catherine. L'HOMME DU GRAND FLEUVE (The Man of the Great River), Paris: éditions du CNRS, 2014 (biography in French)
- Green, Jennifer R. and Patrick M. Kirkwood, "Reframing the Antebellum Democratic Mainstream: Transatlantic Diplomacy and the Career of Pierre Soulé," Civil War History 61, No. 3 (September 2015): 212–251.
- Moore, J. Preston. "Pierre Soule: Southern Expansionist and Promoter," Journal of Southern History, May 1955, Vol. 21 Issue 2, pp 203–223 doi:10.2307/2955118
- Parrish, T.M. (1992). Richard Taylor, Soldier Prince of Dixie. Richard Taylor: soldier prince of Dixie. University of North Carolina Press. ISBN 978-0-8078-2032-2.
- "Pierre Souleé : du Couserans à la Maison-Blanche", La Depeche, 6 April 2014
- Interview: Catherine Chancerel, Radio Couserans (in French)
- "La Vie de Pierre Soule" par Catherine Chancerel, La Depeche, 28 May 2015 (in French)
- "Une cousinade hors norme", La Depeche, 26 May 2015 (in French)

U.S. Senate
Preceded by Alexander Barrow	U.S. senator (Class 2) from Louisiana; January 21, 1847 – March 3, 1847; Served alongside: Henry Johnson	Succeeded by Solomon W. Downs
Preceded by Henry Johnson	U.S. senator (Class 3) from Louisiana; March 3, 1849 – April 11, 1853; Served alongside: Solomon W. Downs and Judah P. Benjamin	Succeeded by John Slidell
Diplomatic posts
Preceded by Daniel M. Barringer	United States Ambassador to Spain; April 7, 1853 – February 1, 1855	Succeeded by Augustus C. Dodge
