= Black Warrior Affair =

1854 political crisis between Spain and the United States

The Black Warrior affair was an 1854 incident touching trade and sovereignty between Spain and its American possessions and the United States.

Black Warrior, a ship in the American coastwise trade, touched at Havana, Cuba on February 28, 1854, on her eighteenth voyage to New York City. In technical conformity with law, but contrary to informal agreements, Cuban authorities demanded a cargo manifest. After a refusal, they seized and held the ship and cargo. The ship and cargo were restored to her owners on payment of a $6,000 fine, which was eventually remitted.

The controversy led to active discussions in the United States Congress and called forth able papers by Secretary of State William L. Marcy. However, the tactics of Pierre Soulé, American minister to Spain, temporarily threatened war. Linked somewhat with the Ostend Manifesto, the issue remained unresolved until August 1855, when Spain paid an indemnity of $53,000.
