= Political party strength in Kansas =

Politics in the US state of Kansas

== Partisan identification in the electorate ==
As of July 2025, Kansas's registered voters include 899,565 Republicans (45.1%), 498,451 Democrats (24.9%), 23,803 Libertarians (1.2%), 5,262 No Labels (0.3%), 822 United Kansas (0.04%), and 568,664 Unaffiliated (28.5%).

== State politics ==
The following table indicates the party of elected officials in the U.S. state of Kansas:

- Governor
- Lieutenant governor
- Secretary of state
- Attorney general
- State treasurer
- Insurance commissioner

The table also indicates the historical party composition in the:

- State Senate
- State House of Representatives
- State delegation to the U.S. Senate
- State delegation to the U.S. House of Representatives

For years in which a presidential election was held, the table indicates which party's nominees received the state's electoral votes.

=== Trifectas ===
The Populist Party held one trifecta following the 1896 election.

Governor George H. Hodges is the only Democratic governor of Kansas to serve with a Democratic House and Senate following the 1912 election.

All other governments since statehood have either been divided government or Republican trifectas.

== 1861–1974 ==
Year	Executive offices							State Legislature		United States Congress			Electoral votes
Year	Governor	Lieutenant Governor	Secretary of State	Attorney General	Treasurer	Insurance Comm.	Auditor	State Senate	State House	U.S. Senator (Class II)	U.S. Senator (Class III)	U.S. House	Electoral votes
1861	Charles L. Robinson (R) (Note: Impeached but acquitted of charges and was not removed from office.)	Joseph Pomeroy Root (R)	John W. Robinson (R) (Note: Elected in December 1859 in anticipation of statehood and sworn in after Kansas was admitted to the Union in February 1861. As a result of a bond scandal, was impeached on February 26, 1862, along with Governor Charles L. Robinson and state Auditor George S. Hillyer. Robinson was convicted by the state Senate on June 12, 1862 and removed from office, becoming the first state executive branch official to be impeached and removed from office in U.S. history.)	B. F. Simpson (R)	Hartwin R. Dutton (R)	post created 1871	George S. Hillyer (R)	22R, 3D	64R, 11D	Jim Lane (R) (Note: Died in office.)	Samuel C. Pomeroy (R)	Martin F. Conway (R)	
1861	Charles L. Robinson (R)	Joseph Pomeroy Root (R)	John W. Robinson (R)	Charles Chadwick (R)	Hartwin R. Dutton (R)	post created 1871	George S. Hillyer (R)	22R, 3D	64R, 11D	Jim Lane (R)	Samuel C. Pomeroy (R)	Martin F. Conway (R)	
1862	Charles L. Robinson (R)	Joseph Pomeroy Root (R)	Sanders R. Shepard (R) (Note: Succeeded to office on July 28, 1862.)	Samuel Stinson (D)	Hartwin R. Dutton (R)	post created 1871	David L. Lakin (I)	22R, 3D	64R, 11D	Jim Lane (R)	Samuel C. Pomeroy (R)	Martin F. Conway (R)	
1863	Thomas Carney (R)	Thomas A. Osborn (R)	Warren W. H. Lawrence (R)	Warren W. Guthrie (R)	William Spriggs (R)	post created 1871	Asa Hairgrove (R)	20R, 2D, 2I, 1ID	57R, 8D, 7U, 1I, 1Abol, 1?	Jim Lane (R)	Samuel C. Pomeroy (R)	A. Carter Wilder (R)	
1864	Thomas Carney (R)	Thomas A. Osborn (R)	Warren W. H. Lawrence (R)	Warren W. Guthrie (R)	William Spriggs (R)	post created 1871	Asa Hairgrove (R)	20R, 2D, 2I, 1ID	30R, 3D, 42?	Jim Lane (R)	Samuel C. Pomeroy (R)	A. Carter Wilder (R)	Lincoln/ Johnson (NU) ✓
1865	Samuel J. Crawford (R) (Note: Resigned to take command of the 19th Kansas Infantry.)	James McGrew (R)	Rinaldo A. Barker (R)	Jerome D. Brumbaugh (R)	William Spriggs (R)	post created 1871	John R. Swallow (R)	19R, 2I, 2NU, 1D, 1Nat	62R, 7D, 4Abol, 1I, 1IR, 1NU, 2?	Jim Lane (R)	Samuel C. Pomeroy (R)	Sidney Clarke (R)	Lincoln/ Johnson (NU) ✓
1866	Samuel J. Crawford (R)	James McGrew (R)	Rinaldo A. Barker (R)	Jerome D. Brumbaugh (R)	William Spriggs (R)	post created 1871	John R. Swallow (R)	19R, 2I, 2NU, 1D, 1Nat	61R, 10D, 1I, 1IR, 1NU, 1W, 3?	Jim Lane (R)	Samuel C. Pomeroy (R)	Sidney Clarke (R)	Lincoln/ Johnson (NU) ✓
1867	Samuel J. Crawford (R)	Nehemiah Green (R)	Rinaldo A. Barker (R)	George Henry Hoyt (R)	Martin Anderson (R)	post created 1871	John R. Swallow (R)	20R, 5D	69R, 13D	Edmund G. Ross (R)	Samuel C. Pomeroy (R)	Sidney Clarke (R)	Lincoln/ Johnson (NU) ✓
1868	Samuel J. Crawford (R)	Nehemiah Green (R)	Rinaldo A. Barker (R)	George Henry Hoyt (R)	Martin Anderson (R)	post created 1871	John R. Swallow (R)	20R, 5D	62R, 26D	Edmund G. Ross (R)	Samuel C. Pomeroy (R)	Sidney Clarke (R)	Grant/ Colfax (R) ✓
1868	Nehemiah Green (R) (Note: As lieutenant governor, filled unexpired term.)	vacant	Rinaldo A. Barker (R)	George Henry Hoyt (R)	Martin Anderson (R)	post created 1871	John R. Swallow (R)	20R, 5D	62R, 26D	Edmund G. Ross (R)	Samuel C. Pomeroy (R)	Sidney Clarke (R)	Grant/ Colfax (R) ✓
1869	James M. Harvey (R)	Charles V. Eskridge (R)	Thomas Moonlight (R)	Addison Danford (R)	George Graham (R)	post created 1871	Alois Thoman (R)	24R, 1D	84R, 6D	Edmund G. Ross (R)	Samuel C. Pomeroy (R)	Sidney Clarke (R)	Grant/ Colfax (R) ✓
1870	James M. Harvey (R)	Charles V. Eskridge (R)	Thomas Moonlight (R)	Addison Danford (R)	George Graham (R)	post created 1871	Alois Thoman (R)	24R, 1D	R majority	Edmund G. Ross (R)	Samuel C. Pomeroy (R)	Sidney Clarke (R)	Grant/ Colfax (R) ✓
1871	James M. Harvey (R)	P. P. Elder (R)	William H. Smallwood (R)	Archibald L. Williams (R)	Josiah E. Hayes (R)	William C. Webb (R)	Alois Thoman (R)	25R	82R, 16D	Alexander Caldwell (R)	Samuel C. Pomeroy (R)	David P. Lowe (R)	Grant/ Colfax (R) ✓
1872	James M. Harvey (R)	P. P. Elder (R)	William H. Smallwood (R)	Archibald L. Williams (R)	Josiah E. Hayes (R)	William C. Webb (R)	Alois Thoman (R)	25R	R majority	Alexander Caldwell (R)	Samuel C. Pomeroy (R)	David P. Lowe (R)	Grant/ Wilson (R) ✓
1873	Thomas A. Osborn (R)	Elias S. Stover (R)	William H. Smallwood (R)	Archibald L. Williams (R)	Josiah E. Hayes (R)	Edward Russell (R)	Daniel W. Wilder (R)	27R, 5FA, 1D	51R, 34FA, 18I, 2D	Robert Crozier (R)	John J. Ingalls (R)	3R	Grant/ Wilson (R) ✓
1874	Thomas A. Osborn (R)	Elias S. Stover (R)	William H. Smallwood (R)	Archibald L. Williams (R)	Samuel Lappin (R)	Harrison Clarkson (R)	Daniel W. Wilder (R)	27R, 5FA, 1D	57R, 18Ref, 13I, (Note: Includes 2 Independent Republicans, and 1 Liberal Independent.) 9FA, 4Lib, 3D, 2?, 1 vac.	James M. Harvey (R)	John J. Ingalls (R)	3R	Grant/ Wilson (R) ✓
1875	Thomas A. Osborn (R)	Melville J. Salter (R) (Note: Resigned July 10, 1877.)	Thomas H. Cavanaugh (R)	Asa M. F. Randolph (R)	John Francis (R)	Orrin T. Welch (R)	Daniel W. Wilder (R)	20R, 9Ref, 3D, 1LR	75R, 20Ref, 10D, 2?	James M. Harvey (R)	John J. Ingalls (R)	2R, 1D	Grant/ Wilson (R) ✓
1876	Thomas A. Osborn (R)	Melville J. Salter (R)	Thomas H. Cavanaugh (R)	Asa M. F. Randolph (R)	John Francis (R)	Orrin T. Welch (R)	Daniel W. Wilder (R)	20R, 9Ref, 3D, 1LR	77R, 9D, 13I, (Note: Includes 4 Independent Republicans.) 4IR, 3Ref, 1RefR, 1?	James M. Harvey (R)	John J. Ingalls (R)	2R, 1D	Hayes/ Wheeler (R) ✓
1877	George T. Anthony (R)	Melville J. Salter (R)	Thomas H. Cavanaugh (R)	Willard Davis (R)	John Francis (R)	Orrin T. Welch (R)	Parkinson I. Bonebrake (R)	35R, 5D	107R, 18D	Preston B. Plumb (R)	John J. Ingalls (R)	3R	Hayes/ Wheeler (R) ✓
1877	George T. Anthony (R)	Lyman U. Humphrey (R) (Note: Elected November 6, 1877, to fill vacancy.)	Thomas H. Cavanaugh (R)	Willard Davis (R)	John Francis (R)	Orrin T. Welch (R)	Parkinson I. Bonebrake (R)	35R, 5D	107R, 18D	Preston B. Plumb (R)	John J. Ingalls (R)	3R	Hayes/ Wheeler (R) ✓
1878	George T. Anthony (R)	Lyman U. Humphrey (R)	Thomas H. Cavanaugh (R)	Willard Davis (R)	John Francis (R)	Orrin T. Welch (R)	Parkinson I. Bonebrake (R)	35R, 5D	107R, 18D	Preston B. Plumb (R)	John J. Ingalls (R)	3R	Hayes/ Wheeler (R) ✓
1879	John St. John (R)	Lyman U. Humphrey (R)	James Smith (R)	Willard Davis (R)	John Francis (R)	Orrin T. Welch (R)	Parkinson I. Bonebrake (R)	35R, 5D	108R, 17D	Preston B. Plumb (R)	John J. Ingalls (R)	3R	Hayes/ Wheeler (R) ✓
1880	John St. John (R)	Lyman U. Humphrey (R)	James Smith (R)	Willard Davis (R)	John Francis (R)	Orrin T. Welch (R)	Parkinson I. Bonebrake (R)	35R, 5D	108R, 17D	Preston B. Plumb (R)	John J. Ingalls (R)	3R	Garfield/ Arthur (R) ✓
1881	John St. John (R)	David Finney (R)	James Smith (R)	William Agnew Johnston (R)	John Francis (R)	Orrin T. Welch (R)	Parkinson I. Bonebrake (R)	37R, 2D, 1Fus	112R, 9D, 4Fus	Preston B. Plumb (R)	John J. Ingalls (R)	3R	Garfield/ Arthur (R) ✓
1882	John St. John (R)	David Finney (R)	James Smith (R)	William Agnew Johnston (R)	John Francis (R)	Orrin T. Welch (R)	Parkinson I. Bonebrake (R)	37R, 2D, 1Fus	112R, 9D, 4Fus	Preston B. Plumb (R)	John J. Ingalls (R)	3R	Garfield/ Arthur (R) ✓
1883	George Washington Glick (D)	David Finney (R)	James Smith (R)	William Agnew Johnston (R)	Samuel T. Howe (R)	Richard B. Morris (D)	Edward P. McCabe (R)	37R, 2D, 1Fus	86R, 26D, 13GB	Preston B. Plumb (R)	John J. Ingalls (R)	7R	Garfield/ Arthur (R) ✓
1884	George Washington Glick (D)	David Finney (R)	James Smith (R)	George P. Smith (D)	Samuel T. Howe (R)	Richard B. Morris (D)	Edward P. McCabe (R)	37R, 2D, 1Fus	86R, 26D, 13GB	Preston B. Plumb (R)	John J. Ingalls (R)	7R	Blaine/ Logan (R) ✗
1885	John Martin (R)	Alexander P. Riddle (R)	Edwin B. Allen (R)	Simon B. Bradford (R)	Samuel T. Howe (R)	Richard B. Morris (D)	Edward P. McCabe (R)	37R, 3D	107R, 11D, 7I	Preston B. Plumb (R)	John J. Ingalls (R)	7R	Blaine/ Logan (R) ✗
1886	John Martin (R)	Alexander P. Riddle (R)	Edwin B. Allen (R)	Simon B. Bradford (R)	Samuel T. Howe (R)	Richard B. Morris (D)	Edward P. McCabe (R)	37R, 3D	107R, 11D, 7I	Preston B. Plumb (R)	John J. Ingalls (R)	7R	Blaine/ Logan (R) ✗
1887	John Martin (R)	Alexander P. Riddle (R)	Edwin B. Allen (R)	Simon B. Bradford (R)	James W. Hamilton (R)	Daniel W. Wilder (R)	Timothy McCarthy (R)	37R, 3D	97R, 24D, 3I, 1Lab	Preston B. Plumb (R)	John J. Ingalls (R)	6R, 1IR	Blaine/ Logan (R) ✗
1888	John Martin (R)	Alexander P. Riddle (R)	Edwin B. Allen (R)	Simon B. Bradford (R)	James W. Hamilton (R)	Daniel W. Wilder (R)	Timothy McCarthy (R)	37R, 3D	97R, 24D, 3I, 1Lab	Preston B. Plumb (R)	John J. Ingalls (R)	6R, 1IR	Harrison/ Morton (R) ✓
1889	Lyman U. Humphrey (R)	Andrew Jackson Felt (R)	William Higgins (R)	Lyman Beecher Kellogg (R)	James W. Hamilton (R)	Daniel W. Wilder (R)	Timothy McCarthy (R)	39R, 1D	121R, 2D, 2UL	Preston B. Plumb (R)	John J. Ingalls (R)	7R	Harrison/ Morton (R) ✓
1890	Lyman U. Humphrey (R)	Andrew Jackson Felt (R)	William Higgins (R)	Lyman Beecher Kellogg (R)	William Sims (R)	Daniel W. Wilder (R)	Timothy McCarthy (R)	39R, 1D	121R, 2D, 2UL	Preston B. Plumb (R)	John J. Ingalls (R)	7R	Harrison/ Morton (R) ✓
1891	Lyman U. Humphrey (R)	Andrew Jackson Felt (R)	William Higgins (R)	John Nutt Ives (D)	Solomon G. Stover (R)	W. H. McBride (R)	Charles M. Hovey (R)	39R, 1D	92FA, 26R, 7D	Preston B. Plumb (R)	William A. Peffer (Pop)	5Pop, 2R	Harrison/ Morton (R) ✓
1892	Lyman U. Humphrey (R)	Andrew Jackson Felt (R)	William Higgins (R)	John Nutt Ives (D)	Solomon G. Stover (R)	W. H. McBride (R)	Charles M. Hovey (R)	39R, 1D	92FA, 26R, 7D	Bishop W. Perkins (R)	William A. Peffer (Pop)	5Pop, 2R	Weaver/ Field (Pop) ✗
1893	Lorenzo D. Lewelling (Pop)	Percy Daniels (Pop)	Russell S. Osborn (Pop)	John T. Little (Pop)	William H. Biddle (Pop)	S. H. Snider (R)	Van B. Prather (Pop)	23Pop, 15R, 2D	64R, 58Pop, 2D, 1I	John Martin (D)	William A. Peffer (Pop)	5Pop, 2R, 1D	Weaver/ Field (Pop) ✗
1894	Lorenzo D. Lewelling (Pop)	Percy Daniels (Pop)	Russell S. Osborn (Pop)	John T. Little (Pop)	William H. Biddle (Pop)	S. H. Snider (R)	Van B. Prather (Pop)	23Pop, 15R, 2D	64R, 58Pop, 2D, 1I	John Martin (D)	William A. Peffer (Pop)	5Pop, 2R, 1D	Weaver/ Field (Pop) ✗
1895	Edmund N. Morrill (R)	James A. Troutman (R)	William C. Edwards (R)	Fernando B. Dawes (R)	Otis L. Atherton (R)	George T. Anthony (R)	George E. Cole (R)	23Pop, 15R, 2D	91R, 33Pop, 1D	Lucien Baker (R)	William A. Peffer (Pop)	7R, 1Pop	Weaver/ Field (Pop) ✗
1896	Edmund N. Morrill (R)	James A. Troutman (R)	William C. Edwards (R)	Fernando B. Dawes (R)	Otis L. Atherton (R)	Alexander P. Riddle (R)	George E. Cole (R)	23Pop, 15R, 2D	91R, 33Pop, 1D	Lucien Baker (R)	William A. Peffer (Pop)	7R, 1Pop	Bryan/ Sewall (D) ✗
1897	John W. Leedy (Pop)	Alexander Miller Harvey (Pop)	William E. Bush (Pop)	Louis C. Boyle (Pop)	David Heflebower (Pop)	Webb McNall (Pop)	William H. Morris (Pop)	27Pop, 11R, 2D	67Pop, 47R, 8D, 3SvR	Lucien Baker (R)	William A. Harris (Pop)	6Pop, 2R	Bryan/ Sewall (D) ✗
1898	John W. Leedy (Pop)	Alexander Miller Harvey (Pop)	William E. Bush (Pop)	Louis C. Boyle (Pop)	David Heflebower (Pop)	Webb McNall (Pop)	William H. Morris (Pop)	27Pop, 11R, 2D	67Pop, 47R, 8D, 3SvR	Lucien Baker (R)	William A. Harris (Pop)	6Pop, 2R	Bryan/ Sewall (D) ✗
1899	William Eugene Stanley (R)	Harry E. Richter (R)	George A. Clark (R)	Aretas A. Godard (R)	Frank Grimes (R)	Willard V. Church (R)	George E. Cole (R)	27Pop, 11R, 2D	92R, 33Pop	Lucien Baker (R)	William A. Harris (Pop)	7R, 1Pop	Bryan/ Sewall (D) ✗
1900	William Eugene Stanley (R)	Harry E. Richter (R)	George A. Clark (R)	Aretas A. Godard (R)	Frank Grimes (R)	Willard V. Church (R)	George E. Cole (R)	27Pop, 11R, 2D	92R, 33Pop	Lucien Baker (R)	William A. Harris (Pop)	7R, 1Pop	McKinley/ Roosevelt (R) ✓
1901	William Eugene Stanley (R)	Harry E. Richter (R)	George A. Clark (R)	Aretas A. Godard (R)	Frank Grimes (R)	Willard V. Church (R)	George E. Cole (R)	31R, 7Pop, 2D	81R, 30Pop, 12D, 2SvR	Joseph R. Burton (R)	William A. Harris (Pop)	7R, 1D	McKinley/ Roosevelt (R) ✓
1902	William Eugene Stanley (R)	Harry E. Richter (R)	George A. Clark (R)	Aretas A. Godard (R)	Frank Grimes (R)	Willard V. Church (R)	George E. Cole (R)	31R, 7Pop, 2D	81R, 30Pop, 12D, 2SvR	Joseph R. Burton (R)	William A. Harris (Pop)	7R, 1D	McKinley/ Roosevelt (R) ✓
1903	Willis J. Bailey (R)	David J. Hanna (R)	Joel R. Burrow (R)	Chiles C. Coleman (R)	Thomas Kelly (R)	Charles H. Luling (R)	Seth G. Wells (R)	31R, 7Pop, 2D	95R, 30D	Joseph R. Burton (R)	Chester I. Long (R)	8R	McKinley/ Roosevelt (R) ✓
1904	Willis J. Bailey (R)	David J. Hanna (R)	Joel R. Burrow (R)	Chiles C. Coleman (R)	Thomas Kelly (R)	Charles H. Luling (R)	Seth G. Wells (R)	31R, 7Pop, 2D	95R, 30D	Joseph R. Burton (R)	Chester I. Long (R)	8R	Roosevelt/ Fairbanks (R) ✓
1905	Edward W. Hoch (R)	David J. Hanna (R)	Joel R. Burrow (R)	Chiles C. Coleman (R)	Thomas Kelly (R)	Charles H. Luling (R)	Seth G. Wells (R)	37R, 3D	110R, 15D	Joseph R. Burton (R)	Chester I. Long (R)	8R	Roosevelt/ Fairbanks (R) ✓
1906	Edward W. Hoch (R)	David J. Hanna (R)	Joel R. Burrow (R)	Chiles C. Coleman (R)	Thomas Kelly (R)	Charles H. Luling (R)	Seth G. Wells (R)	37R, 3D	110R, 15D	Alfred W. Benson (R)	Chester I. Long (R)	8R	Roosevelt/ Fairbanks (R) ✓
1907	Edward W. Hoch (R)	W. J. Fitzgerald (R)	Charles E. Denton (R)	Fred S. Jackson (R)	Mark Tulley (R)	Charles W. Barnes (R)	James M. Nation (R)	37R, 3D	94R, 31D	Charles Curtis (R)	Chester I. Long (R)	8R	Roosevelt/ Fairbanks (R) ✓
1908	Edward W. Hoch (R)	W. J. Fitzgerald (R)	Charles E. Denton (R)	Fred S. Jackson (R)	Mark Tulley (R)	Charles W. Barnes (R)	James M. Nation (R)	37R, 3D	94R, 31D	Charles Curtis (R)	Chester I. Long (R)	8R	Taft/ Sherman (R) ✓
1909	Walter R. Stubbs (R)	W. J. Fitzgerald (R)	Charles E. Denton (R)	Fred S. Jackson (R)	Mark Tulley (R)	Charles W. Barnes (R)	James M. Nation (R)	34R, 6D	84R, 40D, 1I	Charles Curtis (R)	Joseph L. Bristow (R)	8R	Taft/ Sherman (R) ✓
1910	Walter R. Stubbs (R)	W. J. Fitzgerald (R)	Charles E. Denton (R)	Fred S. Jackson (R)	Mark Tulley (R)	Charles W. Barnes (R)	James M. Nation (R)	34R, 6D	84R, 40D, 1I	Charles Curtis (R)	Joseph L. Bristow (R)	8R	Taft/ Sherman (R) ✓
1911	Walter R. Stubbs (R)	Richard Joseph Hopkins (R)	Charles H. Sessions (R)	John Shaw Dawson (R)	Mark Tulley (R)	Isaac S. Lewis (R)	William E. Davis (R)	34R, 6D	71R, 53D, 1I	Charles Curtis (R)	Joseph L. Bristow (R)	8R	Taft/ Sherman (R) ✓
1912	Walter R. Stubbs (R)	Richard Joseph Hopkins (R)	Charles H. Sessions (R)	John Shaw Dawson (R)	Mark Tulley (R)	Isaac S. Lewis (R)	William E. Davis (R)	34R, 6D	71R, 53D, 1I	Charles Curtis (R)	Joseph L. Bristow (R)	8R	Wilson/ Marshall (D) ✓
1913	George H. Hodges (D)	Sheffield Ingalls (R)	Charles H. Sessions (R)	John Shaw Dawson (R)	Earl Akers (R)	Isaac S. Lewis (R)	William E. Davis (R)	21D, 18R, 1Soc	72D, 51R, 2Soc	William H. Thompson (D)	Joseph L. Bristow (R)	5D, 3R	Wilson/ Marshall (D) ✓
1914	George H. Hodges (D)	Sheffield Ingalls (R)	Charles H. Sessions (R)	John Shaw Dawson (R)	Earl Akers (R)	Isaac S. Lewis (R)	William E. Davis (R)	21D, 18R, 1Soc	72D, 51R, 2Soc	William H. Thompson (D)	Joseph L. Bristow (R)	5D, 3R	Wilson/ Marshall (D) ✓
1915	Arthur Capper (R)	William Y. Morgan (R)	John T. Botkin (R)	Sardius M. Brewster (R)	Earl Akers (R)	Carey J. Wilson (R)	William E. Davis (R)	21D, 18R, 1Soc	66R, 49D, 9Prog, 1Soc	William H. Thompson (D)	Charles Curtis (R)	6D, 2R	Wilson/ Marshall (D) ✓
1916	Arthur Capper (R)	William Y. Morgan (R)	John T. Botkin (R)	Sardius M. Brewster (R)	Earl Akers (R)	Carey J. Wilson (R)	William E. Davis (R)	21D, 18R, 1Soc	66R, 49D, 9Prog, 1Soc	William H. Thompson (D)	Charles Curtis (R)	6D, 2R	Wilson/ Marshall (D) ✓
1917	Arthur Capper (R)	William Y. Morgan (R)	John T. Botkin (R)	Sardius M. Brewster (R)	Walter Payne (R)	Carey J. Wilson (R)	Fred W. Knapp (R)	31R, 9D	86R, 37D, 2Soc	William H. Thompson (D)	Charles Curtis (R)	5D, 3R	Wilson/ Marshall (D) ✓
1918	Arthur Capper (R)	William Y. Morgan (R)	John T. Botkin (R)	Sardius M. Brewster (R)	Walter Payne (R)	Carey J. Wilson (R)	Fred W. Knapp (R)	31R, 9D	86R, 37D, 2Soc	William H. Thompson (D)	Charles Curtis (R)	5D, 3R	Wilson/ Marshall (D) ✓
1919	Henry J. Allen (R)	Charles S. Huffman (R)	Lewis J. Pettijohn (R)	Richard Joseph Hopkins (R)	Walter Payne (R)	Frank L. Travis (R)	Fred W. Knapp (R)	31R, 9D	110R, 15D	Arthur Capper (R)	Charles Curtis (R)	7R, 1D	Wilson/ Marshall (D) ✓
1920	Henry J. Allen (R)	Charles S. Huffman (R)	Lewis J. Pettijohn (R)	Richard Joseph Hopkins (R)	Walter Payne (R)	Frank L. Travis (R)	Fred W. Knapp (R)	31R, 9D	110R, 15D	Arthur Capper (R)	Charles Curtis (R)	7R, 1D	Harding/ Coolidge (R) ✓
1921	Henry J. Allen (R)	Charles S. Huffman (R)	Lewis J. Pettijohn (R)	Richard Joseph Hopkins (R)	E. T. Thompson (R)	Frank L. Travis (R)	N. A. Turner (R)	38R, 2D	113R, 12D	Arthur Capper (R)	Charles Curtis (R)	8R	Harding/ Coolidge (R) ✓
1922	Henry J. Allen (R)	Charles S. Huffman (R)	David O. McCray (R)	Richard Joseph Hopkins (R)	E. T. Thompson (R)	Frank L. Travis (R)	N. A. Turner (R)	38R, 2D	113R, 12D	Arthur Capper (R)	Charles Curtis (R)	8R	Harding/ Coolidge (R) ✓
1923	Jonathan M. Davis (D)	Benjamin S. Paulen (R)	Frank J. Ryan (R)	Charles Benjamin Griffith (R)	E. T. Thompson (R)	William R. Baker (R)	N. A. Turner (R)	38R, 2D	95R, 30D	Arthur Capper (R)	Charles Curtis (R)	7R, 1D	Harding/ Coolidge (R) ✓
1924	Jonathan M. Davis (D)	Benjamin S. Paulen (R)	Frank J. Ryan (R)	Charles Benjamin Griffith (R)	E. T. Thompson (R)	William R. Baker (R)	N. A. Turner (R)	38R, 2D	95R, 30D	Arthur Capper (R)	Charles Curtis (R)	7R, 1D	Coolidge/ Dawes (R) ✓
1925	Benjamin S. Paulen (R)	De Lanson Chase (R)	Frank J. Ryan (R)	Charles Benjamin Griffith (R)	Carl White (R)	William R. Baker (R)	William E. Davis (R)	32R, 8D	92R, 33D	Arthur Capper (R)	Charles Curtis (R)	6R, 2D	Coolidge/ Dawes (R) ✓
1926	Benjamin S. Paulen (R)	De Lanson Chase (R)	Frank J. Ryan (R)	Charles Benjamin Griffith (R)	Carl White (R)	William R. Baker (R)	William E. Davis (R)	32R, 8D	92R, 33D	Arthur Capper (R)	Charles Curtis (R)	6R, 2D	Coolidge/ Dawes (R) ✓
1927	Benjamin S. Paulen (R)	De Lanson Chase (R)	Frank J. Ryan (R)	William A. Smith (R)	Carl White (R)	William R. Baker (R)	Will J. French (R)	32R, 8D	92R, 33D	Arthur Capper (R)	Charles Curtis (R)	7R, 1D	Coolidge/ Dawes (R) ✓
1928	Benjamin S. Paulen (R)	De Lanson Chase (R)	Frank J. Ryan (R)	William A. Smith (R)	Carl White (R)	William R. Baker (R)	Will J. French (R)	32R, 8D	92R, 33D	Arthur Capper (R)	Charles Curtis (R)	7R, 1D	Hoover/ Curtis (R) ✓
1929	Clyde M. Reed (R)	Jacob W. Graybill (R)	Edgbert A. Cornell (R)	William A. Smith (R)	Tom Boyd (R)	Charles F. Hobbs (R)	Will J. French (R)	37R, 3D	101R, 24D	Arthur Capper (R)	Henry J. Allen (R)	7R, 1D	Hoover/ Curtis (R) ✓
1930	Clyde M. Reed (R)	Jacob W. Graybill (R)	Edgbert A. Cornell (R)	Roland Boynton (R)	Tom Boyd (R)	Charles F. Hobbs (R)	Will J. French (R)	37R, 3D	101R, 24D	Arthur Capper (R)	Henry J. Allen (R)	7R, 1D	Hoover/ Curtis (R) ✓
1931	Harry Hines Woodring (D)	Jacob W. Graybill (R)	Edgbert A. Cornell (R)	Roland Boynton (R)	Tom Boyd (R)	Charles F. Hobbs (R)	Will J. French (R)	37R, 3D	77R, 48D	Arthur Capper (R)	George McGill (D)	7R, 1D	Hoover/ Curtis (R) ✓
1932	Harry Hines Woodring (D)	Jacob W. Graybill (R)	Edgbert A. Cornell (R)	Roland Boynton (R)	Tom Boyd (R)	Charles F. Hobbs (R)	Will J. French (R)	37R, 3D	77R, 48D	Arthur Capper (R)	George McGill (D)	7R, 1D	Roosevelt/ Garner (D) ✓
1933	Alf Landon (R)	Charles W. Thompson (R)	Frank J. Ryan (R)	Roland Boynton (R)	William Jardine (R)	Charles F. Hobbs (R)	Will J. French (R)	23R, 17D	65R, 60D	Arthur Capper (R)	George McGill (D)	4R, 3D	Roosevelt/ Garner (D) ✓
1934	Alf Landon (R)	Charles W. Thompson (R)	Frank J. Ryan (R)	Roland Boynton (R)	J. J. Rhodes (R)	Charles F. Hobbs (R)	Will J. French (R)	23R, 17D	65R, 60D	Arthur Capper (R)	George McGill (D)	4R, 3D	Roosevelt/ Garner (D) ✓
1935	Alf Landon (R)	Charles W. Thompson (R)	Frank J. Ryan (R)	Clarence Victor Beck (R)	J. J. Rhodes (R)	Charles F. Hobbs (R)	Ed J. Powers (D)	23R, 17D	75R, 50D	Arthur Capper (R)	George McGill (D)	4R, 3D	Roosevelt/ Garner (D) ✓
1936	Alf Landon (R)	Charles W. Thompson (R)	Frank J. Ryan (R)	Clarence Victor Beck (R)	J. J. Rhodes (R)	Charles F. Hobbs (R)	George S. Robb (R)	23R, 17D	75R, 50D	Arthur Capper (R)	George McGill (D)	4R, 3D	Roosevelt/ Garner (D) ✓
1937	Walter A. Huxman (D)	William M. Lindsay (D)	Frank J. Ryan (R)	Clarence Victor Beck (R)	J. J. Rhodes (R)	Charles F. Hobbs (R)	George S. Robb (R)	25R, 15D	74R, 51D	Arthur Capper (R)	George McGill (D)	5R, 2D	Roosevelt/ Garner (D) ✓
1938	Walter A. Huxman (D)	William M. Lindsay (D)	Frank J. Ryan (R)	Clarence Victor Beck (R)	Jibo Hewitt (D)	Charles F. Hobbs (R)	George S. Robb (R)	25R, 15D	74R, 51D	Arthur Capper (R)	George McGill (D)	5R, 2D	Roosevelt/ Garner (D) ✓
1939	Payne Ratner (R)	Carl E. Friend (R)	Frank J. Ryan (R)	Jay S. Parker (R)	Walter Wilson (R)	Charles F. Hobbs (R)	George S. Robb (R)	25R, 15D	108R, 17D	Arthur Capper (R)	Clyde M. Reed (R)	6R, 1D	Roosevelt/ Garner (D) ✓
1940	Payne Ratner (R)	Carl E. Friend (R)	Frank J. Ryan (R)	Jay S. Parker (R)	Walter Wilson (R)	Charles F. Hobbs (R)	George S. Robb (R)	25R, 15D	108R, 17D	Arthur Capper (R)	Clyde M. Reed (R)	6R, 1D	Willkie/ McNary (R) ✗
1941	Payne Ratner (R)	Carl E. Friend (R)	Frank J. Ryan (R)	Jay S. Parker (R)	Walter Wilson (R)	Charles F. Hobbs (R)	George S. Robb (R)	35R, 5D	98R, 27D	Arthur Capper (R)	Clyde M. Reed (R)	6R, 1D	Willkie/ McNary (R) ✗
1942	Payne Ratner (R)	Carl E. Friend (R)	Frank J. Ryan (R)	Jay S. Parker (R)	Walter Wilson (R)	Charles F. Hobbs (R)	George S. Robb (R)	35R, 5D	98R, 27D	Arthur Capper (R)	Clyde M. Reed (R)	6R, 1D	Willkie/ McNary (R) ✗
1943	Andrew Frank Schoeppel (R)	Jess C. Denious (R)	Frank J. Ryan (R)	Alexander B. Mitchell (R)	Walter Wilson (R)	Charles F. Hobbs (R)	George S. Robb (R)	35R, 5D	113R, 12D	Arthur Capper (R)	Clyde M. Reed (R)	6R	Willkie/ McNary (R) ✗
1944	Andrew Frank Schoeppel (R)	Jess C. Denious (R)	Frank J. Ryan (R)	Alexander B. Mitchell (R)	Walter Wilson (R)	Charles F. Hobbs (R)	George S. Robb (R)	35R, 5D	113R, 12D	Arthur Capper (R)	Clyde M. Reed (R)	6R	Dewey/ Bricker (R) ✗
1945	Andrew Frank Schoeppel (R)	Jess C. Denious (R)	Frank J. Ryan (R)	Alexander B. Mitchell (R)	Elmer T. Beck (R)	Charles F. Hobbs (R)	George S. Robb (R)	39R, 1D	120R, 5D	Arthur Capper (R)	Clyde M. Reed (R)	6R	Dewey/ Bricker (R) ✗
1946	Andrew Frank Schoeppel (R)	Jess C. Denious (R)	Frank J. Ryan (R)	Alexander B. Mitchell (R)	Elmer T. Beck (R)	Charles F. Hobbs (R)	George S. Robb (R)	39R, 1D	120R, 5D	Arthur Capper (R)	Clyde M. Reed (R)	6R	Dewey/ Bricker (R) ✗
1947	Frank Carlson (R) (Note: Resigned to take an elected seat in the United States Senate.)	Frank L. Hagaman (R)	Frank J. Ryan (R)	Edward F. Arn (R)	Richard Fadely (R)	Frank Sullivan (R)	George S. Robb (R)	39R, 1D	108R, 17D	Arthur Capper (R)	Clyde M. Reed (R)	6R	Dewey/ Bricker (R) ✗
1948	Frank Carlson (R)	Frank L. Hagaman (R)	Frank J. Ryan (R)	Edward F. Arn (R)	Richard Fadely (R)	Frank Sullivan (R)	George S. Robb (R)	39R, 1D	108R, 17D	Arthur Capper (R)	Clyde M. Reed (R)	6R	Dewey/ Warren (R) ✗
1949	Frank Carlson (R)	Frank L. Hagaman (R)	Larry Ryan (D)	Harold R. Fatzer (R)	Richard Fadely (R)	Frank Sullivan (R)	George S. Robb (R)	34R, 6D	95R, 30D	Andrew Frank Schoeppel (R)	Clyde M. Reed (R)	6R	Dewey/ Warren (R) ✗
1950	Frank Carlson (R)	Frank L. Hagaman (R)	Larry Ryan (D)	Harold R. Fatzer (R)	Richard Fadely (R)	Frank Sullivan (R)	George S. Robb (R)	34R, 6D	95R, 30D	Andrew Frank Schoeppel (R)	Harry Darby (R)	6R	Dewey/ Warren (R) ✗
1950	Frank L. Hagaman (R)	vacant	Paul R. Shanahan (R)	Harold R. Fatzer (R)	Richard Fadely (R)	Frank Sullivan (R)	George S. Robb (R)	34R, 6D	95R, 30D	Andrew Frank Schoeppel (R)	Harry Darby (R)	6R	Dewey/ Warren (R) ✗
1951	Edward F. Arn (R)	Fred Hall (R)	Paul R. Shanahan (R)	Harold R. Fatzer (R)	Richard Fadely (R)	Frank Sullivan (R)	George S. Robb (R)	34R, 6D	105R, 20D	Andrew Frank Schoeppel (R)	Frank Carlson (R)	6R	Dewey/ Warren (R) ✗
1952	Edward F. Arn (R)	Fred Hall (R)	Paul R. Shanahan (R)	Harold R. Fatzer (R)	Richard Fadely (R)	Frank Sullivan (R)	George S. Robb (R)	34R, 6D	105R, 20D	Andrew Frank Schoeppel (R)	Frank Carlson (R)	6R	Eisenhower/ Nixon (R) ✓
1953	Edward F. Arn (R)	Fred Hall (R)	Paul R. Shanahan (R)	Harold R. Fatzer (R)	Richard Fadely (R)	Frank Sullivan (R)	George S. Robb (R)	35R, 5D	105R, 20D	Andrew Frank Schoeppel (R)	Frank Carlson (R)	5R, 1D	Eisenhower/ Nixon (R) ✓
1954	Edward F. Arn (R)	Fred Hall (R)	Paul R. Shanahan (R)	Harold R. Fatzer (R)	Richard Fadely (R)	Frank Sullivan (R)	George S. Robb (R)	35R, 5D	105R, 20D	Andrew Frank Schoeppel (R)	Frank Carlson (R)	5R, 1D	Eisenhower/ Nixon (R) ✓
1955	Fred Hall (R) (Note: Resigned with 11 days left in his term. The first act of his successor was to appoint him to the Kansas Supreme Court.)	John McCuish (R)	Paul R. Shanahan (R)	Harold R. Fatzer (R)	Richard Fadely (R)	Frank Sullivan (R)	George S. Robb (R)	35R, 5D	89R, 36D	Andrew Frank Schoeppel (R)	Frank Carlson (R)	6R	Eisenhower/ Nixon (R) ✓
1956	Fred Hall (R)	John McCuish (R)	Paul R. Shanahan (R)	John Anderson Jr. (R)	Richard Fadely (R)	Frank Sullivan (R)	George S. Robb (R)	35R, 5D	89R, 36D	Andrew Frank Schoeppel (R)	Frank Carlson (R)	6R	Eisenhower/ Nixon (R) ✓
1957	John McCuish (R)	vacant	Paul R. Shanahan (R)	John Anderson Jr. (R)	Richard Fadely (R)	Frank Sullivan (R)	George S. Robb (R)	32R, 8D	82R, 43D	Andrew Frank Schoeppel (R)	Frank Carlson (R)	5R, 1D	Eisenhower/ Nixon (R) ✓
1957	George Docking (D)	Joseph W. Henkle Sr. (D)	Paul R. Shanahan (R)	John Anderson Jr. (R)	Richard Fadely (R)	Frank Sullivan (R)	George S. Robb (R)	32R, 8D	82R, 43D	Andrew Frank Schoeppel (R)	Frank Carlson (R)	5R, 1D	Eisenhower/ Nixon (R) ✓
1958	George Docking (D)	Joseph W. Henkle Sr. (D)	Paul R. Shanahan (R)	John Anderson Jr. (R)	Richard Fadely (R)	Frank Sullivan (R)	George S. Robb (R)	32R, 8D	82R, 43D	Andrew Frank Schoeppel (R)	Frank Carlson (R)	5R, 1D	Eisenhower/ Nixon (R) ✓
1959	George Docking (D)	Joseph W. Henkle Sr. (D)	Paul R. Shanahan (R)	John Anderson Jr. (R)	George Hart (D)	Frank Sullivan (R)	George S. Robb (R)	32R, 8D	69R, 56D	Andrew Frank Schoeppel (R)	Frank Carlson (R)	3D, 3R	Eisenhower/ Nixon (R) ✓
1960	George Docking (D)	Joseph W. Henkle Sr. (D)	Paul R. Shanahan (R)	John Anderson Jr. (R)	George Hart (D)	Frank Sullivan (R)	George S. Robb (R)	32R, 8D	69R, 56D	Andrew Frank Schoeppel (R)	Frank Carlson (R)	3D, 3R	Nixon/ Lodge (R) ✗
1961	John Anderson Jr. (R)	Harold H. Chase (R)	Paul R. Shanahan (R)	William M. Ferguson (R)	Walter Peery (R)	Frank Sullivan (R)	Clay E. Hedrick (R)	32R, 8D	82R, 43D	Andrew Frank Schoeppel (R)	Frank Carlson (R)	5R, 1D	Nixon/ Lodge (R) ✗
1962	John Anderson Jr. (R)	Harold H. Chase (R)	Paul R. Shanahan (R)	William M. Ferguson (R)	Walter Peery (R)	Frank Sullivan (R)	Clay E. Hedrick (R)	32R, 8D	82R, 43D	James B. Pearson (R)	Frank Carlson (R)	5R, 1D	Nixon/ Lodge (R) ✗
1963	John Anderson Jr. (R)	Harold H. Chase (R)	Paul R. Shanahan (R)	William M. Ferguson (R)	Walter Peery (R)	Frank Sullivan (R)	Clay E. Hedrick (R)	32R, 8D	89R, 36D	James B. Pearson (R)	Frank Carlson (R)	5R	Nixon/ Lodge (R) ✗
1964	John Anderson Jr. (R)	Harold H. Chase (R)	Paul R. Shanahan (R)	William M. Ferguson (R)	Walter Peery (R)	Frank Sullivan (R)	Clay E. Hedrick (R)	32R, 8D	89R, 36D	James B. Pearson (R)	Frank Carlson (R)	5R	Johnson/ Humphrey (D) ✓
1965	William H. Avery (R)	John Crutcher (R)	Paul R. Shanahan (R)	Robert C. Londerholm (R)	Walter Peery (R)	Frank Sullivan (R)	Clay E. Hedrick (R)	27R, 13D	80R, 45D	James B. Pearson (R)	Frank Carlson (R)	5R	Johnson/ Humphrey (D) ✓
1966	William H. Avery (R)	John Crutcher (R)	Elwill Shanahan (R)	Robert C. Londerholm (R)	Walter Peery (R)	Frank Sullivan (R)	Clay E. Hedrick (R)	27R, 13D	80R, 45D	James B. Pearson (R)	Frank Carlson (R)	5R	Johnson/ Humphrey (D) ✓
1967	Robert Docking (D)	John Crutcher (R)	Elwill Shanahan (R)	Robert C. Londerholm (R)	Walter Peery (R)	Frank Sullivan (R)	Clay E. Hedrick (R)	27R, 13D	77R, 48D	James B. Pearson (R)	Frank Carlson (R)	5R	Johnson/ Humphrey (D) ✓
1968	Robert Docking (D)	John Crutcher (R)	Elwill Shanahan (R)	Robert C. Londerholm (R)	Walter Peery (R)	Frank Sullivan (R)	Clay E. Hedrick (R)	27R, 13D	77R, 48D	James B. Pearson (R)	Frank Carlson (R)	5R	Nixon/ Agnew (R) ✓
1969	Robert Docking (D)	Jim De Coursey (D)	Elwill Shanahan (R)	Kent Frizzell (R)	Walter Peery (R)	Frank Sullivan (R)	Clay E. Hedrick (R)	32R, 8D	87R, 38D	James B. Pearson (R)	Bob Dole (R)	5R	Nixon/ Agnew (R) ✓
1970	Robert Docking (D)	Jim De Coursey (D)	Elwill Shanahan (R)	Kent Frizzell (R)	Walter Peery (R)	Frank Sullivan (R)	Clay E. Hedrick (R)	32R, 8D	87R, 38D	James B. Pearson (R)	Bob Dole (R)	5R	Nixon/ Agnew (R) ✓
1971	Robert Docking (D)	Reynolds Shultz (R)	Elwill Shanahan (R)	Vern Miller (D)	Walter Peery (R)	Fletcher Bell (R)	Clay E. Hedrick (R)	32R, 8D	84R, 41D	James B. Pearson (R)	Bob Dole (R)	4R, 1D	Nixon/ Agnew (R) ✓
1972	Robert Docking (D)	Reynolds Shultz (R)	Elwill Shanahan (R)	Vern Miller (D)	Walter Peery (R)	Fletcher Bell (R)	Clay E. Hedrick (R)	32R, 8D	84R, 41D	James B. Pearson (R)	Bob Dole (R)	4R, 1D	Nixon/ Agnew (R) ✓
1973	Robert Docking (D)	Dave Owen (R)	Elwill Shanahan (R)	Vern Miller (D)	Tom Van Sickle (R)	Fletcher Bell (R)	Clay E. Hedrick (R)	27R, 13D	80R, 45D	James B. Pearson (R)	Bob Dole (R)	4R, 1D	Nixon/ Agnew (R) ✓
1974	Robert Docking (D)	Dave Owen (R)	Elwill Shanahan (R)	Vern Miller (D)	Tom Van Sickle (R)	Fletcher Bell (R)	Clay E. Hedrick (R)	27R, 13D	80R, 45D	James B. Pearson (R)	Bob Dole (R)	4R, 1D	Nixon/ Agnew (R) ✓

== 1975–present ==
Year	Executive offices						State Legislature		United States Congress			Electoral votes
Year	Governor	Lieutenant Governor	Secretary of State	Attorney General	Treasurer	Insurance Comm.	State Senate	State House	U.S. Senator (Class II)	U.S. Senator (Class III)	U.S. House	Electoral votes
1975	Robert Frederick (R)	Shelby Smith (R)	Elwill Shanahan (R)	Curt T. Schneider (D)	Joan Finney (D)	Fletcher Bell (R)	27R, 13D	72R, 53D	James B. Pearson (R)	Bob Dole (R)	4R, 1D	
1976	Robert Frederick (R)	Shelby Smith (R)	Elwill Shanahan (R)	Curt T. Schneider (D)	Joan Finney (D)	Fletcher Bell (R)	27R, 13D	72R, 53D	James B. Pearson (R)	Bob Dole (R)	4R, 1D	Ford/ Dole (R) ✗
1977	Robert Frederick (R)	Shelby Smith (R)	Elwill Shanahan (R)	Curt T. Schneider (D)	Joan Finney (D)	Fletcher Bell (R)	21R, 19D	65D, 60R	James B. Pearson (R)	Bob Dole (R)	3R, 2D	Ford/ Dole (R) ✗
1978	Robert Frederick (R)	Shelby Smith (R)	Jack Brier (R)	Curt T. Schneider (D)	Joan Finney (D)	Fletcher Bell (R)	21R, 19D	65D, 60R	James B. Pearson (R)	Bob Dole (R)	3R, 2D	Ford/ Dole (R) ✗
1979	John W. Carlin (D)	Paul Dugan (D)	Jack Brier (R)	Robert Stephan (R)	Joan Finney (D)	Fletcher Bell (R)	21R, 19D	69R, 56D	Nancy Kassebaum (R)	Bob Dole (R)	4R, 1D	Ford/ Dole (R) ✗
1980	John W. Carlin (D)	Paul Dugan (D)	Jack Brier (R)	Robert Stephan (R)	Joan Finney (D)	Fletcher Bell (R)	21R, 19D	69R, 56D	Nancy Kassebaum (R)	Bob Dole (R)	4R, 1D	Reagan/ Bush (R) ✓
1981	John W. Carlin (D)	Paul Dugan (D)	Jack Brier (R)	Robert Stephan (R)	Joan Finney (D)	Fletcher Bell (R)	23R, 17D	72R, 53D	Nancy Kassebaum (R)	Bob Dole (R)	4R, 1D	Reagan/ Bush (R) ✓
1982	John W. Carlin (D)	Paul Dugan (D)	Jack Brier (R)	Robert Stephan (R)	Joan Finney (D)	Fletcher Bell (R)	23R, 17D	72R, 53D	Nancy Kassebaum (R)	Bob Dole (R)	4R, 1D	Reagan/ Bush (R) ✓
1983	John W. Carlin (D)	Thomas Docking (D)	Jack Brier (R)	Robert Stephan (R)	Joan Finney (D)	Fletcher Bell (R)	23R, 17D	72R, 53D	Nancy Kassebaum (R)	Bob Dole (R)	3R, 2D	Reagan/ Bush (R) ✓
1984	John W. Carlin (D)	Thomas Docking (D)	Jack Brier (R)	Robert Stephan (R)	Joan Finney (D)	Fletcher Bell (R)	23R, 17D	72R, 53D	Nancy Kassebaum (R)	Bob Dole (R)	3R, 2D	Reagan/ Bush (R) ✓
1985	John W. Carlin (D)	Thomas Docking (D)	Jack Brier (R)	Robert Stephan (R)	Joan Finney (D)	Fletcher Bell (R)	24R, 16D	76R, 49D	Nancy Kassebaum (R)	Bob Dole (R)	3R, 2D	Reagan/ Bush (R) ✓
1986	John W. Carlin (D)	Thomas Docking (D)	Jack Brier (R)	Robert Stephan (R)	Joan Finney (D)	Fletcher Bell (R)	24R, 16D	76R, 49D	Nancy Kassebaum (R)	Bob Dole (R)	3R, 2D	Reagan/ Bush (R) ✓
1987	Mike Hayden (R)	Jack D. Walker (R)	Bill Graves (R)	Robert Stephan (R)	Joan Finney (D)	Fletcher Bell (R)	24R, 16D	74R, 51D	Nancy Kassebaum (R)	Bob Dole (R)	3R, 2D	Reagan/ Bush (R) ✓
1988	Mike Hayden (R)	Jack D. Walker (R)	Bill Graves (R)	Robert Stephan (R)	Joan Finney (D)	Fletcher Bell (R)	24R, 16D	74R, 51D	Nancy Kassebaum (R)	Bob Dole (R)	3R, 2D	Bush/ Quayle (R) ✓
1989	Mike Hayden (R)	Jack D. Walker (R)	Bill Graves (R)	Robert Stephan (R)	Joan Finney (D)	Fletcher Bell (R)	22R, 18D	67R, 58D	Nancy Kassebaum (R)	Bob Dole (R)	3R, 2D	Bush/ Quayle (R) ✓
1990	Mike Hayden (R)	Jack D. Walker (R)	Bill Graves (R)	Robert Stephan (R)	Joan Finney (D)	Fletcher Bell (R)	22R, 18D	67R, 58D	Nancy Kassebaum (R)	Bob Dole (R)	3R, 2D	Bush/ Quayle (R) ✓
1991	Joan Finney (D)	Jim Francisco (D)	Bill Graves (R)	Robert Stephan (R)	Sally Thompson (D)	Ronald L. Todd (R)	22R, 18D	63D, 62R	Nancy Kassebaum (R)	Bob Dole (R)	3R, 2D	Bush/ Quayle (R) ✓
1992	Joan Finney (D)	Jim Francisco (D)	Bill Graves (R)	Robert Stephan (R)	Sally Thompson (D)	Ronald L. Todd (R)	22R, 18D	63D, 62R	Nancy Kassebaum (R)	Bob Dole (R)	3R, 2D	Bush/ Quayle (R) ✗
1993	Joan Finney (D)	Jim Francisco (D)	Bill Graves (R)	Robert Stephan (R)	Sally Thompson (D)	Ronald L. Todd (R)	26R, 14D	66R, 59D	Nancy Kassebaum (R)	Bob Dole (R)	2D, 2R	Bush/ Quayle (R) ✗
1994	Joan Finney (D)	Jim Francisco (D)	Bill Graves (R)	Robert Stephan (R)	Sally Thompson (D)	Ronald L. Todd (R)	26R, 14D	66R, 59D	Nancy Kassebaum (R)	Bob Dole (R)	2D, 2R	Bush/ Quayle (R) ✗
1995	Bill Graves (R)	Sheila Frahm (R) (Note: Resigned as Lieutenant Governor on June 11, 1996, and was appointed by Governor Bill Graves to fill a vacancy in the United States Senate.)	Ron Thornburgh (R) (Note: Resigned.)	Carla Stovall (R)	Sally Thompson (D)	Kathleen Sebelius (D)	26R, 14D	80R, 45D	Nancy Kassebaum (R)	Bob Dole (R)	4R	Bush/ Quayle (R) ✗
1996	Bill Graves (R)	Sheila Frahm (R)	Ron Thornburgh (R)	Carla Stovall (R)	Sally Thompson (D)	Kathleen Sebelius (D)	26R, 14D	80R, 45D	Nancy Kassebaum (R)	Bob Dole (R)	4R	Dole/ Kemp (R) ✗
1996	Bill Graves (R)	Gary Sherrer (R) (Note: The state's first appointed lieutenant governor, he was appointed on July 18, 1996 to fill a vacancy and was elected in his own right in November 1998.)	Ron Thornburgh (R)	Carla Stovall (R)	Sally Thompson (D)	Kathleen Sebelius (D)	26R, 14D	80R, 45D	Nancy Kassebaum (R)	Sheila Frahm (R)	4R	Dole/ Kemp (R) ✗
1996	Bill Graves (R)	Gary Sherrer (R)	Ron Thornburgh (R)	Carla Stovall (R)	Sally Thompson (D)	Kathleen Sebelius (D)	26R, 14D	80R, 45D	Nancy Kassebaum (R)	Sam Brownback (R) (Note: Defeated Sheila Frahm in the primary, and took the seat early on November 7, 1996 after the special general election.)	4R	Dole/ Kemp (R) ✗
1997	Bill Graves (R)	Gary Sherrer (R)	Ron Thornburgh (R)	Carla Stovall (R)	Sally Thompson (D)	Kathleen Sebelius (D)	27R, 13D	77R, 48D	Pat Roberts (R)	Sam Brownback (R)	4R	Dole/ Kemp (R) ✗
1998	Bill Graves (R)	Gary Sherrer (R)	Ron Thornburgh (R)	Carla Stovall (R)	Sally Thompson (D)	Kathleen Sebelius (D)	27R, 13D	77R, 48D	Pat Roberts (R)	Sam Brownback (R)	4R	Dole/ Kemp (R) ✗
1999	Bill Graves (R)	Gary Sherrer (R)	Ron Thornburgh (R)	Carla Stovall (R)	Tim Shallenburger (R)	Kathleen Sebelius (D)	27R, 13D	77R, 48D	Pat Roberts (R)	Sam Brownback (R)	3R, 1D	Dole/ Kemp (R) ✗
2000	Bill Graves (R)	Gary Sherrer (R)	Ron Thornburgh (R)	Carla Stovall (R)	Tim Shallenburger (R)	Kathleen Sebelius (D)	27R, 13D	77R, 48D	Pat Roberts (R)	Sam Brownback (R)	3R, 1D	Bush/ Cheney (R) ✓
2001	Bill Graves (R)	Gary Sherrer (R)	Ron Thornburgh (R)	Carla Stovall (R)	Tim Shallenburger (R)	Kathleen Sebelius (D)	30R, 10D	79R, 46D	Pat Roberts (R)	Sam Brownback (R)	3R, 1D	Bush/ Cheney (R) ✓
2002	Bill Graves (R)	Gary Sherrer (R)	Ron Thornburgh (R)	Carla Stovall (R)	Tim Shallenburger (R)	Kathleen Sebelius (D)	30R, 10D	79R, 46D	Pat Roberts (R)	Sam Brownback (R)	3R, 1D	Bush/ Cheney (R) ✓
2003	Kathleen Sebelius (D) (Note: Resigned to take office as United States Secretary of Health and Human Services.)	John E. Moore (D)	Ron Thornburgh (R)	Phill Kline (R)	Lynn Jenkins (R) (Note: Elected in November 2008 to U.S. House representing Kansas's 2nd congressional district.)	Sandy Praeger (R)	30R, 10D	80R, 45D	Pat Roberts (R)	Sam Brownback (R)	3R, 1D	Bush/ Cheney (R) ✓
2004	Kathleen Sebelius (D)	John E. Moore (D)	Ron Thornburgh (R)	Phill Kline (R)	Lynn Jenkins (R)	Sandy Praeger (R)	30R, 10D	80R, 45D	Pat Roberts (R)	Sam Brownback (R)	3R, 1D	Bush/ Cheney (R) ✓
2005	Kathleen Sebelius (D)	John E. Moore (D)	Ron Thornburgh (R)	Phill Kline (R)	Lynn Jenkins (R)	Sandy Praeger (R)	30R, 10D	83R, 42D	Pat Roberts (R)	Sam Brownback (R)	3R, 1D	Bush/ Cheney (R) ✓
2006	Kathleen Sebelius (D)	John E. Moore (D)	Ron Thornburgh (R)	Phill Kline (R)	Lynn Jenkins (R)	Sandy Praeger (R)	30R, 10D	83R, 42D	Pat Roberts (R)	Sam Brownback (R)	3R, 1D	Bush/ Cheney (R) ✓
2007	Kathleen Sebelius (D)	Mark Parkinson (D)	Ron Thornburgh (R)	Paul J. Morrison (D)	Lynn Jenkins (R)	Sandy Praeger (R)	30R, 10D	78R, 47D	Pat Roberts (R)	Sam Brownback (R)	2R, 2D	Bush/ Cheney (R) ✓
2008	Kathleen Sebelius (D)	Mark Parkinson (D)	Ron Thornburgh (R)	Paul J. Morrison (D)	Lynn Jenkins (R)	Sandy Praeger (R)	30R, 10D	78R, 47D	Pat Roberts (R)	Sam Brownback (R)	2R, 2D	McCain/ Palin (R) ✗
2008	Kathleen Sebelius (D)	Mark Parkinson (D)	Ron Thornburgh (R)	Stephen Six (D) (Note: Appointed by Governor to fill vacancy.)	Lynn Jenkins (R)	Sandy Praeger (R)	30R, 10D	78R, 47D	Pat Roberts (R)	Sam Brownback (R)	2R, 2D	McCain/ Palin (R) ✗
2009	Kathleen Sebelius (D)	Mark Parkinson (D)	Ron Thornburgh (R)	Stephen Six (D)	Dennis McKinney (D)	Sandy Praeger (R)	31R, 9D	77R, 48D	Pat Roberts (R)	Sam Brownback (R)	3R, 1D	McCain/ Palin (R) ✗
2009	Mark Parkinson (D)	Troy Findley (D)	Ron Thornburgh (R)	Stephen Six (D)	Dennis McKinney (D)	Sandy Praeger (R)	31R, 9D	76R, 49D (Note: On January 12, 2009, incumbent Republican Dale Swenson switched parties to Democratic.)	Pat Roberts (R)	Sam Brownback (R)	3R, 1D	McCain/ Palin (R) ✗
2010	Mark Parkinson (D)	Troy Findley (D)	Chris Biggs (D)	Stephen Six (D)	Dennis McKinney (D)	Sandy Praeger (R)	31R, 9D	76R, 49D	Pat Roberts (R)	Sam Brownback (R)	3R, 1D	McCain/ Palin (R) ✗
2011	Sam Brownback (R) (Note: Resigned to take office as United States Ambassador-at-Large for International Religious Freedom.)	Jeff Colyer (R)	Kris Kobach (R)	Derek Schmidt (R)	Ron Estes (R)	Sandy Praeger (R)	32R, 8D (Note: In December 2010, Sen. Chris Steineger changed his party affiliation from Democratic to Republican.)	92R, 33D	Pat Roberts (R)	Jerry Moran (R)	4R	McCain/ Palin (R) ✗
2012	Sam Brownback (R)	Jeff Colyer (R)	Kris Kobach (R)	Derek Schmidt (R)	Ron Estes (R)	Sandy Praeger (R)	32R, 8D	92R, 33D	Pat Roberts (R)	Jerry Moran (R)	4R	Romney/ Ryan (R) ✗
2013	Sam Brownback (R)	Jeff Colyer (R)	Kris Kobach (R)	Derek Schmidt (R)	Ron Estes (R)	Sandy Praeger (R)	32R, 8D	92R, 33D	Pat Roberts (R)	Jerry Moran (R)	4R	Romney/ Ryan (R) ✗
2014	Sam Brownback (R)	Jeff Colyer (R)	Kris Kobach (R)	Derek Schmidt (R)	Ron Estes (R)	Sandy Praeger (R)	32R, 8D	93R, 32D (Note: On May 30, 2014, incumbent Democrat Jan Pauls switched parties to Republican.)	Pat Roberts (R)	Jerry Moran (R)	4R	Romney/ Ryan (R) ✗
2015	Sam Brownback (R)	Jeff Colyer (R)	Kris Kobach (R)	Derek Schmidt (R)	Ron Estes (R)	Ken Selzer (R)	32R, 8D	98R, 27D	Pat Roberts (R)	Jerry Moran (R)	4R	Romney/ Ryan (R) ✗
2016	Sam Brownback (R)	Jeff Colyer (R)	Kris Kobach (R)	Derek Schmidt (R)	Ron Estes (R)	Ken Selzer (R)	32R, 8D	98R, 27D	Pat Roberts (R)	Jerry Moran (R)	4R	Trump/ Pence (R) ✓
2017	Sam Brownback (R)	Jeff Colyer (R)	Kris Kobach (R)	Derek Schmidt (R)	Jake LaTurner (R)	Ken Selzer (R)	31R, 9D	85R, 40D	Pat Roberts (R)	Jerry Moran (R)	4R	Trump/ Pence (R) ✓
2018	Jeff Colyer (R)	Tracey Mann (R)	Kris Kobach (R)	Derek Schmidt (R)	Jake LaTurner (R)	Ken Selzer (R)	30R, 9D, 1I (Note: On March 7th 2018, Sen. John Doll changed his party affiliation from Republican to Independent.)	85R, 40D	Pat Roberts (R)	Jerry Moran (R)	4R	Trump/ Pence (R) ✓
2019	Laura Kelly (D)	Lynn Rogers (D)	Scott Schwab (R)	Derek Schmidt (R)	Jake LaTurner (R)	Vicki Schmidt (R)	28R, 11D, 1I (Note: Sen. Barbara Bollier changed her party affiliation from Republican to Democratic. Six days later, Sen. Dinah Sykes also changed her party affiliation from Republican to Democratic.)	84R, 41D (Note: On December 18th, 2018, Rep. Stephanie Clayton changed her party affiliation from Republican to Democratic.)	Pat Roberts (R)	Jerry Moran (R)	3R, 1D	Trump/ Pence (R) ✓
2020	Laura Kelly (D)	Lynn Rogers (D)	Scott Schwab (R)	Derek Schmidt (R)	Jake LaTurner (R)	Vicki Schmidt (R)	29R, 11D (Note: On or about July 29th, 2019, Sen. John Doll changed his party affiliation from Independent back to Republican.)	84R, 41D	Pat Roberts (R)	Jerry Moran (R)	3R, 1D	Trump/ Pence (R) ✗
2021	Laura Kelly (D)	David Toland (D)	Scott Schwab (R)	Derek Schmidt (R)	Lynn Rogers (D)	Vicki Schmidt (R)	29R, 11D	86R, 39D	Roger Marshall (R)	Jerry Moran (R)	3R, 1D	Trump/ Pence (R) ✗
2022	Laura Kelly (D)	David Toland (D)	Scott Schwab (R)	Derek Schmidt (R)	Lynn Rogers (D)	Vicki Schmidt (R)	29R, 11D	86R, 39D	Roger Marshall (R)	Jerry Moran (R)	3R, 1D	Trump/ Pence (R) ✗
2023	Laura Kelly (D)	David Toland (D)	Scott Schwab (R)	Kris Kobach (R)	Steven Johnson (R)	Vicki Schmidt (R)	28R, 11D, 1I (Note: Sen. Dennis Pyle changed his party affiliation from Republican to Independent.)	85R, 40D	Roger Marshall (R)	Jerry Moran (R)	3R, 1D	Trump/ Pence (R) ✗
2024	Laura Kelly (D)	David Toland (D)	Scott Schwab (R)	Kris Kobach (R)	Steven Johnson (R)	Vicki Schmidt (R)	28R, 11D, 1I	85R, 40D	Roger Marshall (R)	Jerry Moran (R)	3R, 1D	Trump/ Vance (R) ✓
2025	Laura Kelly (D)	David Toland (D)	Scott Schwab (R)	Kris Kobach (R)	Steven Johnson (R)	Vicki Schmidt (R)	31R, 9D	88R, 37D	Roger Marshall (R)	Jerry Moran (R)	3R, 1D	Trump/ Vance (R) ✓
2026	Laura Kelly (D)	David Toland (D)	Scott Schwab (R)	Kris Kobach (R)	Steven Johnson (R)	Vicki Schmidt (R)	31R, 9D	88R, 37D	Roger Marshall (R)	Jerry Moran (R)	3R, 1D	Trump/ Vance (R) ✓
2027	Cindy Holscher (D)	KC Ohaebosim (D)	Pat Proctor (R)	Chris Mann (D)	Steven Johnson (R)	Daniel Hawkins (R)	31R, 9D	68R, 57D	Adam Hamilton (D)	Jerry Moran (R)	3R, 1D	Trump/ Vance (R) ✓

== See also ==
- Law and government in Kansas
