= Aldamar Elder =

American politician

Aldamar P. Elder (August 17, 1854 – December 31, 1951) was an American politician and businessman.

Born in Kenduskeag, Maine, Elder moved with his parents to Kansas. Elder was a businessman in Ottawa, Kansas. In 1911, Elder served as a Democrat in the Kansas House of Representatives. In 1915, President Woodrow Wilson appointed Elder postmaster of Ottawa, Kansas. His father was Peter Percival Elder who was the Lieutenant Governor of Kansas and a member of the Kansas Legislature. He died in Ottawa, Kansas.

Aldamar Elder was the chief of the Ottawa fire department from 1885 to 1898, and served as president of the Kansas State Firemen's Association in 1897.

== Family life ==
Elder married Clara M. Maxwell (1859–1909), daughter of lawyer William Maxwell, in 1876. They had three children: Raymond (1877–1948), Pierre (1884–1959), and Clara (1885–1940). Elder married Mabel Gowdy (1876–1915) in 1913; they had two children, Damar (1915–1916) and Martha (1915–1998).
