= Alexander Miller Harvey =

American politician (1867–1928)

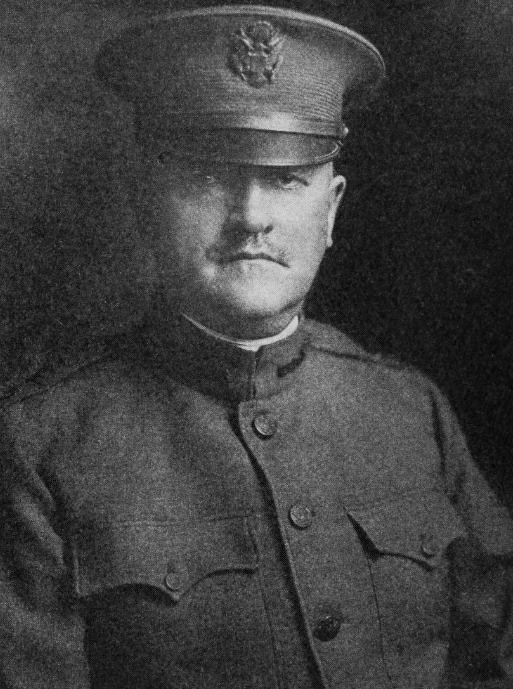

Lieutenant Governor of Kansas
- In office 1897–1899
- Governor: John W. Leedy
- Preceded by: James Armstrong Troutman
- Succeeded by: Harry E. Richter

Personal details
- Born: November 24, 1867 Richmond, Kentucky, US
- Died: March 9, 1928 (aged 60) Topeka, Kansas, US
- Party: Populist, Democrat

Alexander Miller Harvey (November 24, 1867 in Richmond, Kentucky – March 9, 1928 in Topeka, Kansas) was an American lawyer, politician, and author.

== Political career ==
A lawyer from Topeka admitted to the bar in 1893, Harvey was elected Lieutenant Governor of Kansas in 1896 on the Populist ticket along with John W. Leedy and served from 1897 to 1899.

In 1900 Harvey was again a candidate for lieutenant governor, on a Populist/Democratic/Free Silver Republican fusion ticket with John W. Breidenthal for governor; Breidenthal lost to incumbent governor William E. Stanley by 164,793 votes to 181,893.

In 1904 Harvey was the Democratic Party candidate for US representative from the First District of Kansas; he lost to the Republican Party candidate, future vice president Charles Curtis. In 1914 he lost again to Curtis, in the Republican US Senate primary (Harvey came in a poor fourth).

== Legal career ==
Harvey was the president of the Topeka Bar Association from 1922 to 1923.

Following the conviction of Industrial Workers of the World organizer Harold Fiske under the Kansas Criminal Syndicalism act in late 1923, Harvey was hired to handle the appeal to the Kansas Supreme Court and later to the United States Supreme Court. Harvey, working with his son Randal C. Harvey and Charles L. Carroll, obtained the 1927 Fiske v. Kansas decision freeing Fiske and establishing that state laws must conform to federal freedom of speech rights.

Another prominent case was the two bribery trials, on separate cases, of Governor Jonathan M. Davis in 1925, in which Harvey, fellow Populist Frank Doster, and John Addington obtained acquittals on all charges.

== Other activities ==
In May 1898 Harvey joined the 22nd Kansas Infantry as a major; the regiment did not see action and was mustered out in November 1898. During his brief time in the service Harvey served in part as a military lawyer, defending a surgeon in his regiment against a charge of grave-robbing. He was active in the National Association of Spanish–American War Veterans, serving as Inspector General in 1903.

In 1903 Harvey was one of the leaders of rescue efforts during severe flooding in Topeka, and wrote a short account of his experiences.

Harvey also wrote short stories, a collection with the title Tales and Trails of Wakarusa was published in 1917.

Harvey was also a chess player and the Kansas state chess champion as of 1909. He also had played against Emanuel Lasker in simultaneous exhibitions, scoring one win and one draw.

== Family ==
Harvey was the son of James D. Harvey (1830–1906) and his wife Rebecca (née Sparks). Harvey married Isabelle Delind Cone (1873–1962); they had three sons – Randall Cone Harvey (1897–1953), Paul Lamphere Harvey (1900–1943), and Rev. Alexander Miller Harvey (1907–1971).

Harvey's brother William West Harvey was Speaker of the Kansas House of Representatives 1921–1923 and then served on the Kansas Supreme Court from 1923 to 1956, serving as Chief Justice for the last eleven years. Another brother, Louis S. Harvey (1866–1931), was also a prominent Kansas lawyer; both brothers served, at different times, as assistant district attorneys.

A. M. Harvey was not closely related to James M. Harvey (1833–1894), Kansas governor and senator.

Political offices
Preceded by James Armstrong Troutman	Lieutenant Governor of Kansas; 1897–1899	Succeeded by Harry E. Richter
