= Kenduskeag, Maine =

Town in Maine, United States

- Town
- Flag

- Location within Maine Location within the United States
- Coordinates: 44°54′57″N 68°55′41″W
- Country: United States
- State: Maine
- County: Penobscot

Area
  - Total: 16.75 sq mi (43.38 km^{2})
  - Land: 16.75 sq mi (43.38 km^{2})
  - Water: 0 sq mi (0 km^{2})
- Elevation: 115 ft (35 m)

Population (2020)
  - Total: 1,346
  - Density: 80/sq mi (31/km^{2})
- Time zone: UTC-5 (Eastern (EST))
  - Summer (DST): UTC-4 (EDT)
- ZIP code: 04450
- Area code: 207
- FIPS code: 23-36325
- GNIS feature ID: 582538
- Website: kenduskeag.org

Kenduskeag is a town in Penobscot County, Maine, United States. The population was 1,346 at the 2020 census.

== Geography ==
According to the United States Census Bureau, the town has a total area of 16.75 square miles (43.38 km^{2}), all land.

== Demographics ==
Historical population
Census	Pop.	Note	%±
1860	816		—
1870	770		−5.6%
1880	650		−15.6%
1890	536		−17.5%
1900	423		−21.1%
1910	481		13.7%
1920	451		−6.2%
1930	397		−12.0%
1940	387		−2.5%
1950	387		0.0%
1960	584		50.9%
1970	733		25.5%
1980	1,210		65.1%
1990	1,234		2.0%
2000	1,171		−5.1%
2010	1,348		15.1%
2020	1,346		−0.1%
U.S. Decennial Census

=== 2010 census ===
As of the census of 2010, there were 1,348 people, 562 households, and 373 families living in the town. The population density was 80.5 inhabitants per square mile (31.1/km^{2}). There were 600 housing units at an average density of 35.8 per square mile (13.8/km^{2}). The racial makeup of the town was 97.4% White, 0.1% African American, 0.6% Native American, 0.6% Asian, 0.4% from other races, and 0.9% from two or more races. Hispanic or Latino of any race were 1.0% of the population.

There were 562 households, of which 31.0% had children under the age of 18 living with them, 51.4% were married couples living together, 10.9% had a female householder with no husband present, 4.1% had a male householder with no wife present, and 33.6% were non-families. 23.3% of all households were made up of individuals, and 6.7% had someone living alone who was 65 years of age or older. The average household size was 2.40 and the average family size was 2.82.

The median age in the town was 39.6 years. 22.2% of residents were under the age of 18; 7.7% were between the ages of 18 and 24; 28.8% were from 25 to 44; 30.6% were from 45 to 64; and 10.8% were 65 years of age or older. The gender makeup of the town was 50.2% male and 49.8% female.

=== 2000 census ===
As of the census of 2000, there were 1,171 people, 470 households, and 329 families living in the town. The population density was 69.8 inhabitants per square mile (26.9/km^{2}). There were 509 housing units at an average density of 30.3 per square mile (11.7/km^{2}). The racial makeup of the town was 97.01% White, 0.34% African American, 0.51% Native American, 0.26% from other races, and 1.88% from two or more races. Hispanic or Latino of any race were 0.34% of the population.

There were 470 households, out of which 31.1% had children under the age of 18 living with them, 56.2% were married couples living together, 9.4% had a female householder with no husband present, and 29.8% were non-families. 20.9% of all households were made up of individuals, and 6.6% had someone living alone who was 65 years of age or older. The average household size was 2.49 and the average family size was 2.87.

In the town, the population was spread out, with 21.9% under the age of 18, 9.1% from 18 to 24, 32.2% from 25 to 44, 26.7% from 45 to 64, and 10.1% who were 65 years of age or older. The median age was 39 years. For every 100 females, there were 97.8 males. For every 100 females age 18 and over, there were 95.7 males.

The median income for a household in the town was $34,632, and the median income for a family was $36,779. Males had a median income of $27,404 versus $20,556 for females. The per capita income for the town was $15,815. About 9.1% of families and 8.9% of the population were below the poverty line, including 12.1% of those under age 18 and 8.7% of those age 65 or over.

== Education ==
Kenduskeag is part of Maine Area School District Number 64.

== Notable people ==
- Aldamar Elder, Kansas politician and businessman
- David Slagger, former Maine representative for the Maliseet people (2012)
