= James McGrew (Kansas politician) =

American politician (1822–1911)

3rd Lieutenant Governor of Kansas
- In office 1865–1867
- Governor: Samuel J. Crawford
- Preceded by: Thomas A. Osborn
- Succeeded by: Nehemiah Green

James McGrew (January 26, 1822 – 19 January 1911) was an American politician. Between 1865 and 1867 he served as Lieutenant Governor of Kansas.

== Formative years ==
James McGrew was born in Adams County, Pennsylvania on January 26, 1822. He lived with his parents in Ohio and Indiana for a few years.

When he was twenty-two years old, he moved with his parents to the Iowa Territory, to the Sac and Fox Reservation, and worked as a merchant at Keokuk.

== Career ==
As a young adult, McGrew managed a department store in the Iowa Territory town of Lancaster. In 1857, he relocated to Wyandotte County, Kansas, where he continued to work as a merchant.

McGrew subsequently joined the Republican Party; in 1859 and 1860, he served as a member of the Legislative of the Kansas Territory. In addition, he was twice elected as the mayor of Wyandotte, which is now a part of Kansas City, Kansas.

In 1862, he was elected to the Kansas Senate. Two years later, he won the election for the office of Lieutenant Governor of Kansas. He served in this position as the deputy of Governor Samuel J. Crawford between January 9, 1865 and January 14, 1867 when his term ended.

After the end of his term, he returned to his business as a merchant.

== Personal life and death ==
McGrew was married twice and was survived by several children. He died of sudden heart problems on January 19, 1911 in Kansas City, Kansas.

Political offices
| Preceded by Thomas A. Osborn | Lieutenant Governor of Kansas; 1865–1867 | Succeeded by Nehemiah Green |
