= 7th Rhode Island Infantry Regiment =

- Active: May 22, 1862 to June 9, 1865
- Country: United States
- Allegiance: Union
- Branch: Infantry
- Engagements: Battle of Fredericksburg; Siege of Vicksburg; Siege of Jackson; Battle of the Wilderness; Battle of Spotsylvania Court House; Battle of Cold Harbor; Battle of the Crater; Battle of Fort Stedman; Appomattox Campaign; Assault on Petersburg

Commanders
- Notable commanders: Colonel Zenas Bliss

The 7th Rhode Island Infantry Regiment was an infantry regiment of the Union Army during the American Civil War.

== Formation ==
On May 22, 1862, Governor William Sprague issued general orders for the raising of the 7th Rhode Island Infantry Regiment. This regiment was to be the last three-year infantry regiment to be raised in Rhode Island. Camp Bliss was erected in southern Providence and was to be the destination for the recruits for the regiment. Many men came to Camp Bliss in the summer of 1862. Some were Mexican–American War veterans, or had seen service in the United States Army and other volunteer regiments. Some were politicians and gentlemen from the hierarchy of the state. The majority were fifteen- to thirty-year-old farmers and mill workers from southern and western Rhode Island who enlisted in the regiment under the call of President Abraham Lincoln for 300,000 men to defend the Union following a series of humiliating defeats in Virginia. The largest push for recruits came in August, with some towns offering incentives as high as four hundred dollars for men to enlist; though the large bounties encouraged many to come forward, large numbers joined to preserve the Union. Many of their officers were known to them by their first name. They attained their positions through political influence or past experience in the service. In short time one thousand young Rhode Islanders had gathered at Camp Bliss.

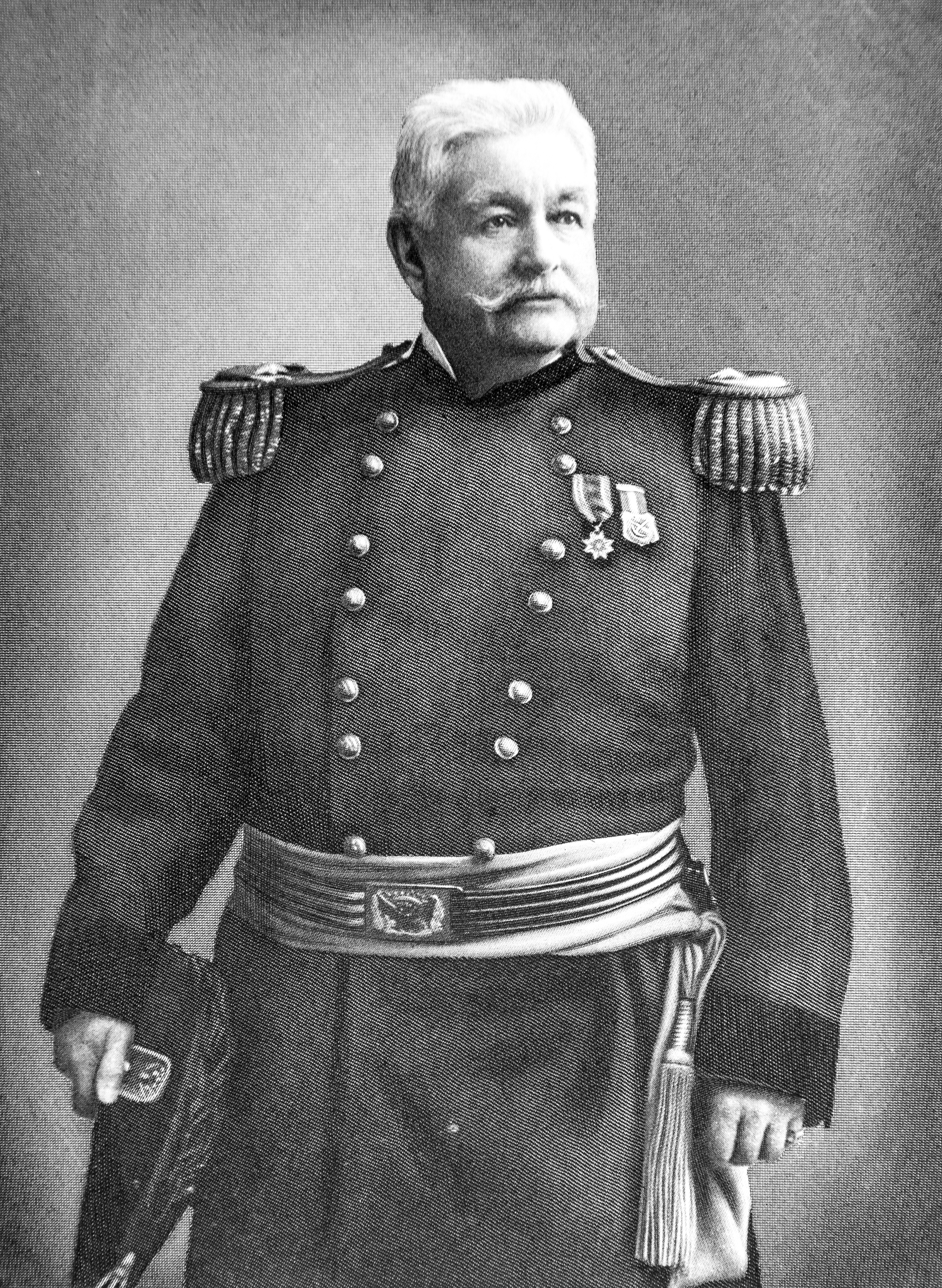
Zenas Bliss

To command them, Governor Sprague selected Zenas Bliss of Johnston. Bliss was a graduate of West Point and had attained the rank of captain in the Eighth United States Infantry Regiment. In the years ahead he would transform these men from Rhode Island from untrained volunteers into a regiment on par with the United States Regulars.

The Seventh Rhode Island Volunteers was mustered into the service of the United States to serve for three years on September 6, 1862. They also drew Enfield rifle-muskets on this day. In addition the Seventh was clothed in the full uniform of the United States Army; a feature of their coats being a very high collar. On September 10, the regiment left Rhode Island and proceeded to Camp Casey outside of Washington, D.C. Here they remained for several weeks before joining the First Brigade, Second Division, Ninth Corps on October 6, encamped outside Sharpsburg, Maryland following the victory at Antietam a month earlier. The Seventh remained encamped at Pleasant Valley, Maryland, for three weeks, perfecting its drill, while losing several members of the regiment to disease and the elements.

== Battle of Fredericksburg ==
In late October the Army of the Potomac again embarked upon another campaign to capture Richmond, Virginia. In early November, Ninth Corps commander, Major General Ambrose Burnside assumed command of the Army of the Potomac. On November 15, the Seventh fought its first engagement, holding a key bridge against Confederate cavalry. Later that month they arrived at Fredericksburg, Virginia. The city lay in their path to attack Richmond. Burnside waited for over two weeks for pontoons to allow his army to cross. The result would be the near destruction of the Seventh Rhode Island.

The Battle of Fredericksburg was one of the worst defeats of the Civil War for the Federal Army. The Army of the Potomac had to attack across a wide open plain to reach a Confederate division entrenched behind a sunken road. In addition, Marye’s Height contained twenty-four pieces of artillery. The Seventh Rhode Island went in at 12:20 on the afternoon of December 13, 1862. Almost immediately, Rhode Islanders were being killed and maimed. Lieutenant Colonel Welcome B. Sayles was hit in the chest by a shell, sprinkling pieces of his body all over members of the Seventh. After halting in the middle of the field to fire their Enfields, the Seventh surged forward in an attempt to flank the wall; they were repulsed by "a perfect volcano of flame." They halted one hundred and fifty paces from the sunken road. Their flag became the farthest advanced banner in the Ninth Corps. After remaining on the field for seven hours, the Seventh was relieved and returned to Fredericksburg. 570 officers and men went into the fight, 220 became casualties; including over 50 dead. As the regiment assembled after its charge, all Colonel Bliss could say to his battered regiment of young Rhode Islanders was "you have covered yourself with mud and glory." Bliss would be nominated for promotion to brigadier general and receive a Medal of Honor for his actions. Many of his enlisted men would receive promotions for their actions on the field.

== Mississippi Campaign ==
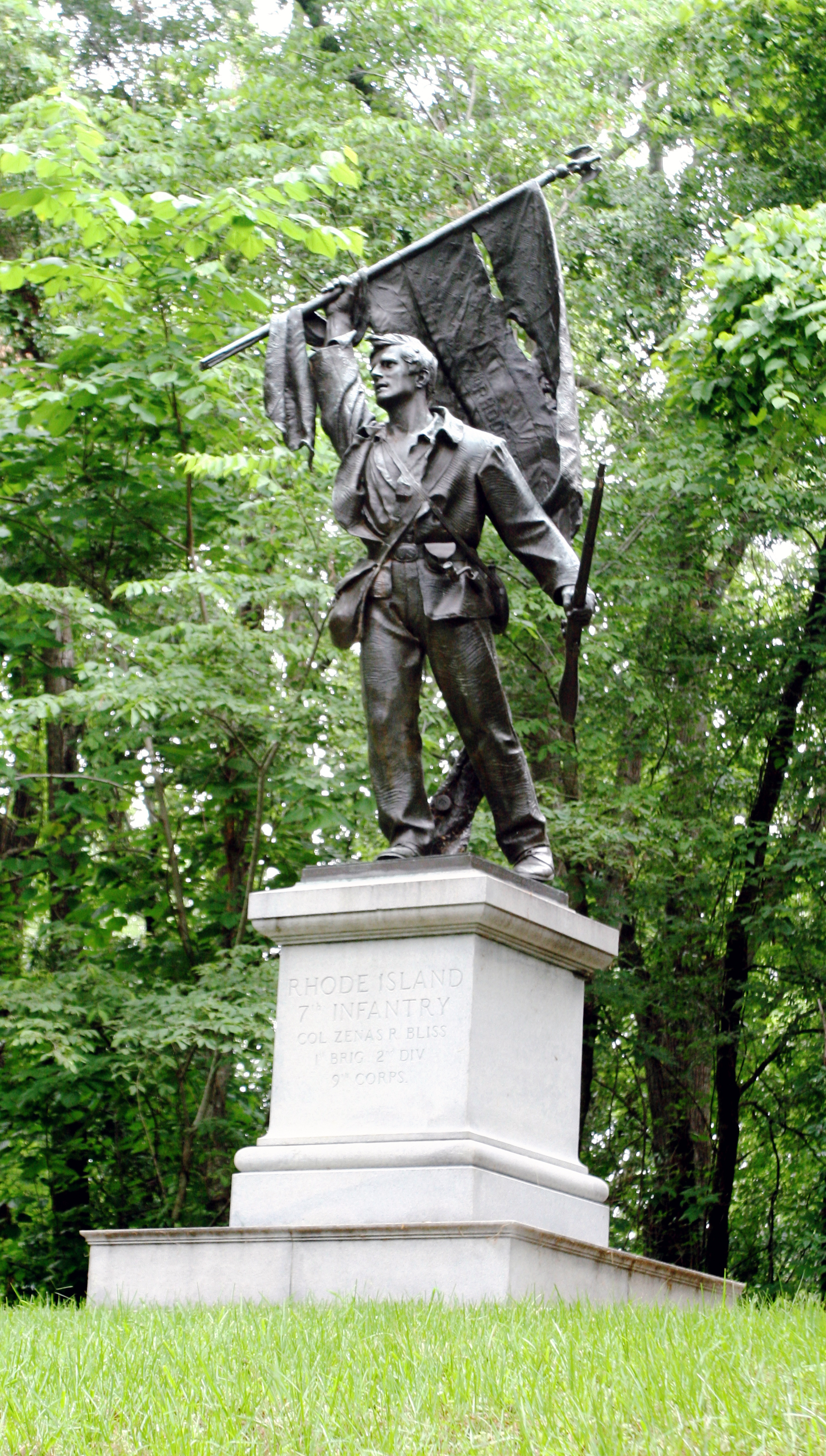
Vicksburg memorial

Following the Battle of Fredericksburg, the Seventh Rhode Island returned to its winter camp across the Rappahannock River near Falmouth, Virginia. Here many of the men would experience the hardships that their ancestors experienced at Valley Forge some eighty-five years earlier. Food and money was scarce, while typhoid, dysentery, and pneumonia reduced the regiment even further. Even in the worst of weather, one company of the regiment was constantly on picket duty along the river. A respite came in mid-February when the Ninth Corps was transferred to Suffolk, Virginia. From here they were again transferred to Lexington, Kentucky when Burnside was given command of the Army of the Ohio.

In June the Seventh left Cairo, Illinois as reinforcements for Ulysses S. Grant’s army as they besieged Vicksburg, Mississippi. They spent several weeks entrenching around Vicksburg before being sent to Jackson, in order to prevent Confederates from reinforcing the Vicksburg garrison. Here they defeated the Rebels at the Battle of Jackson. Though the Mississippi Campaign only lasted for two months, forty-seven Rhode Islanders lost their lives; only two were killed in action. In August they were recalled to Kentucky. The Seventh entered Mississippi with slightly over three hundred men; over half would be infected by disease. Yazoo Fever, dysentery, and typhoid reduced the regiment to mere company strength.

They spent a miserably cold and wet winter as the provost marshal in Lexington, Kentucky. Here they protected the loyal citizens against John Hunt Morgan’s Confederate guerillas. Following this, the regiment was again summoned to Virginia in April 1864 as reinforcements to the Army of the Potomac.

== Virginia ==
At this time only two hundred and fifty men were on duty. The Seventh returned to Virginia and crossed the Rapidan on the road to Richmond. They were held in reserve at the Battle of the Wilderness on May 5–7, yet were heavily engaged May 12 at Spotsylvania Courthouse. From this day on the Seventh was engaged in combat nearly continuously. On May 18 and again on May 23 at the North Anna River every member of the color guard was killed or wounded. In these two engagements nearly one hundred Rhode Islanders fell. The Seventh was in reserve at Cold Harbor, where 7,000 Union soldiers became casualties in less than ten minutes; but were engaged in skirmishes at Bethesda Church and Mechanicsville. In mid June they arrived at Petersburg with only one hundred and twenty-five men present for duty. As they were constantly under fire, at least one member of the regiment was killed or wounded every day in July and August. On June 20, 1864, Company H mustered one man present for duty; only two commissioned officers remained, while most companies mustered ten men, some commanded by corporals. With such a reduced number men, the Seventh Rhode Island was pulled off the line and acted as engineers for the Second Division, Ninth Corps. Colonel Bliss was thrown from his horse at Spotsylvania, so Percy Daniels was commissioned as lieutenant colonel.

On July 30, at the Battle of the Crater, the Seventh was held in reserve. They remained in their entrenchments throughout August and September, losing even more men. On September 30, 1864, the Battle of Poplar Springs Church was fought and several days later an engagement at Hatcher’s Run. In November they were consolidated with the 4th Rhode Island Volunteer Infantry. In addition, men returned to duty and recruits arrived from Rhode Island. By December, over three hundred men were available for duty.

In November the Seventh moved to Fort Sedgwick, also known as Fort Hell as it was the closest fort at Petersburg to the Confederate line. The men lived underground in shelters known as “bombproofs” to escape the murderous fire outside. The Seventh remained here until April 2, 1865, when they helped storm into Petersburg and then pursued Lee to Appomattox Court House. The original regiment was mustered out of the service on June 9, 1864, while the recruits were mustered out on July 13, 1865. 1,282 men served in the Seventh Rhode Island; 220 died. On March 13, 1865, General Ulysses S. Grant formally gave his permission for the Seventh Rhode Island Volunteers to paint the following engagements upon their colors where they had fought and died: Fredericksburg, Vicksburg, Jackson, Spotsylvania, North Anna, Cold Harbor, Petersburg, Weldon Railroad, Poplar Spring Church, and Hatcher’s Run.

== See also ==
- List of Rhode Island Civil War units
