= Percy Daniels =

American politician

- Born: September 17, 1840; Woonsocket, Rhode Island
- Died: February 14, 1916 (aged 75) Girard, Kansas
- Buried: Girard Cemetery; Girard, Kansas
- Allegiance: United States
- Branch: United States Army; Union Army
- Rank: Brevet Colonel
- Commands: 7th Rhode Island Infantry

Percy Daniels (September 17, 1840 in Globe Village in Woonsocket, Rhode Island – February 14, 1916 in Girard, Kansas) was an American soldier, businessman, civil engineer, surveyor, author and Populist politician.

== Early life and Civil War ==
Daniels was the second son of Judge David Daniels (1804-1847), a Rhode Island lawyer and businessman who acquired his title by serving as a Judge of the Common Pleas court for a term. Daniels' mother was Nancy Ballou, daughter of Dexter Ballou, a wealthy Rhode Island mill-owner. Daniels' father and mother both died when he was six years old. He received a good education, studying at Westminster Seminary in Westminster, Vermont and the University Grammar School in Providence, Rhode Island. His studies in civil engineering were interrupted by a serious illness. At the outbreak of the Civil War Daniels was not healthy enough to enlist, but after spending time in Michigan recovering his health he enlisted in the 7th Rhode Island Infantry in May 1862. By January 1863 he was in command of Company E, which he had largely raised himself, and he was made a captain in March 1863. His older brother Herbert (1836-1926) helped him recruit and served in the same regiment. In June 1864 Percy was raised to lieutenant colonel and breveted to colonel, as Col. Zenas Bliss had been injured; Daniels remained in command of the regiment for the remainder of the war.

== Life post-war ==
After the Civil War Daniels spent several years doing civil engineering work for the Cincinnati Southern Railway. He then travelled around the Midwest and decided to settle in Kansas. After a trip back to the east coast to marry schoolteacher Eliza Eddy in June 1867, he settled in Crawfordsville, Kansas and opened a store with his brother-in-law William Eddy. He also acquired land in Crawford Township near Girard which he named "Narragansett Farm" in memory of his native Rhode Island. After a while he gave up the store (Crawfordsville was rapidly disappearing anyway) and worked as a farmer and surveyor. In 1873 he went back east to work in the engineering department of the city of Worcester, Massachusetts, becoming chief engineer by 1878 when he resigned and returned to Rhode Island, where he did engineering work and helped resolve the estate of his brother Francis A. Daniels. In 1881 he returned to Kansas, where he principally worked on his farm, although he spent periods of time doing engineering work for railroads and serving as the county surveyor in Crawford County.

== Political career ==
About 1888 Daniels became involved with politics. In 1890 he purchased the Girard Herald newspaper in order to advance his views, such as that the Republican party should "destroy the trusts" and institute better methods of taxation, such as a graduated estate tax. After his views were endorsed by the local People's Party and County Alliance, he sold the newspaper, considering his job done. He served as a delegate to local and national nominating conventions of the People's Party, including the 1892 Omaha Convention that nominated James B. Weaver. In June 1892 he was nominated in absentia for lieutenant governor by the People's Party and was elected to a two-year term. While lieutenant governor he attracted national attention for his proposed graduated tax on estates.

Daniels had been appointed a brigadier general in the Kansas militia (1873-4) by Governor Thomas A. Osborn and while lieutenant governor was made a major general and overall commander by Governor Lorenzo D. Lewelling. In that capacity he commanded units that ended a strike by coal-miners in southeastern Kansas in 1893.

Daniels' political career largely ended with the swift decline of the People's Party after the national election of 1896. He is buried in the Girard Cemetery in Girard, Kansas.

== Political writing ==
Daniels' A Crisis for the Husbandman, self-published in 1889, was the first of a number of works on issues of the day that Daniels wrote. These included A Lesson of Today and a Question of To-morrow (1892), A Sunflower Tangle Over Problems of Taxation (1894), Cutting the Gordian Knot (1896), The Midnight Message of Paul Revere (1896), Man Versus Mammon (1897), Swollen Fortunes and the Problem of the Unemployed (1908), and Graduated Property Taxation (1911). Many of these were published versions of lectures by Daniels.

== Family ==
Daniels and his wife Eliza Eddy had five children: Frank Leonard (1869–70), Frederic Percy (1871-1950), Walter Horton (1873-1950), Elizabeth Buttrick (1877-1965), and Earle Newton (1880-1970).

Political offices
Preceded by Andrew J. Felt	Lieutenant Governor of Kansas; 1893–1895	Succeeded by James A. Troutman
