= 1874 Kansas gubernatorial election =

- November 3, 1874
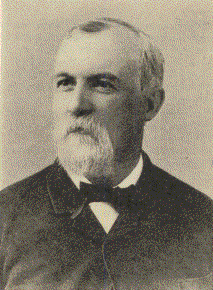

Nominee	Thomas A. Osborn	James C. Cusey
Party	Republican	Democratic
Popular vote	48,794	35,301
Percentage	56.41%	40.81%
- County results Osborn: 50–60% 60–70% 70–80% 80–90% >90% Cusey: 40–50% 50–60% 60–70% 70–80% Marshall: 40–50% No Data/Vote
Governor before election
Thomas A. Osborn
Republican
Elected Governor
Thomas A. Osborn
Republican

The 1874 Kansas gubernatorial election was held on November 3, 1874. Incumbent Republican Thomas A. Osborn defeated Democratic nominee James C. Cusey with 56.41% of the vote.

== General election ==
=== Candidates ===
Major party candidates

- Thomas A. Osborn, Republican
- James C. Cusey, Democratic

Other candidates

- W. K. Marshall, Temperance

=== Results ===
1874 Kansas gubernatorial election
Party	Candidate	Votes	%	±%
Republican	Thomas A. Osborn (incumbent)	48,794	56.41%	
Democratic	James C. Cusey	35,301	40.81%	
Prohibition	W. K. Marshall	2,277	2.63%	
Majority		13,493		
Turnout				
Republican hold		Swing		
