= Charles W. Thompson (Kansas politician) =

American politician

Charles Warren Thompson (22 July 1867 – 1 June 1965) was an American politician. Between 1933 and 1937 he served as Lieutenant Governor of Kansas.

== Life ==
Charles Thompson was born in Ottumwa, Iowa. In 1879 he came with his parents to Marion, Kansas, where he attended the public schools. He earned his first money as a newsboy and as a clerk in a department store. Later he founded and managed his own department store in Marion. He joined the Republican Party and became a member of the school board and the city council of Marion. In 1921 he was elected to the Kansas Senate where he served two terms as State Senator.

In 1932 Thompson was elected to the office of the Lieutenant Governor of Kansas. After a re-election in 1934 he served two terms in this position between 9 January 1933 and 11 January 1937 when his second term ended. In this function he was the deputy of Governor Alf Landon, who also served two terms between 1933 and 1937. Thompson was also engaged in banking and became one of the directors of the Merchants National Bank of Topeka. He was also a director and chairman of the executive committee of the Federal Home Loan Bank of Topeka. In addition he became President of the Aetna Building & Loan Association. Besides these activities he was also a member of various organizations and associations. Charles Thompson died on 1 June 1950 in Topeka, Kansas.

Party political offices
Preceded by Jacob W. Graybill	Republican nominee for Lieutenant Governor of Kansas; 1932, 1934	Succeeded by Carl E. Friend
Political offices
Preceded by Jacob W. Graybill	Lieutenant Governor of Kansas; 1933–1937	Succeeded by William M. Lindsay
