= James Armstrong Troutman =

American politician

Lieutenant Governor of Kansas
- In office January 14, 1895 – January 11, 1897
- Governor: Edmund Needham Morrill
- Preceded by: Percy Daniels
- Succeeded by: Alexander Miller Harvey

Personal details
- Born: December 1, 1853 Fulton County, Indiana, US
- Died: December 25, 1926 (aged 73) Topeka, Kansas, US
- Party: Republican
- Occupation: Politician, teacher, attorney

James Armstrong Troutman (December 1, 1853, in Fulton County, Indiana – December 25, 1926, in Topeka, Kansas) was an American politician, teacher and attorney. Between 1895 and 1897 he served as Lieutenant Governor of Kansas.

== Life ==
James Troutman was born in Fulton County, Indiana. For three years he taught school in Indiana and Kansas. Afterwards he studied law and after his admission to the bar he began to practice as an attorney. In addition he was engaged in the newspaper business. As a supporter of the Temperance Movement he became the editor of the Kansas Temperance Palladium for one year. He joined the Republican Party and in 1893 he was elected to the Kansas Legislature. In 1894 Troutman was elected to the office of the Lieutenant Governor of Kansas. He served in this position between January 14, 1895, and January 11, 1897. In this function he was the deputy of Governor Edmund Needham Morrill. Later he was a four term mayor of the no longer existing village Potwin Place in Shawnee County, Kansas. He died on 25 December 1926 in Topeka, Kansas.

Political offices
Preceded by Percy Daniels	Lieutenant Governor of Kansas; 1895–1897	Succeeded by Alexander Miller Harvey
