= William James Fitzgerald (Kansas politician) =

American politician

William James Fitzgerald (November 1, 1861 – December 17, 1937) was an American politician. Between 1907 and 1911 he served as Lieutenant Governor of Kansas.

== Life ==
Fitzgerald was born in Monroe, Wisconsin. He attended the Lombard College in Galesburg, Illinois. In the following years he taught schools in Illinois and Iowa. Since 1883 he lived in Dodge City, Kansas, where he was engaged in the cattle and farming business. In addition he raised horses. He joined the Republican Party and became a member of the city council and the education board of Dodge City. In 1894 he was elected to the Kansas House of Representatives where he became a member of the ways and means committee. He was also the chairman of a sub committee to investigate old claims and accounts against the state. He remained in this chamber until 1897.

In 1906 Fitzgerald was elected to the office of the Lieutenant Governor of Kansas. After a re-election in 1908 he served two terms in this position between 14 January 1907 and 9 January 1911 when his second term ended. In this function he was the deputy of Governor Edward W. Hoch (first term) and Governor Walter R. Stubbs (second term). After the end of his time as Lieutenant Governor Fitzgerald stayed active in politics. He was a delegate to various Republican Conventions on local and state levels. For four years he served as Finance Commissioner of Dodge City. In that capacity he supported the implementation of the new water works system, the extension of the sanitary sewer system, and the street paving. Besides his political activities he still managed his various agricultural enterprises. Fitzgerald died on December 17, 1937, in San Diego, California, at the age of 77.

Political offices
Preceded by David John Hanna	Lieutenant Governor of Kansas; 1907–1911	Succeeded by Richard Joseph Hopkins
