= Harry E. Richter =

American politician (1847–1911)

Harry E. Richter (23 April 1847 – 15 December 1911) was an American politician. Between 1899 and 1903 he served as Lieutenant Governor of Kansas.

== Life ==
Harry Richter was born in Vermillion in Ohio. He attended schools in Hamilton, Ohio and Rushville, Indiana. In 1864 he joined the Union Army and served until the end of the Civil War. After the war he studied pharmacy and became a druggist. In 1871 he moved to Council Grove, Kansas, where he started a political career. He joined the Republican Party and became a member of the city council and the education board of Council Grove. For a while he was also sheriff in Morris County, Kansas. In this function he fought successfully against crimes and violation. Richter was then a three term mayor of Council Grove. He also served three terms as a member and as president of the board of directors of the state prison. For two years he held a seat in the Kansas House of Representatives and for four years he was a member of the State Senate.

In 1898 Harry Richter was elected to the office of the Lieutenant Governor of Kansas. After a re-election in 1900 he served two terms in this position between 9 January 1899 and 12 January 1903 when his second term ended. In this function he was the deputy of Governor William E. Stanley. In 1902 he ran unsuccessfully for his party's nomination for the governor's office. Richter was also a member of the Grand Army of the Republic and he was engaged in various business enterprises. He died on 15 December 1911 in Emporia, Kansas.

Political offices
Preceded by Alexander Miller Harvey	Lieutenant Governor of Kansas; 1899–1903	Succeeded by David John Hanna
