= Frank L. Hagaman =

American lawyer and politician

Frank Leslie Hagaman
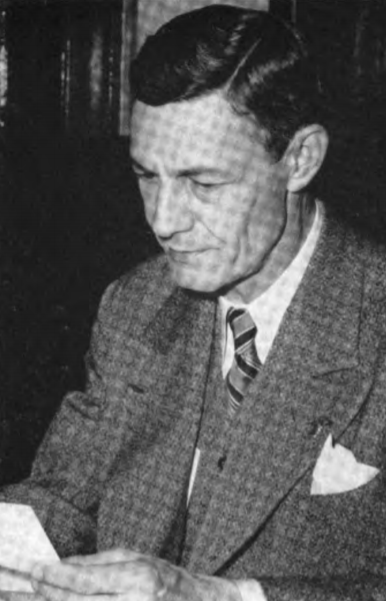

31st Governor of Kansas
- In office November 28, 1950 – January 8, 1951
- Lieutenant: Vacant
- Preceded by: Frank Carlson
- Succeeded by: Edward F. Arn

30th Lieutenant Governor of Kansas
- In office January 13, 1947 – November 28, 1950
- Governor: Frank Carlson
- Preceded by: Jess C. Denious
- Succeeded by: Fred Hall

Member of the Kansas House of Representatives

Personal details
- Born: June 1, 1894 Bushnell, Illinois, U.S.
- Died: June 23, 1966 (aged 72) Kansas City, Kansas, U.S.
- Party: Republican
- Spouse: Elisabeth Blair Sutton
- Education: University of Kansas; George Washington University (J.D.)
- Profession: attorney

Frank Leslie Hagaman (June 1, 1894 – June 23, 1966) was an American lawyer and politician. He served as the 30th lieutenant governor of Kansas and later as the 31st governor of Kansas.

== Early life ==
Frank Leslie Hagaman was born in Bushnell, Illinois, to Frank and Hattie Hagaman. The family moved first to Kansas City, Missouri, and later to Rosedale, Kansas. After graduating from Rosedale High School, Hagaman worked as a shipping clerk and later graduated from the University of Kansas. He earned his J.D. in 1921 from the George Washington University School of Law.

== Adult life ==
Hagaman served in the 117th Kansas Ammunition Train during World War I and received a Purple Heart with a special citation.

In 1920 he married Elizabeth Sutton of Russell, Kansas. In 1921, he went on to receive an education in law at the George Washington University Law School, in Washington, D.C. He then returned to Kansas to establish his law practice in Wyandotte County, where he worked as the Assistant County Assessor.

== Political life ==
Hagaman was elected to be the Johnson County representative to the state legislature, first in 1939, and was re-elected twice more. In 1948 he was elected Lieutenant Governor under Governor Frank Carlson.

Hagaman entered the governor's office when Governor Frank Carlson replaced Senator Harry Darby in the United States Senate. His term in office lasted only forty-one days until he was replaced by Edward Arn.

Hagaman's tenure as governor of Kansas was what one might call a caretaker administration. During his time in office, a time when the legislature was not in session, Hagaman concentrated almost exclusively on the budget. In an unprecedented move, Governor Hagaman invited Governor-elect Edward Arn to budget hearings. Arn was the man to whom Hagaman lost the party nomination, during the primary election.

== Post-political life ==
After losing the bid for Republican Party nomination as governor, Hagaman returned to his law practice in Fairway, Kansas. His legal practice allowed him to argue cases in courts in Kansas, Missouri and the United States Supreme Court.

Hagaman died in a hospital in Kansas City on June 23, 1966, and is buried at Fairmount Cemetery in Denver, Colorado.

Party political offices
Preceded by Jess C. Denious	Republican nominee for Lieutenant Governor of Kansas; 1946, 1948	Succeeded by Fred Hall
Political offices
Preceded by Jess C. Denious	Lieutenant Governor of Kansas; 1947–1950	Succeeded by Fred Hall
Preceded by Frank Carlson	Governor of Kansas; 1950–1951	Succeeded by Edward F. Arn
