= Andrew Jackson Felt =

American politician

Andrew Jackson Felt (27 December 1833 – 27 June 1912) was an American politician. Between 1889 and 1893 he served as Lieutenant Governor of Kansas.

== Life ==
Andrew Felt was born in Victor, New York. He taught school and edited a newspaper. Later he studied law and after his admission to the bar he began to practice as an attorney. Until the beginning of the American Civil War he lived in Bradford in Iowa. During the war he served in the Union Army. After the end of the war he returned to Iowa. He joined the Republican Party and in 1868 and 1872 he was a delegate to the Republican National Conventions. At that time he also held the office of postmaster in his home village. In addition he was engaged in the banking business. Somewhere between 1872 and 1884 he moved to Seneca, Kansas. In 1884 he was a Presidential Elector for Kansas. In 1888 Andrew Felt was elected to the office of the Lieutenant Governor of Kansas. After a re-election in 1890 he served two terms between 14 January 1889 and 9 January 1893 when his second term ended. In this function he was the deputy of Governor Lyman U. Humphrey who also served two terms. Felt was also a member of the Grand Army of the Republic. He died on 27 June 1912 in Garden City, Kansas.

Political offices
Preceded by Alexander P. Riddle	Lieutenant Governor of Kansas; 1889–1893	Succeeded by Percy Daniels
