= Carl E. Friend =

American politician

Carl Edison Friend

28th Lieutenant Governor of Kansas
- In office January 9, 1939 – January 11, 1943
- Governor: Payne Ratner
- Preceded by: William M. Lindsay
- Succeeded by: J. C. Denious

Member of the Kansas Senate
- In office 1933–1939

Personal details
- Born: April 18, 1869 Saint Joseph, Missouri, U.S.
- Died: February 23, 1948 (aged 78) Lawrence, Kansas, U.S.
- Resting place: Oak Hill Cemetery; Lawrence, Kansas, U.S.
- Party: Republican
- Children: 3
- Education: Kansas State University

Carlton Edison Friend (April 18, 1869 – February 23, 1948) was an American Republican politician who served as the 28th Lieutenant Governor of Kansas from 1939 until 1943.

== Biography ==
Friend was born in 1869 in Saint Joseph, Missouri and later graduated from Kansas State College (now Kansas State University). He entered politics in 1932, being elected to the Kansas State Senate that year, and became Lieutenant Governor in 1939, serving until 1943. In 1940, Friend was appointed vice president of the executive committee of the University of Kansas Endowment Association. He served in that position until his death in Lawrence, Kansas on February 23, 1948.

Party political offices
Preceded by Charles W. Thompson	Republican nominee for Lieutenant Governor of Kansas; 1936, 1938, 1940	Succeeded by Jess C. Denious
