= Jess C. Denious =

American politician (1879–1953)

29th Lieutenant Governor of Kansas
- In office January 11, 1943 – January 13, 1947
- Governor: Andrew Frank Schoeppel
- Preceded by: Carl E. Friend
- Succeeded by: Frank L. Hagaman

Member of the Kansas Senate from the 35th district
- In office 1937–1941
- Preceded by: R. C. Russell
- Succeeded by: Riley W. MacGregor

Member of the Kansas Senate from the 37th district
- In office 1933–1937
- Preceded by: John Wesley Davis
- Succeeded by: Raimon G. Walters

Personal details
- Born: July 14, 1879 Mogadore, Ohio, U.S.
- Died: December 1, 1953 (aged 74) Dodge City, Kansas, U.S.
- Resting place: Maple Grove Cemetery
- Party: Republican
- Spouse: Juliet Pettijohn
- Children: 2
- Education: Drake University; Baker University

Jess C. Denious (July 14, 1879 – December 1, 1953) served as Lieutenant Governor of Kansas from 1943 until 1947.

== Early life ==
Denious was born in Mogadore, Ohio to Oliver and Martha Denious. The family moved to Kansas at the age of five, first living in Galesburg before moving to Erie. He moved to Colorado for a year before attending Drake University. Denious transferred to Baker University and graduated from there in 1905.

== Career ==
Denious worked for the Ottawa Herald and co-owned the Erie Record from 1906 until 1909. He acquired the Globe-Republican in 1910, changing its name to the Dodge City Daily Globe. Denious would continue as publisher until his death.

Denious served as a delegate to the 1924 Republican National Convention. He was elected to the Kansas Senate in 1932 from the 37th district, which was later renumbered the 35th, serving until 1941. Denious was elected lieutenant governor in 1942, serving under Governor Andrew Frank Schoeppel. He died in Dodge City in 1953.

== Family ==
Denious married Juliet Pettijohn in 1915. He had two children; Martha (1919–2017) and Jess Jr. (1928–1969).

Party political offices
Preceded by Carl E. Friend	Republican nominee for Lieutenant Governor of Kansas; 1942, 1944	Succeeded by Frank L. Hagaman
