= David Wesley Finney =

American politician (1839–1916)

David Wesley Finney (22 August 1839 – 1 November 1916) was an American politician. Between 1881 and 1885 he served as Lieutenant Governor of Kansas.

== Life ==
David Finney was born in Annapolis, Indiana and grew up on a farm. During the American Civil War he served between 1862 and 1865 in the Union Army. In 1863 he was captured by Confederate Soldiers and for two month he was arrested in the Libby Prison. After a change of prisoners he was released and returned to the Union Army. In 1864 he belonged to the troops of General William Tecumseh Sherman that were on their March through the South (Sherman's March to the Sea).

In 1866 Finney arrived in Neosho Falls, Kansas where he was engaged in the grocery and hardware business as well as in selling and buying stock. He joined the Republican Party and became a Member of the Kansas House of Representatives. Between 1872 and 1880 he held a seat in the Kansas Senate, where he was the chairperson of a committee to reform the education system. In his home town he functioned as Justice of Peace.

In 1880 David Finney was elected to the office of the Lieutenant Governor of Kansas. After a re-election in 1882 he served two terms between 10 January 1881 and 12 January 1885 when his second term ended. In this function he was the deputy of Governor John St. John (first term) and of Governor George Washington Glick (second term). Finney was also a member of the Grand Army of the Republic where he held the rank of a Quartermaster. Since 1869 he was married with Helen H. McConnell. The couple had two children. David Finney died on 1 November 1916 in Emporia, Kansas.

Political offices
Preceded by Lyman U. Humphrey	Lieutenant Governor of Kansas; 1881–1885	Succeeded by Alexander P. Riddle
