= James M. Harvey (politician) =

American politician (1833–1894)

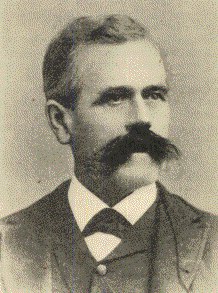

United States Senator from Kansas
- In office February 12, 1874 – March 3, 1877
- Preceded by: Robert Crozier
- Succeeded by: Preston B. Plumb

5th Governor of Kansas
- In office January 11, 1869 – January 13, 1873
- Lieutenant: Charles Vernon Eskridge; Peter Percival Elder
- Preceded by: Nehemiah Green
- Succeeded by: Thomas A. Osborn

Member of the Kansas House of Representatives
- In office 1865–1866

Member of the Kansas Senate
- In office 1867–1868

Personal details
- Born: September 21, 1833 Monroe County, Virginia, US
- Died: April 15, 1894 (aged 60) Riley County, Kansas, US
- Party: Republican
- Spouse: Charlotte Richardson Cutter
- Profession: Civil engineer, soldier, surveyor, farmer

Military service
- Branch/service: Union Army
- Years of service: 1861–1864
- Rank: Captain
- Unit: 4th Kansas Volunteer Infantry; 10th Kansas Volunteer Infantry
- Battles/wars: American Civil War

James Madison Harvey (September 21, 1833 – April 15, 1894) was a United States senator from Kansas and the fifth governor of Kansas.

Born near Salt Sulphur Springs, Virginia (now West Virginia), Harvey attended common schools in Indiana, Illinois, and Iowa. He married Charlotte Richardson Cutter and they had nine children.

Harvey became a civil engineer and headed west as a prospector to Pike's Peak in 1859 as a Fifty-Niner. After meeting several discouraged miners along the way, Harvey decided to settle instead in Kansas Territory, so he acquired a plot of land in Riley County near Fort Riley and engaged in agricultural pursuits. From 1861 to 1864, he served with the Union Army during the Civil War, advancing to the rank of captain in the 4th Kansas Infantry, which failed to complete organization and was consolidated with other recruits to form the 10th Kansas Infantry. He attained the rank of captain, commanding the 14th Regiment, Kansas State Militia.

Harvey was elected to the Kansas House of Representatives, 1865–1866, and then elected to the Kansas Senate in 1867–1868. He was Governor of Kansas for two terms, serving from 1868 to 1872, and then elected as a Republican to the U.S. Senate to fill the vacancy caused by the resignation of Alexander Caldwell, where he served from February 12, 1874, to March 3, 1877.

After his U.S. Senate term, Harvey worked as a government surveyor in New Mexico, Utah, Nevada, and Oklahoma, before returning to Kansas in 1890 to resume agricultural pursuits. Harvey County, Kansas, was named for him.

Harvey died near Junction City, Kansas, in 1894. Interment was in Highland Cemetery, Junction City.

Party political offices
Preceded by Samuel J. Crawford	Republican nominee for Governor of Kansas; 1868, 1870	Succeeded by Thomas A. Osborn
Political offices
Preceded by Nehemiah Green	Governor of Kansas; 1869–1873	Succeeded by Thomas A. Osborn
U.S. Senate
Preceded by Robert Crozier	U.S. senator (Class 2) from Kansas; February 12, 1874 – March 3, 1877	Succeeded by Preston B. Plumb
