= Elias S. Stover =

American politician (1836–1927)

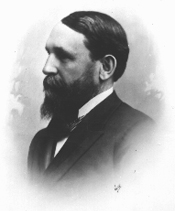
- Elias S. Stover, 1892
- Born: November 22, 1836; St. George, Maine
- Died: February 3, 1927 (aged 90); Albuquerque, New Mexico

Elias Sleeper Stover (November 22, 1836 – February 3, 1927) was an American businessman, politician, and university president.

Stover was the son of a sea captain and initially followed his father's trade and went to sea. Stover moved to Kansas in 1858. He was an artillery officer in the 2nd Regiment Kansas Volunteer Cavalry during the Civil War and saw much action including the Battle of Cane Hill, the Battle of Prairie Grove, and the Battle of Dardanelle. He was promoted to captain in 1863. He served in the Kansas legislature for three sessions, in 1867 in the House and in 1871 and 1872 in the Senate. A Republican, he was elected the seventh Lieutenant Governor in 1873 serving under Governor Thomas A. Osborn. Stover moved to New Mexico in 1876 and continued his political career there, serving as County Commissioner of Bernalillo County 1881-1883 and a member of a constitutional convention in 1889. He served in the Territorial legislature in 1891. From 1891 to 1897 he served as the first president of the University of New Mexico.

In Kansas, Stover was one of the founders of the First National Bank of Council Grove. In 1867 he was appointed Indian agent to the Kaw tribe. Stover was one of the principals of Stover, Crary, and Co., a large wholesale grocer in Albuquerque, and one of the founders of the First National Bank of Albuquerque.

When the Atchison, Topeka, and Santa Fe Railroad was approaching the area in 1879–1880, the railroad was seeking cheap land for shops and yards. Stover and fellow Albuquerque merchants Franz Huning and William Hazeldine formed the New Mexico Town Company as a subsidiary of the railroad and quietly bought up 3.1 square miles of land about two miles from the existing town center. Stover was also the first president of the New Mexico Territorial Fair in 1881.

Stover Avenue in Albuquerque is named after Elias S. Stover.

Stover married Susan Gage (1844–1903) in 1874; they had one child, Roderick Stover (1880–1919). Elias Stover married Margaret Zearing (1852–1934) in 1920.

Political offices
Preceded by Peter Percival Elder	Lieutenant Governor of Kansas; 1873–1875	Succeeded by Melville J. Salter
