= William M. Lindsay =

American politician

William M. Lindsay (24 July 1880 – 22 February 1957) was an American politician. Between 1937 and 1939 he served as Lieutenant Governor of Kansas.

== Life ==
William Lindsay was born in Allegany County, Maryland. There is almost no information available about his life besides politics. Since 1886 he lived in Kansas and for at least some time he resided in Pittsburg. He joined the Democratic Party and in 1936 he was elected as the first Democrat to the office of the Lieutenant Governor of Kansas. He served in this function between 11 January 1937 and 9 January 1939 when his term ended. In this function he was the deputy of Governor Walter A. Huxman. He died on 22 February 1957 in Pittsburg (Kansas).

Party political offices
Preceded by James B. Wood	Democratic nominee for Lieutenant Governor of Kansas; 1936, 1938	Succeeded by I. S. Woodward
Political offices
Preceded by Charles W. Thompson	Lieutenant Governor of Kansas; 1937–1939	Succeeded by Carl E. Friend
