= Fletcher Bell =

American politician

21st Kansas Insurance Commissioner
- In office January 11, 1971 – January 14, 1991
- Governor: Robert Docking; Robert Frederick Bennett; John W. Carlin; Mike Hayden
- Preceded by: Frank Sullivan
- Succeeded by: Ron Todd

Personal details
- Born: July 26, 1929; Lawrence, Kansas
- Died: February 18, 2000 (aged 70)
- Political party: Republican

Fletcher Bell (July 26, 1929 – February 18, 2000) was an American politician who served as the Kansas Insurance Commissioner from 1971 to 1991.

Party political offices
Preceded by Frank Sullivan	Republican nominee for Kansas Insurance Commissioner; 1972, 1974, 1976, 1978, 1982, 1986	Succeeded by Ronald L. Todd
