= David John Hanna =

American politician (1866–1946)

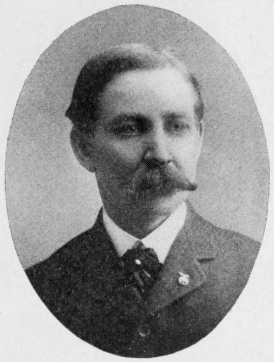

Lieutenant Governor of Kansas
- In office January 12, 1903 – January 14, 1907

Member of the Kansas House of Representatives
- In office 1896–1897
- Constituency: Graham County

Personal details
- Born: June 4, 1866 Randolph County, Illinois
- Died: April 12, 1946 (aged 79) Glendale, California
- Party: Republican
- Spouse: May Keleher (m. 1905)
- Occupation: Farmer, politician

David John Hanna (June 4, 1866 – April 12, 1946) was an American politician. Between 1903 and 1907 he served as Lieutenant Governor of Kansas.

== Early life and career ==
David Hanna was born in Randolph County, Illinois on June 4, 1866. In his childhood he moved with his parents to Clay County, Kansas where he grew up. Later he was engaged in farming, cattle raising and in the real estate business. In addition he became president of the Farmers and Merchants Bank of Hill City.

He joined the Republican Party, and in 1896 and 1897 he represented Graham County, Kansas in the Kansas Legislature. He was also a member of the Republican State Central Committee for six years. In 1900 he was a delegate to the Republican National Convention in Philadelphia that nominated President William McKinley for a second term.

In 1902 David Hanna was elected to the office of the Lieutenant Governor of Kansas. After a re-election in 1904 he served two terms in this position between January 12, 1903 and January 14, 1907 when his second term ended. In this function he was the deputy of Governor Willis J. Bailey (first term) and Governor Edward W. Hoch (second term). After the end of his time as Lieutenant Governor, Hanna did not occupy any further political offices.

== Personal life ==
Hanna married May Keleher on January 1, 1905.

He died on April 12, 1946 in Glendale, California.

Political offices
Preceded by Harry E. Richter	Lieutenant Governor of Kansas; 1903–1907	Succeeded by William James Fitzgerald
