= Nehemiah Green =

American politician (1837–1890)

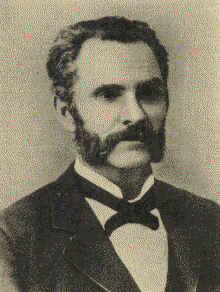

4th Governor of Kansas
- In office November 4, 1868 – January 11, 1869
- Lieutenant: Vacant
- Preceded by: Samuel J. Crawford
- Succeeded by: James M. Harvey

4th Lieutenant Governor of Kansas
- In office 1867–1868
- Governor: Samuel J. Crawford
- Preceded by: James McGrew
- Succeeded by: Charles Vernon Eskridge

Personal details
- Born: March 8, 1837 Hardin County, Ohio, US
- Died: January 12, 1890 (aged 52) Manhattan, Kansas, US
- Party: Republican
- Profession: Minister

Nehemiah Green (March 8, 1837 – January 12, 1890) was the fourth governor of Kansas, serving in that position on an interim basis from November 1868 to January 1869. He subsequently served as Speaker pro Tempore of the Kansas House of Representatives.

== Background ==
Green was born in Hardin County, Ohio. In 1855, he moved to Kansas Territory with two of his brothers, Lewis F. and George S., both of whom later served in the Kansas legislature. After two years in Kansas, Green returned to Ohio to complete his education at Ohio Wesleyan University. Following graduation in 1859 he served as minister at Methodist churches in Aberdeen, Ohio, and Williamsburg, Ohio.

During the Civil War, Green enlisted as a private in the 153rd Ohio Infantry, a 100 days service regiment in 1864, but a serious illness in his lungs forced him to leave the service with the rank of sergeant major. Following the war Green moved to Manhattan, Kansas, where he served as a minister.

== Political career ==
In 1866, Green was elected the lieutenant governor under Samuel Crawford. He ascended to the Governorship when Crawford resigned to join the military a little more than two months before the inauguration of governor-elect James M. Harvey.

After leaving office, Green returned to the ministry in Manhattan. He also served as a regent of, and taught military drill tactics at, Kansas State Agricultural College. After several years outside politics, Green was elected to the Kansas House of Representatives in 1880 and served as Speaker pro-tem until 1882. He died in 1890 from lingering complications from his Civil War illness, and is buried in Manhattan's Sunset Cemetery.

The town of Green, Kansas, is named in his honor.

Political offices
| Preceded by James McGrew | Lieutenant Governor of Kansas; 1867–1868 | Succeeded by Charles Vernon Eskridge |
| Preceded by Samuel J. Crawford | Governor of Kansas; 1868–1869 | Succeeded by James M. Harvey |
