= Peter Percival Elder =

American politician

Peter Percival Elder (born New Portland, Maine, September 20, 1823; died Ottawa, Kansas, November 19, 1914) was an American politician, businessman, and newspaperman.

Born to a farming family in northern Maine, Elder was educated at schools in Farmington and Readfield, Maine and then became a teacher. An abolitionist, Elder moved to Kansas in 1857 to aid the Free-State cause, settling in Franklin County, which he later helped organize, serving on the first county board of commissioners. In 1859 he was elected clerk of the territorial house of representatives. In 1860 he was elected to the state senate under the Wyandotte Constitution. In 1861 he was appointed agent for the Osage and Seneca Indian tribes at Fort Scott, and he helped keep those tribes friendly during the Civil War, even raising Osage recruits for the Union army.

Elder resigned his position in 1865 and took up residence in the new town of Ottawa, building the first large house there. In 1868 he was elected to the state senate to fill a vacancy. In 1870 he served as chairman of the Kansas Republican central committee, and was elected the sixth Lieutenant Governor of Kansas serving under Governor James M. Harvey. From 1875 to 1877 and in 1883 he served in the Kansas House of Representatives; 1877 he was elected Speaker. In 1890 he was again elected to the house of representatives, this time on the "Alliance" ticket, and was again Speaker.

Elder pursued a various of businesses in Ottawa. He was the president of a railroad which built tracks from Ottawa to Olathe. He operated a banking business and was later president of the First National Bank of Ottawa. He resigned from the bank in 1873 to devote more time to his large interests in farming and stock raising. In 1896 he founded the Ottawa Times newspaper and was its publisher and editor for some years.

Elder married Catherine Felker (1824–1912) in 1845; they had two children, Aldamar (1854–1951) and Olena (1846–1910). Aldamar was a prominent local businessman and was himself elected to the Kansas House of Representatives, as a Democrat, in 1910.

== Publications ==
P. P. Elder's Financial History: Ups and Downs from 1862 to 1880, Ottawa, Kansas (undated)

Political offices
Preceded by Charles Vernon Eskridge	Lieutenant Governor of Kansas; 1871–1873	Succeeded by Elias Sleeper Stover
