= Jacob W. Graybill =

American politician

Jacob W. Graybill (17 April 1861 – 24 March 1934) was an American politician. Between 1929 and 1933 he served as Lieutenant Governor of Kansas.

== Life ==
Jacob Graybill was born in McAlisterville, Pennsylvania. In 1876 he came with his parents to Kansas where his family bought a farm in Harvey County, Kansas. He attended local schools and studied medicine at the University of Kansas. Since 1898 he practiced as a physician in Mound Ridge. In the years 1903 and 1904 he took additional medical courses at the Philadelphia Polyclinic School and at the University of Pennsylvania. Afterwards he practiced in Newton, Kansas. Between 1905 and 1908 he was the Health Officer of Harvey county. In addition he served as surgeon in the Kansas National Guard during the term of Governor Edward W. Hoch (1905–1909). Graybill was also a member of various medical Associations and Organizations.

He joined the Republican Party and in 1908 he was a member of the electoral college which officially elected William Howard Taft to president. In 1928 he was elected to the office of the Lieutenant Governor of Kansas. After a re-election in 1930 he served two terms in this position between 14 January 1929 and 9 January 1933 when his second term ended. In this function he was the deputy of Governor Clyde M. Reed (first term) and Harry Hines Woodring (second term). He died on 24 March 1934 in Junction City, Kansas.

Party political offices
Preceded by De Lanson Alson Newton Chase	Republican nominee for Lieutenant Governor of Kansas; 1928, 1930	Succeeded by Charles W. Thompson
Political offices
Preceded by De Lanson Alson Newton Chase	Lieutenant Governor of Kansas; 1929–1933	Succeeded by Charles W. Thompson
