= Alexander P. Riddle =

American politician

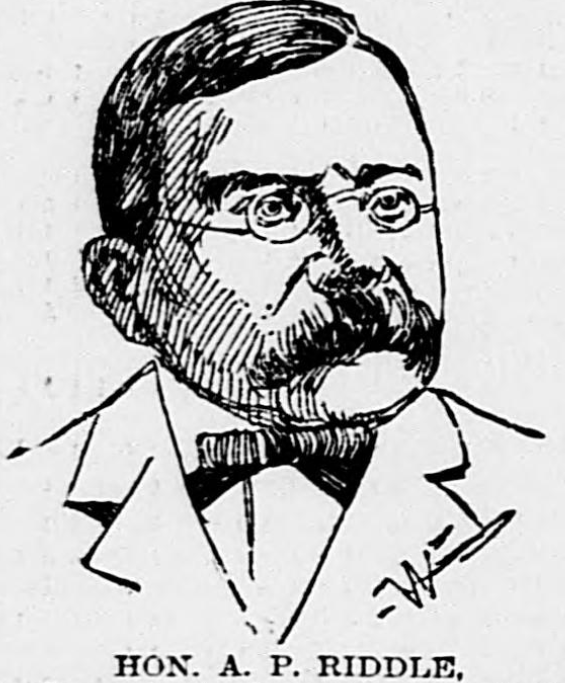
Sketch of Alexander P. Riddle, 1896

Alexander Pancoast Riddle (born Harlansburgh, Pennsylvania, August 16, 1846; died near Salina, Kansas, May 13, 1909) was an American newspaperman and Republican politician of Ottawa County, Kansas; he served as the 11th lieutenant governor of Kansas from 1885 to 1889.

== Life ==
While his father, Dr. John W. Riddle (1820-1909), was serving as an army surgeon in the Civil War, young Riddle obtained work at the Franklin, Pennsylvania Spectator newspaper and became a journeyman printer. He arrived in Kansas after the war and in 1873 was able to purchase a half-interest in the Girard Press. In 1885 he moved to Minneapolis, Kansas and purchased the Minneapolis Messenger newspaper there.

A member of the Republican party, Riddle came into politics by serving as the journal clerk of the state senate from 1876 to 1880. From 1881 to 1884 he served as a state senator, representing Crawford and Bourbon counties. He served as president pro tem of the senate in an emergency session in 1884 occasioned by an outbreak of hoof and mouth disease. In 1884 he was elected lieutenant governor on the Republican ticket, serving with governor John A. Martin. Martin and Riddle were re-elected in 1886. Riddle was appointed as a state insurance commissioner in 1896 and served a two-year term.

Riddle was active in the affairs of several fraternal organizations, holding high office in the Knights of Pythias, Improved Order of Red Men, and International Order of Odd Fellows. He published monthly newspapers for the Knights of Pythias (the Sprig of Myrtle) and Ancient Order of United Workmen (the Kansas Workman).

Riddle was killed in an automobile accident near Salina, Kansas when a car hit an embankment and the persons in the back seat, including Riddle, were thrown out of the car. He is buried in the Girard Cemetery in Girard, Kansas.

== Family ==
Riddle married Ada Fuller in 1878 and the couple had four children, Estelle Riddle Dodge (1879–1964), Mary (1882–3), Genevieve Louise (1884–1967), and Arthur Fuller (1886–1967). Estelle was a journalist and newspaper editor; she was active in the sorority Kappa Alpha Theta for much of her life and wrote a memoir and history entitled Sixty Years in Kappa Alpha Theta: 1870-1929 (1930). Arthur Fuller Riddle took over as editor of the Minneapolis Messenger after his father's death; he was later the editor of the Idaho Statesman from 1929 to 1950.

Political offices
Preceded by David Wesley Finney	Lieutenant Governor of Kansas; 1885–1889	Succeeded by Andrew Jackson Felt
