= De Lanson Alson Newton Chase =

American politician (1875–1953)

De Lanson Alson Newton Chase (26 April 1875 – 19 October 1953) was an American politician. Between 1925 and 1929 he served as Lieutenant Governor of Kansas.

== Life ==
De Lanson Chase was born in Jay, Vermont. In 1893 he graduated from the Central Business College at Leavenworth, Kansas. Afterwards he studied law at the Omaha School of Law and after his admission to the bar in 1901 he began to work as an attorney. Later he got involved in many other business activities and he founded several companies such as the D. A. N. Chase Motor Company, the Pleasanton Monument Company and the D. A. N. Chase Dry Goods Company. In addition he owned the Burke Printing Company. Chase was also engaged in the real estate business and in banking. Eventually he reached the position of the President of the First National Bank of Pleasanton.

Chase joined the Republican Party. For nine years he was treasurer of the Pleasanton school district and between 1916 and 1920 he was a member of the Kansas House of Representatives. From 1920 until 1924 he served as a State Senator. In 1924 he was elected to the office of Lieutenant Governor of Kansas. After being re-elected in 1926 he served two terms in the position between 12 January 1925 and 14 January 1929 when his second term ended. In this function he was the deputy of Governor Benjamin S. Paulen. In 1928 he ran unsuccessfully for the Republican ticket for Governor. He died on 19 October 1953 in Ottawa, Kansas.

Party political offices
Preceded by Benjamin S. Paulen	Republican nominee for Lieutenant Governor of Kansas; 1924, 1926	Succeeded by Jacob W. Graybill
Political offices
Preceded by Benjamin S. Paulen	Lieutenant Governor of Kansas; 1925–1929	Succeeded by Jacob W. Graybill
