= Melville J. Salter =

American politician

Lieutenant Governor of Kansas
- In office 1875–1877
- Preceded by: Elias S. Stover
- Succeeded by: Lyman U. Humphrey

Melville Judson Salter (born Sardinia, New York, June 20, 1834; died Pawnee Station, Kansas, March 12, 1896) was a politician and civic leader who was twice elected the eighth Lieutenant Governor of Kansas serving under Governor Thomas A. Osborn.

Salter's family left their farm in New York and moved to Battle Creek, Michigan when Salter was one year old. In 1840 the family moved again, to Marshall, Michigan, where he became a Baptist at the age of 16. Salter went west to California in 1852 to seek his fortune in the gold fields. In 1856 he learned of the death of his mother and decided to return home; while in Panama, a chance decision to take a railroad excursion with a friend saved him from the Watermelon Riot. He remained in Michigan until 1871. Salter then bought land near Thayer in Chetopa Township, Neosho County, Kansas, where he served for five years as township trustee. For several years he was the president of the Settlers' Protective Association, which was organized to protect settlers' land claims from competing claims by Native Americans and railroads. The settlers' claims were vindicated by a US Supreme Court decision (Leavenworth Lawrence and Galveston Railroad Company v. United States) delivered in 1876. Salter was elected as a Republican to be lieutenant governor of Kansas in 1874 and again in 1876. He resigned in 1877 to take a post as registrar of the land office in Independence, Kansas, which he held until 1884. By 1890 Salter had moved from Independence to Pawnee Station in Bourbon County, Kansas, where he ran a store with two of his sons.

Salter served on the board of trustees of the Kansas State Agricultural College (now Kansas State University) from 1875 to 1880, and served as the chairman for four years.

Salter was a strict Baptist, and one source tells the story of how, asked to organize a dance for the governor, Lt. Gov. Salter instead read psalms and prayers until all the musicians left.

Salter married Sarah Hinkle in 1856; they had three sons. His son Lewis A. Salter (1858-1916), a lawyer and businessman, married Susanna M. Kinsey, who as Susanna M. Salter became the first elected female mayor in the United States.

Political offices
Preceded by Elias S. Stover	Lieutenant Governor of Kansas; 1875–1877	Succeeded by Lyman U. Humphrey
