= Thomas A. Osborn =

American politician

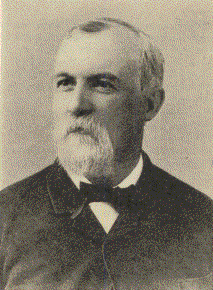

6th Governor of Kansas
- In office January 13, 1873 – January 8, 1877
- Lieutenant: Elias S. Stover; Melville J. Salter
- Preceded by: James M. Harvey
- Succeeded by: George T. Anthony

2nd Lieutenant Governor of Kansas
- In office January 12, 1863 – January 9, 1865
- Governor: Thomas Carney
- Preceded by: Joseph Pomeroy Root
- Succeeded by: James McGrew

Personal details
- Born: October 26, 1836 Crawford County, Pennsylvania, US
- Died: February 4, 1898 (aged 61) Meadville, Pennsylvania, US
- Party: Republican
- Spouse: Julia Delehay
- Profession: Printer, attorney, U.S. marshal, diplomat

Thomas Andrew Osborn (October 26, 1836 – February 4, 1898) was an American lawyer, politician, and diplomat. He served as the sixth governor of Kansas, from 1873 to 1877.

== Biography ==
Osborn was born in Meadville, Pennsylvania. As a young man, he was apprenticed as a printer, from which he supported himself through Allegheny College. In 1856, he began to study law under a Meadville judge and was admitted to the Michigan bar in 1857. He married Julia Delahey and they had one child.

In November 1857, Osborn moved to Lawrence, Kansas, where he became a compositor for the Herald of Freedom. The following year, Osborn was practicing law in Elwood, Kansas, and was known to be a Republican and Free-State supporter. He was elected to the state senate in December 1859. He became president of the senate in 1861 and presided over impeachment proceedings of the governor. Osborn was appointed U. S. Marshall and held that post from 1865 to 1867.

Osborn was Governor of Kansas from 1873 to 1877, having been first elected in 1872 and then re-elected in 1874. Subsequently, he was appointed as Minister to Chile, serving from 1877 to 1881, and as Minister to Brazil, serving from 1881 to 1885. In 1892, he was put forth as a primary challenger to Kanza Indian, and attorney, Charles Curtis, who later became Vice President of the United States.

Osborn's wife died in 1892. In 1898, he was engaged to Marguerite Fowler Richmond of Meadville, Pennsylvania. While awaiting their wedding, Osborn died and his body was returned to Kansas. He is buried in Topeka Cemetery in Topeka, Kansas.

Party political offices
Preceded by James M. Harvey	Republican nominee for Governor of Kansas; 1872, 1874	Succeeded by George T. Anthony
Political offices
Preceded by Joseph Pomeroy Root	Lieutenant Governor of Kansas; 1863–1865	Succeeded by James McGrew
Preceded by James M. Harvey	Governor of Kansas; January 13, 1873 – January 8, 1877	Succeeded by George T. Anthony
Diplomatic posts
Preceded by Cornelius A. Logan	United States Minister to Chile; August 28, 1877 – July 25, 1881	Succeeded by Hugh Judson Kilpatrick
Preceded by Henry W. Hilliard	United States Minister to Brazil; December 17, 1881 – July 11, 1885	Succeeded by Thomas J. Jarvis
