= Lieutenant Governor of Kansas =

Governmental position

Lieutenant Governor of the State of Kansas
- Great Seal of the State of Kansas

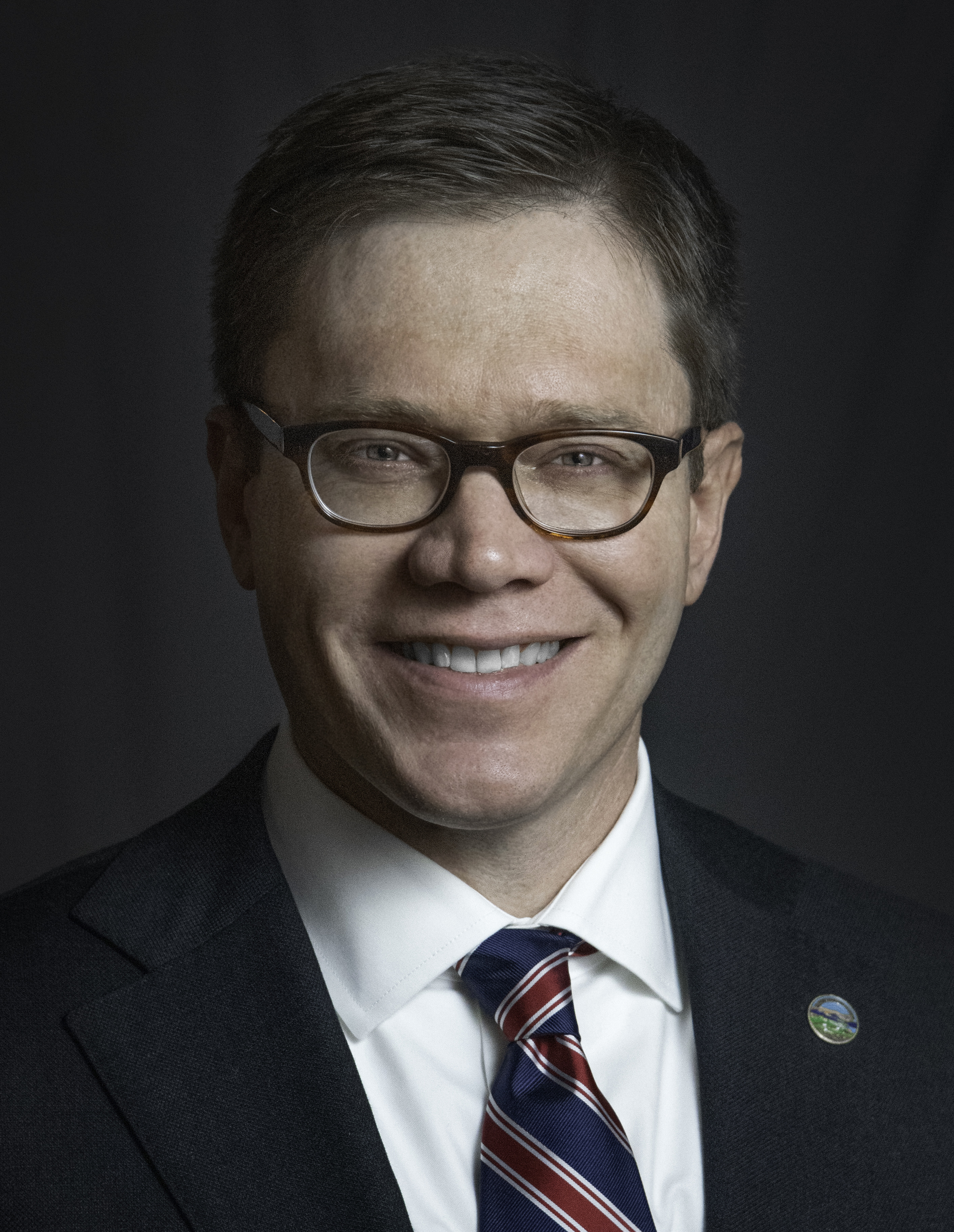
- Incumbent; David Toland since January 2, 2021
- Government of Kansas
- Term length: Four years, renewable once consecutively
- Formation: February 9, 1861
- Succession: First

The lieutenant governor of Kansas is the second-ranking member of the executive branch of Kansas state government. The lieutenant governor is elected on a ticket with the governor for a four-year term. The lieutenant governor succeeds to the office of governor if the office becomes vacant, and also serves as acting governor if the governor is incapacitated or absent from the state.

== Constitutional requirements ==
The Constitution of Kansas provides that the Lieutenant Governor must satisfy the same constitutional qualifications as the Governor – that is, none.

== Powers and duties ==
Similar to the vice president of the United States, the main function of the lieutenant governor lies in the executive branch as the immediate successor to the governorship in the event of a vacancy. In case of impeachment, death, failure to qualify or resignation of the governor, the governorship, with its compensation and responsibilities, shall devolve upon the lieutenant governor for the residue of the term. In the event of the governor's absences from the State, or inability to discharge the powers and duties of the office, the lieutenant governor shall become the "acting governor" until the governor returns to the state or the disability is removed.

== List of officeholders ==
| Image | Lieutenant Governor | Term | Party |
|---|---|---|---|
| | Joseph Pomeroy Root | 1861–1863 | Republican |
| | Thomas A. Osborn | 1863–1865 | Republican |
| | James McGrew | 1865–1867 | Republican |
| | Nehemiah Green | 1867–1868 | Republican |
| | Charles Vernon Eskridge | 1869–1871 | Republican |
| | Peter Percival Elder | 1871–1873 | Republican |
| | Elias S. Stover | 1873–1875 | Republican |
| | Melville J. Salter | 1875–1877 | Republican |
| | Lyman U. Humphrey | 1877–1881 | Republican |
| | David Wesley Finney | 1881–1885 | Republican |
| | Alexander P. Riddle | 1885–1889 | Republican |
| | Andrew Jackson Felt | 1889–1893 | Republican |
| | Percy Daniels | 1893–1895 | Populist |
| | James Armstrong Troutman | 1895–1897 | Republican |
| | Alexander Miller Harvey | 1897–1899 | Populist |
| | Harry E. Richter | 1899–1903 | Republican |
| | David John Hanna | 1903–1907 | Republican |
| | William James Fitzgerald | 1907–1911 | Republican |
| | Richard Joseph Hopkins | 1911–1913 | Republican |
| | Sheffield Ingalls | 1913–1915 | Republican |
| | William Yoast Morgan | 1915–1919 | Republican |
| | Charles Solomon Huffman | 1919–1923 | Republican |
| | Benjamin S. Paulen | 1923–1925 | Republican |
| | De Lanson Alson Newton Chase | 1925–1929 | Republican |
| | Jacob W. Graybill | 1929–1933 | Republican |
| | Charles W. Thompson | 1933–1937 | Republican |
| | William M. Lindsay | 1937–1939 | Democratic |
| | Carl E. Friend | 1939–1943 | Republican |
| | Jess C. Denious | 1943–1947 | Republican |
| | Frank L. Hagaman | 1947–1950 | Republican |
| | Fred Hall | 1951–1955 | Republican |
| | John McCuish | 1955–1957 | Republican |
| | Joseph W. Henkle Sr. | 1957–1961 | Democratic |
| | Harold H. Chase | 1961–1965 | Republican |
| | John Crutcher | 1965–1969 | Republican |
| | James H. DeCoursey Jr. | 1969–1971 | Democratic |
| | Reynolds Shultz | 1971–1973 | Republican |
| | Dave Owen | 1973–1975 | Republican |
| | Shelby Smith | 1975–1979 | Republican |
| | Paul Dugan | 1979–1983 | Democratic |
| | Thomas Docking | 1983–1987 | Democratic |
| | Jack D. Walker | 1987–1991 | Republican |
| | Jim Francisco | 1991–1995 | Democratic |
| | Sheila Frahm | 1995–1996 | Republican |
| | Gary Sherrer | 1996–2003 | Republican |
| | John E. Moore | 2003–2007 | Democratic |
| | Mark Parkinson | 2007–2009 | Democratic |
| | Troy Findley | 2009–2011 | Democratic |
| | Jeff Colyer | 2011–2018 | Republican |
| | Tracey Mann | 2018–2019 | Republican |
| | Lynn Rogers | 2019–2021 | Democratic |
| | David Toland | 2021–present | Democratic |
