= Cornelius Ambrose Logan =

American physician

United States Ambassador to Chile
- In office September 7, 1882 – June 16, 1885
- President: Chester A. Arthur
- Preceded by: Hugh Judson Kilpatrick
- Succeeded by: William R. Roberts
- In office July 27, 1873 – November 10, 1876
- President: Ulysses S. Grant
- Preceded by: Joseph P. Root
- Succeeded by: Thomas A. Osborn

Minister Resident to Costa Rica
- In office December 25, 1879 – April 17, 1882
- President: Rutherford B. Hayes; James A. Garfield; Chester A. Arthur
- Preceded by: George Williamson
- Succeeded by: Henry Cook Hall

Cornelius Ambrose Logan (August 24, 1832 – January 30, 1899) was an American physician, writer, and diplomat, best known for his two terms as United States Ambassador to Chile (1873-6 and 1882-5) during difficult times.

== Biography ==
Logan spent his early life in Cincinnati, Ohio. In 1849 he began to study medicine with Dr. John T. Shotwell; in 1850 he began instruction under Dr. R. D. Mussey, then serving as president of the American Medical Association. He graduated from Miami Medical College (now part of the University of Cincinnati) in 1853. In 1856 he moved to Kansas to practice medicine and was appointed chairman of the State Board of Medical Examiners at the outbreak of the Civil War. He was elected to the first city council of the new city of Atchison in 1858.

After the Civil War Logan published works on a variety of subjects - sanitary conditions, climatology, and infectious disease. He edited a posthumous work on volunteer soldiers by his cousin, General John A. Logan. He co-founded and edited a medical journal in Leavenworth, the first medical journal in Kansas. He was also part of a company trying to mine coal in northern Kansas, and he and his brother Thomas successfully lobbied Congress for a franchise to mine on government land.

Logan served as ambassador to Chile (1873–6), ambassador to Central America (1879–82), and for a second time as ambassador to Chile (1882–5). He attempted to mediate an end to the War of the Pacific, but was unsuccessful. He resigned his post in 1885 due to illness and returned to the United States. After studying in Europe, he resumed medical practice in Chicago. In 1890 he went to Europe as a commissioner of the 1893 Chicago World's Columbian Exposition. He died of Bright's disease in Los Angeles in 1899.

Logan was a member of the Independent Order of Odd Fellows; he organized the first grand lodge of Odd Fellows in Kansas and served as Grand Sire of the national organization 1872–4. While in Chile he organized the first lodge and Grand Lodge there, in Valparaíso.

Logan married Zoe Shaw in 1854; they had two children. His daughter Celia (1855–1946) married Charles H. Waterous Jr. (1861–1925), son of Canadian manufacturer Charles Horatio Waterous; the couple had met in Chile.

== Family ==
Logan came from a distinguished family, most of them actors and writers. His father, Cornelius Ambrosius Logan (1806–1853), was a successful actor who wrote a number of plays showcasing the typical "Yankee" characters he played. His sister Olive Logan (1839–1909) was an actress, lecturer, and writer; another sister, Eliza (1827–1872), had a successful stage career before marrying theatrical manager George Wood in 1859. Celia (1837–1904) was an actress but also a journalist, novelist and translator; she was for a time the wife of painter Miner Kilbourne Kellogg (1814–1889). Logan's brother Thomas Ackley Logan (1829–1906) was a prominent Ohio lawyer. Another sister, Kate Logan (died 1872), was adopted by General John A. Logan, a distant cousin, but remained close to her birth family.

== Works ==
- Reports on the Sanitary Relations of the State of Kansas (1866)
- On the Climatology of the Missouri Valley (1878)
- Physics of the Infectious Diseases (1878)

Diplomatic posts
Preceded by Joseph Pomeroy Root	United States Minister to Chile; 27 July 1873 – 10 November 1876	Succeeded by Thomas A. Osborn
Preceded by Judson Kilpatrick	United States Minister to Chile; 7 September 1882 – 16 June 1885	Succeeded by William Randall Roberts
