= Eliza Logan =

American actress

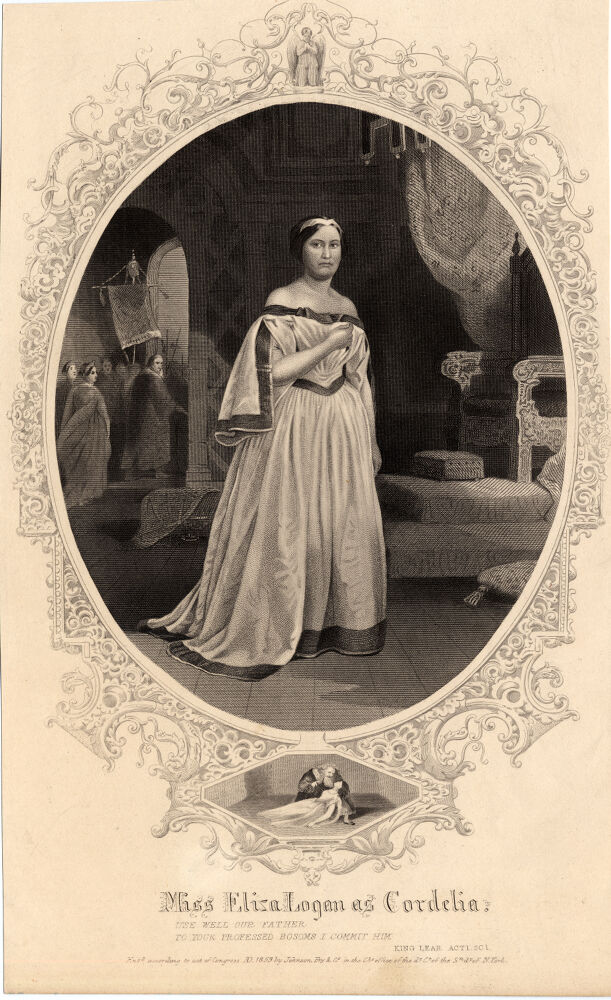
Eliza Logan as Cordelia in "King Lear", 1859

Eliza Logan Wood (born Philadelphia, Pennsylvania, August 7, 1827; died New York City, New York, January 15, 1872) was an American stage actress and member of the Logan family of actors and writers.

Probably the oldest of the eight talented children of Irish-American actor Cornelius Ambrosius Logan (1806-1853), Eliza was educated at a girls' school in Lancaster, Pennsylvania. She made her debut on the stage January 28, 1841 as Young Norval in "Douglas" at the Walnut Street Theatre in Philadelphia. Her father had moved the family to Cincinnati to manage the National Theatre there, and she continued her career there. She later toured with her father, appearing with success in the American South and West in dramas such as Shiel's Evadne. In June 1850 she made her first appearance in New York as Pauline in "The Lady of Lyons" at the Bowery Theatre. She remained a headlining actress through the 1850s, while supporting her mother and younger siblings after the death of her father in 1853.

The New York Times said she was "a charming woman, a careful actress, and played parts like Juliet and Ophelia with much feeling." Theater critic and historian T. Allston Brown called her "one of the finest female representatives of the legitimate drama known to the American stage"

She married George Wood, a theater owner and manager, in 1859 and retired from touring. She helped Wood manage his theatre properties.

Eliza Logan was a member of a family notable in the American theatre and elsewhere. Her brother Thomas (1829-1906) was a prominent Cincinnati lawyer. Her younger brother Cornelius Ambrose Logan, (1832–99), was a physician, writer, and diplomat. Middle sisters Celia (1837-1904) and Olive (1839-1909) were notable actresses and writers. The younger sisters Alice, Grace, and Kate also appeared on the stage.
