= Joseph Pomeroy Root =

American politician

United States Ambassador to Chile
- In office December 2, 1870 – June 27, 1873
- President: Ulysses S. Grant
- Preceded by: Hugh Judson Kilpatrick
- Succeeded by: Cornelius A. Logan

1st Lieutenant Governor of Kansas
- In office 1861–1863
- Governor: Charles L. Robinson
- Preceded by: Office established
- Succeeded by: Thomas A. Osborn

Member of the Connecticut House of Representatives
- In office 1855–1857

Personal details
- Born: April 23, 1826 Greenwich, Massachusetts U.S.
- Died: July 20, 1885 (aged 59) Kansas City, Kansas U.S.
- Spouse: Frances Eveline Alden
- Relations: Seth Pomeroy (great-grandfather)
- Children: 5
- Education: Berkshire Medical School

Military service
- Allegiance: Union
- Branch/service: Union Army
- Unit: 2nd Regiment Kansas Volunteer Cavalry
- Battles/wars: American Civil War

Joseph Pomeroy Root (April 23, 1826 – July 20, 1885) was an American medical doctor, politician, and leader of the Kansas Free Staters.

A descendant of an old New England family, Root was the great-grandson of Revolutionary War General Seth Pomeroy. He graduated from the Berkshire Medical College in Pittsfield and practiced medicine in New Hartford, Connecticut for five years. In 1855 he was elected to the Connecticut House of Representatives, as a Whig.

After his term, he joined an armed party of abolitionist settlers who ended up settling in Waubansee, Kansas. After Root was briefly a prisoner of pro-slavery settlers, he devoted himself to the Free State cause, ultimately becoming the chairman of the free-state executive committee. After negotiating an exchange of prisoners with pro-slavery Governor Wilson Shannon, Root left Kansas to gather funds, arms, and support among Eastern abolitionists.

On returning to Kansas, Root was elected to the territorial senate under the Topeka Constitution, and soon became president of the senate and a member of the Territorial Council. After the ratification of the Wyandotte Constitution in 1861, Root was elected as the first Lieutenant Governor of the new state.

At the outbreak of the Civil War, Root helped raise units and was a member of the state board for examining medical officers for the army. He soon joined himself as a surgeon for the 2nd Regiment Kansas Volunteer Cavalry, rising to become medical director of the Army of the Frontier.

After the Civil War Root returned to medical practice in Kansas until 1869, when he became secretary of the congressional Committee on Public Lands. In 1870 he was appointed ambassador to Chile, serving in that post until 1873. He received honors from the Chilean government for his work during a smallpox epidemic there.

Root returned to Wyandotte and resumed his practice. He retained an interest in politics and issues of the day, writing the book A Catechism of Money (1876), on the issues of gold and silver coinage and serving as a delegate to the 1884 Republican Party national convention.

Root married Frances Eveline Alden (1827–?; survived until at least 1867), a descendant of John Alden of the Mayflower, in 1851; they had 5 sons, of whom 4 survived to adulthood: Ernest, Frank, Joseph P., and John W.

Political offices
Preceded by Office established	Lieutenant Governor of Kansas; 1861–1863	Succeeded by Thomas Andrew Osborn
Diplomatic posts
Preceded by Hugh Judson Kilpatrick	United States Ambassador to Chile; 1870–1873	Succeeded by Cornelius A. Logan
