= Hugh Judson Kilpatrick =

Union United States Army general, politician (1836–1881)

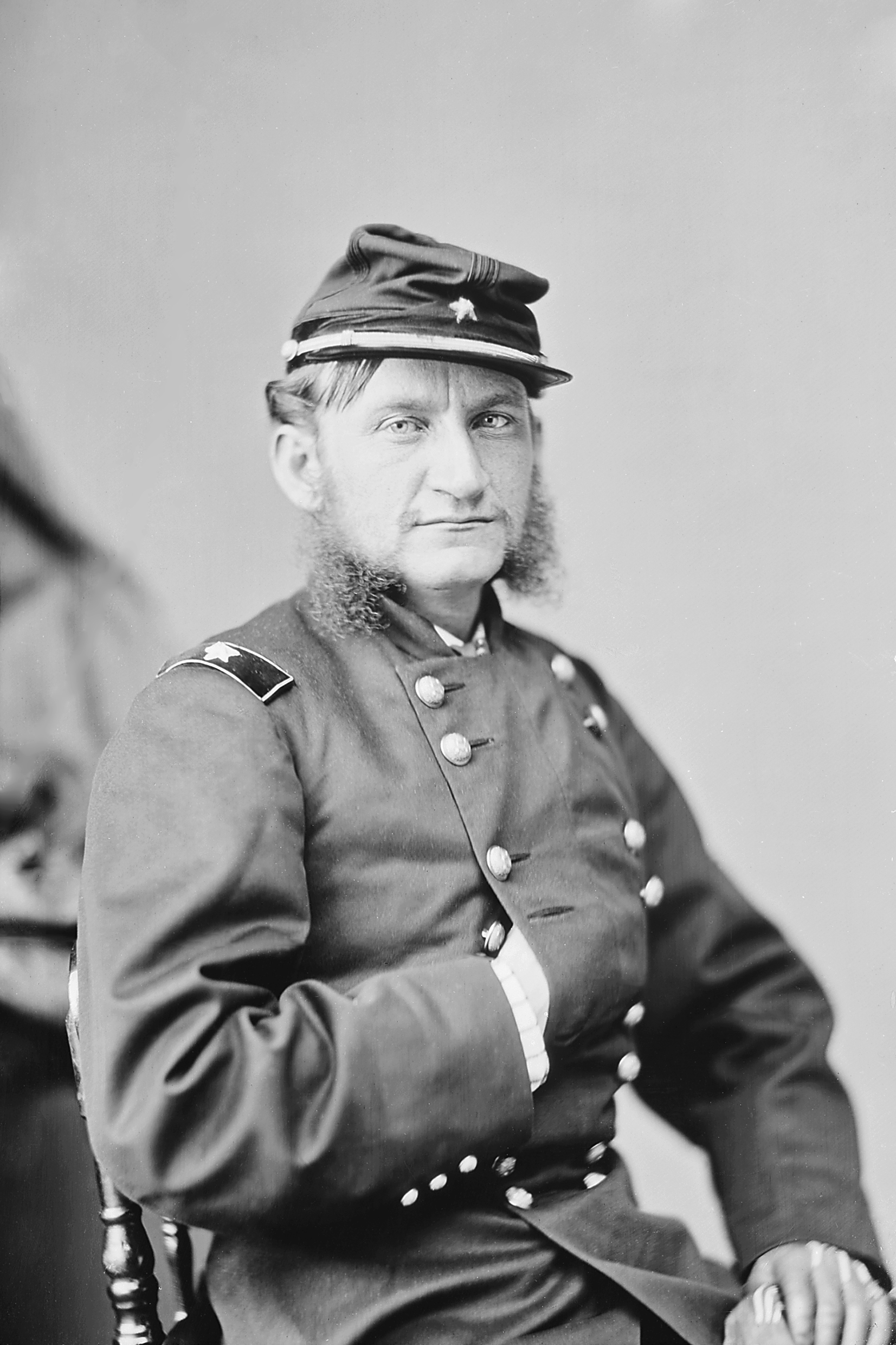
- Kilpatrick between circa 1863 and circa 1865

United States Minister to Chile
- In office July 25, 1881 – December 4, 1881
- President: James Garfield; Chester Arthur
- Preceded by: Thomas A. Osborn
- Succeeded by: Cornelius Ambrose Logan
- In office March 12, 1866 – August 3, 1870
- President: Andrew Johnson; Ulysses S. Grant
- Preceded by: Thomas H. Nelson
- Succeeded by: Joseph Pomeroy Root

Personal details
- Born: January 14, 1836 Wantage Township, near Deckertown, New Jersey, U.S. (now Sussex Borough)
- Died: December 4, 1881 (aged 45) Santiago, Chile
- Party: Republican

Military service
- Allegiance: United States of America; Union
- Branch/service: United States Army; Union army
- Years of service: 1861–1865
- Rank: Major General
- Battles/wars: American Civil War

Hugh Judson Kilpatrick (January 14, 1836 – December 4, 1881) was an officer in the Union army during the American Civil War, achieving the rank of major general. He was later the United States Minister to Chile and an unsuccessful candidate for the U.S. House of Representatives. Nicknamed "Kilcavalry" (or "Kill-Cavalry") for using tactics in battle that were considered as recklessly disregarding the lives of soldiers under his command, Kilpatrick was both praised for the victories he achieved, and despised by Southerners whose homes and towns he devastated.

== Early life ==
Hugh Judson Kilpatrick, more commonly referred to as Judson Kilpatrick, the fourth child of Colonel Simon Kilpatrick and Julia Wickham, was born on the family farm in Wantage Township, near Deckertown, New Jersey (now Sussex Borough).

== Civil War ==
Kilpatrick graduated from the United States Military Academy in 1861, just after the start of the war, and was commissioned a second lieutenant in the 1st U.S. Artillery. Within three days he was a captain in the 5th New York Infantry ("Duryée's Zouaves").

Kilpatrick was the first United States Army officer to be wounded in the Civil War, struck in the thigh by canister fire while leading a company at the Battle of Big Bethel, June 10, 1861. Felix Agnus is credited with saving his life after being injured in the battle. By September 25 he was a lieutenant colonel, now of the 2nd New York Cavalry Regiment, which he helped to raise, and it was the mounted arm that brought him fame and infamy.

Assignments were initially quiet for Lt. Col. Kilpatrick, serving in staff jobs and in minor cavalry skirmishes. That changed in the Second Battle of Bull Run in August 1862. He raided the Virginia Central Railroad early in the campaign and then ordered a twilight cavalry charge the first evening of the battle, losing a full squadron of troopers. Nevertheless, he was promoted to full colonel on December 6.

Kilpatrick was aggressive, fearless, ambitious, and blustery. He was a master, in his mid-twenties, of using political influence to get ahead. His men had little love for his manner and his willingness to exhaust men and horses and to order suicidal mounted cavalry charges. (The rifled muskets introduced to warfare in the 1850s made the historic cavalry charge essentially an anachronism. Cavalry's role shrank primarily to screening, raiding, reconnaissance and intelligence gathering.)

The widespread nickname his troopers used for Kilpatrick was "Kill Cavalry". He also had a bad reputation with others in the Army. His camps were poorly maintained and frequented by prostitutes, often visiting Kilpatrick himself. He was jailed in 1862 on charges of corruption, accused of selling captured Confederate goods for personal gain. He was jailed again for a drunken spree in Washington, D.C., and for allegedly accepting bribes in the procurement of horses for his command.

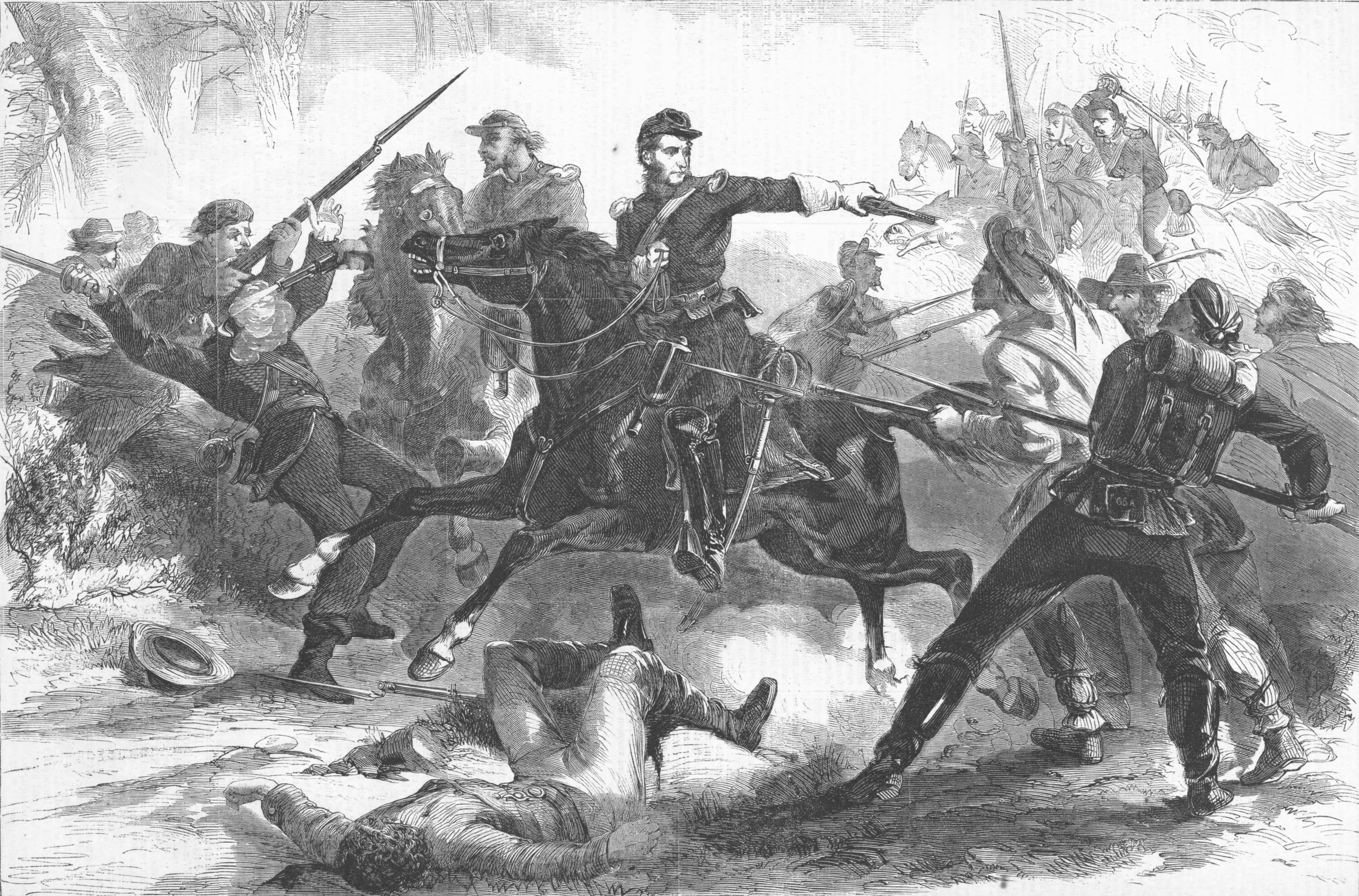
Harper's Weekly rendering of Kilpatrick's raid

In February 1863, Maj. Gen. Joseph Hooker created a Cavalry Corps in the Army of the Potomac, commanded by Maj. Gen. George Stoneman. Kilpatrick assumed command of the 1st Brigade, 2nd Division. In the Chancellorsville Campaign in May, Stoneman's cavalry was ordered to swing deeply behind Gen. Robert E. Lee's army and destroy railroads and supplies. Kilpatrick did just that, with gusto. Although the corps failed to distract Lee as intended, Kilpatrick achieved fame by aggressively capturing wagons, burning bridges, and riding around Lee, almost to the outskirts of Richmond, Virginia, in Stoneman's 1863 raid.

=== Gettysburg Campaign ===
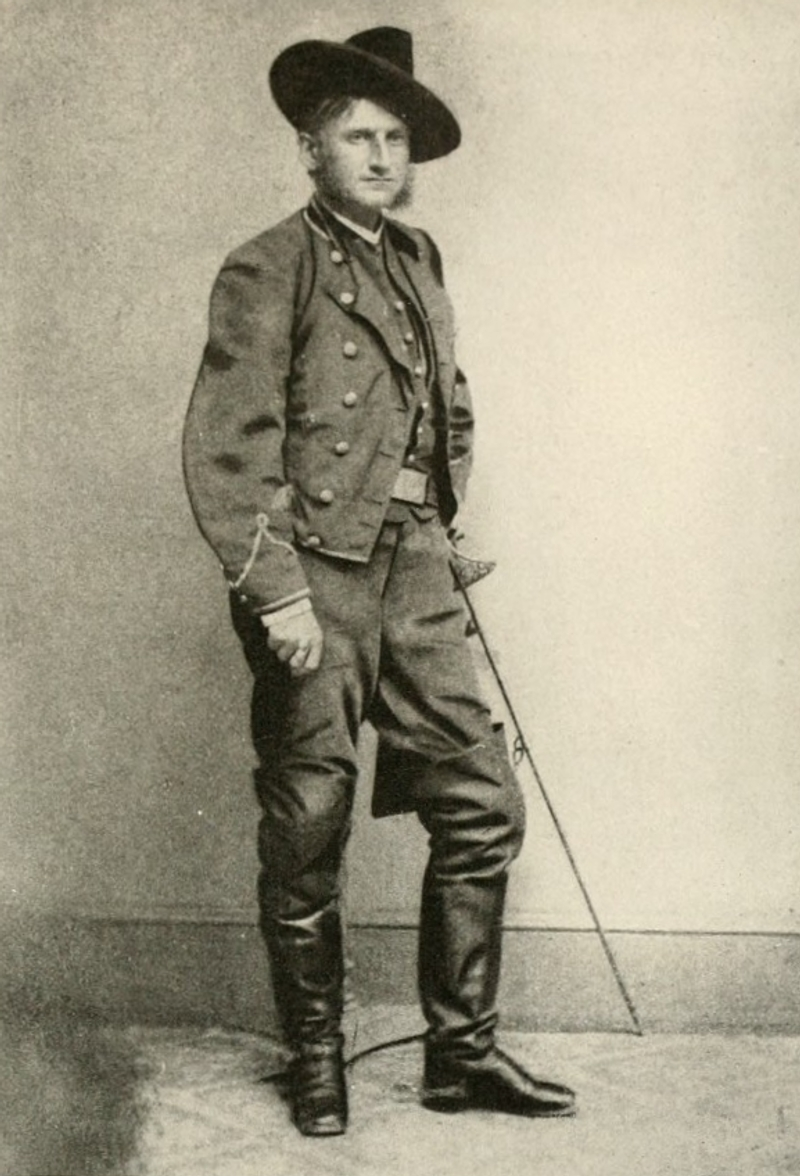
Union Cavalry General Judson Kilpatrick

At the beginning of the Gettysburg campaign, on June 9, 1863, Kilpatrick fought at Brandy Station, the largest cavalry battle of the war. He received his brigadier general's star at the age of 27 on June 13, fought at Aldie and Upperville, and assumed division command three days before the Battle of Gettysburg commenced. On June 21, he was captured at Upperville, but was quickly rescued, going on to risk his life that same day in order to rescue the wounded commander of the 5th North Carolina Cavalry. On June 30, he clashed briefly with J.E.B. Stuart's cavalry at Hanover, Pennsylvania, but then proceeded on a wild goose chase in pursuit of Stuart, rather than fulfilling his mission of intelligence gathering.

On the second day of the Gettysburg battle, July 2, 1863, Kilpatrick's division skirmished against Wade Hampton five miles northeast of town at Hunterstown. He then settled in for the night to the southeast at Two Taverns. One of his brigade commanders, Brig. Gen. George A. Custer, was ordered to join Brig. Gen. David McM. Gregg's division for the next day's action against Stuart's cavalry east of town, so Kilpatrick was down to one brigade. On July 3, after Pickett's Charge, he was ordered by army commander Maj. Gen. George G. Meade and Cavalry Corps commander Alfred Pleasonton to launch a cavalry charge against the infantry positions of Lt. Gen. James Longstreet's Corps on the Confederate right flank, just west of Little Round Top. Kilpatrick's lone brigade commander, Brig. Gen. Elon J. Farnsworth, protested against the futility of such a move. Kilpatrick essentially questioned his bravery and allegedly dared him to charge: "Then, by God, if you are afraid to go I will lead the charge myself." Farnsworth reluctantly complied with the order. He was killed in the attack and his brigade suffered significant losses.

Kilpatrick and the rest of the cavalry pursued and harassed Lee during his retreat back to Virginia. In late August, he took part in an expedition to destroy the Confederate gunboats Satellite and Reliance in the Rappahannock River, boarding them and capturing their crews successfully.

Kilpatrick's cavalry division participated in the Bristoe Campaign that October, but suffered an embarrassing defeat at its conclusion when they were lured into an ambush and routed at Buckland Mills.

In November, he received news of his young wife’s death and was absent for the Mine Run Campaign. Within two months his infant son also died.

=== The Dahlgren Affair ===
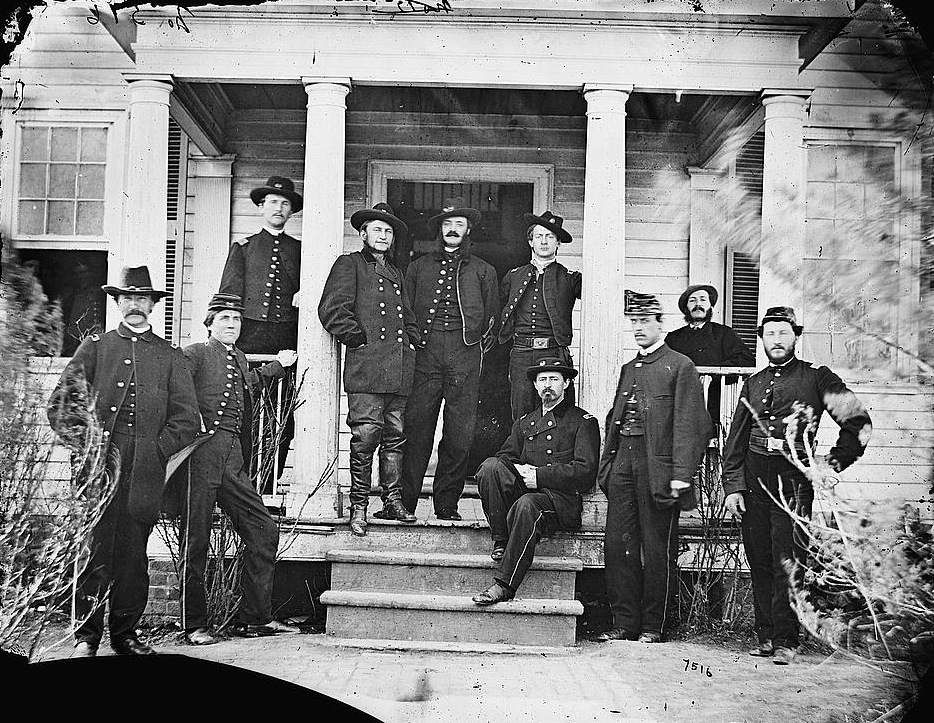
Kilpatrick and his 3rd Division staff, March 1864

Just before the start of Lt. Gen. Ulysses S. Grant's Overland Campaign in the spring of 1864, Kilpatrick conducted a raid toward Richmond and through the Virginia Peninsula, hoping to rescue Union prisoners of war held at Belle Isle and in Libby Prisons in Richmond. Kilpatrick took his division out on February 28, sneaking past Robert E. Lee's flank and driving south for Richmond. On March 1, they were within 5 miles of the city. Defenses around the city were too strong however and numerous squads of Confederate militia and cavalry nipped at their heels the whole way, including some of General Wade Hampton's troopers dispatched from the Army of Northern Virginia.

Unable to get at Richmond or return to the Army of the Potomac, Kilpatrick decided to bolt down the Virginia Peninsula where Ben Butler's Army of the James was stationed. Meanwhile, the general was dismayed to find out that Ulric Dahlgren's brigade (detached from the main force) had not made it across the James River. Eventually 300 of the latter's troopers stumbled into camp, Dahlgren and the rest seemingly vanished into thin air. The survivors reported that they had made a nightmarish journey through the countryside around Richmond in darkness and a sleet storm, the woods filled with enemy troops and hostile civilians at every turn. Dahlgren and the 200 cavalrymen he was accompanying had been told by a slave of a place where the James was shallow and could be forded. When they got there, the river was swelled up and cresting. Convinced he had been tricked, Dahlgren ordered the slave hanged. They went back north and found that Kilpatrick was gone and they were alone in a hostile country.

The troopers battled their way to the Mattaponi River, crossed, and appeared to be safe from danger, but in the dark they ran into a Confederate ambush. Dahlgren was shot dead along with many of his men, the rest being taken prisoner. His body was then displayed in Richmond as a war trophy. Papers found on the body of Dahlgren shortly after his death described the object of the expedition, apparently indicating that he intended to burn and loot Richmond and assassinate Jefferson Davis and the whole Confederate cabinet.

The raid had resulted in 324 cavalrymen killed and wounded, and 1,000 more taken prisoner. Kilpatrick's men had cut a swathe of destruction across the outskirts of Richmond, destroying tobacco barns, boats, railroad cars and tracks, and other infrastructure. They also deposited a large number of pamphlets in and around homes and other buildings offering amnesty to any Southern civilian who took the oath of loyalty to the United States. During the raid BG John H. Winder, Provost Marshal of Richmond, was so concerned that Union POWs held in Richmond Libby prison would try to escape that he ordered gunpowder placed under the building, to be detonated if they attempted to escape.

The discovery and publication of the Dahlgren Papers sparked an international controversy. General Braxton Bragg denounced the papers as "fiendish" and Confederate Secretary of War James Seddon proposed that the Union prisoners be hanged. Robert E. Lee agreed that they made for an atrocious document, but urged calm, saying that no actual destruction had taken place and the papers might very well be fakes. In addition, Lee was concerned because some Confederate guerrillas had just been captured by the Army of the Potomac, which was considering hanging them, and execution of Dahlgren's men might set off a chain reaction. The Confederate general sent the papers to George Meade under a flag of truce and asked him to provide an explanation. Meade wrote back that no burnings or assassinations had been ordered by anyone in Washington or the army.

Meanwhile, newspapers and politicians in the North and South exchanged blows. The former condemned the use of Ulric Dahlgren's corpse as a carnival attraction and the latter accused Lincoln's government of wanting to conduct indiscriminate pillage and slaughter on Virginia civilians, including the claim that Kilpatrick wanted to free Union prisoners and turn them loose on the women of Richmond. Northern papers also cheered the destruction caused by the raid and took pleasure in describing the ravaged condition of the Virginia countryside.

After reaching Ben Butler's base at Fort Monroe, Kilpatrick's men took a steamship back to Washington. More trouble followed when they were granted a few days' rest in Alexandria, Virginia before rejoining the Army of the Potomac. The city was garrisoned with African-American troops, and one stopped to inform a cavalryman that only persons on active duty were allowed to ride horses through the streets. This trooper found it insulting to take orders from a black man and promptly struck him down with his sword. Kilpatrick's division was punished by being forced to immediately embark for the Rapidan River without resting or drawing new uniforms.

The "Kilpatrick-Dahlgren" expedition was such a fiasco that Kilpatrick found he was no longer welcome in the Eastern Theater. He transferred west to command the 3rd Division of the Cavalry Corps of the Army of the Cumberland, under Maj. Gen. William Tecumseh Sherman.

=== Final campaigns through Georgia and the Carolinas ===
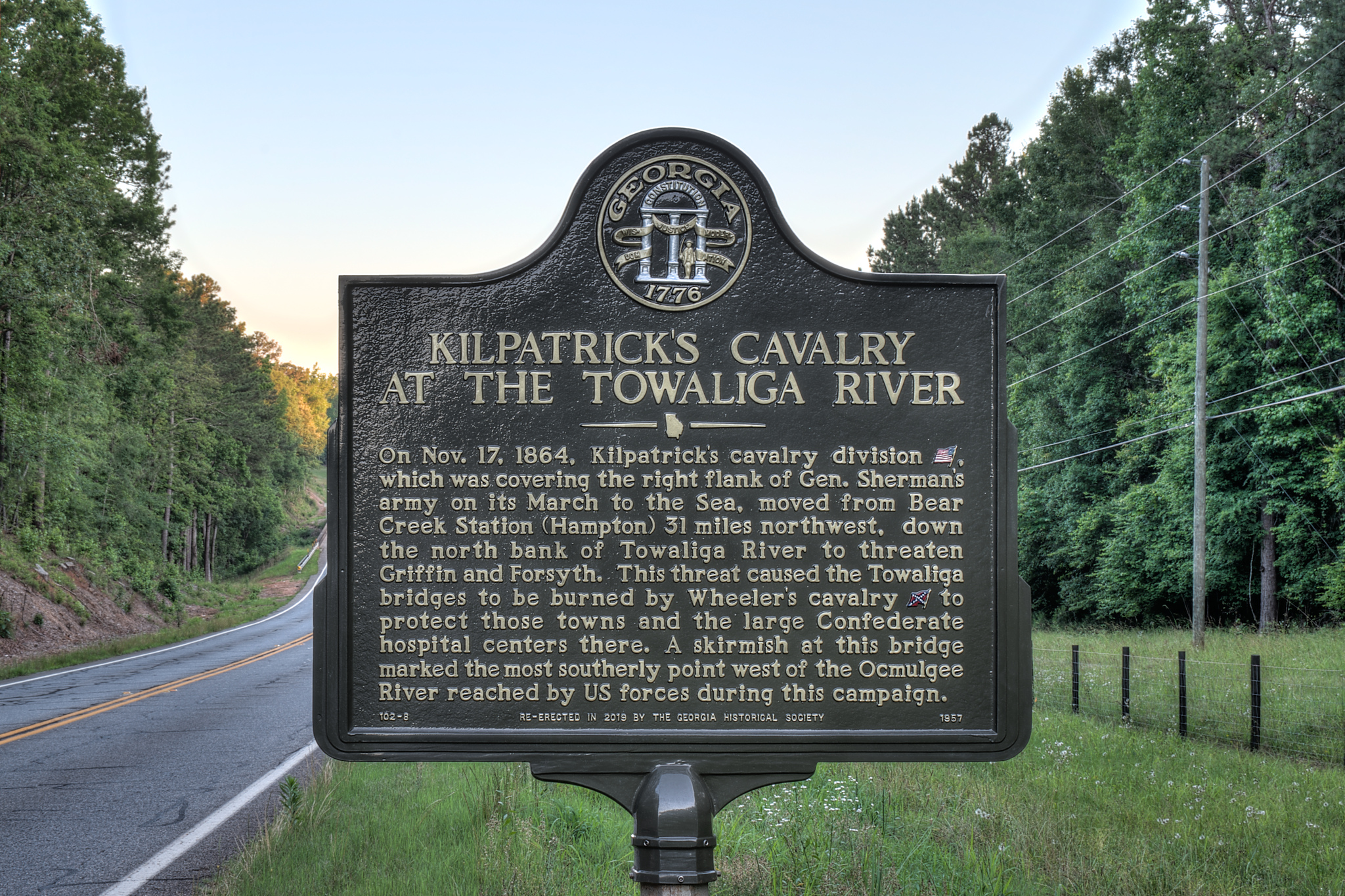
Historical marker of Kilpatrick

Summing up Judson Kilpatrick in 1864, Sherman said "I know that Kilpatrick is a hell of a damned fool, but I want just that sort of man to command my cavalry on this expedition."

Starting in May 1864, Kilpatrick rode in the Atlanta campaign. On May 13, he was severely wounded in the thigh at the Battle of Resaca and his injuries kept him out of the field until late July. He had considerable success raiding behind Confederate lines, tearing up railroads, and at one point rode his division completely around the enemy positions in Atlanta. His division played a significant role in the Battle of Jonesborough on August 31, 1864.

Kilpatrick continued with Sherman through his March to the Sea to Savannah and north in the Carolinas campaign. He delighted in destroying Southern property. On two occasions his coarse personal instincts betrayed him: Confederate cavalry under the command of Maj. Gen. Wade Hampton raided his camp while he was in bed. At the Battle of Monroe's Crossroads, he was forced to flee for his life in his underclothes until his troops could reform. Kilpatrick would march to the city of Aiken, where he would engage with troops under the command of Joseph Wheeler. Kilpatick lost the battle and forced back to his defenses at Montmorenci.

Kilpatrick was fired upon on April 13, 1865 by a reportedly drunk Texas cavalry lieutenant from Wheeler's Cavalry who said he was named Robert Walsh. Walsh fired six shots from his revolver at the approaching General and his staff while several citizens of Raleigh begged him not to, fearing the destruction of the city which had surrendered days earlier. Kilpatrick, after a brief interrogation, ordered his men to take Walsh out of sight of the women and hang him.

Kilpatrick accompanied Maj. Gen. William T. Sherman to the surrender negotiations held at Bennett Place near Durham, North Carolina, on April 17, 1865.

Kilpatrick later commanded a division of the Cavalry Corps in the Military Division of the Mississippi from April to June 1865, and was promoted to major general of volunteers on June 18, 1865. He resigned from the Army on December 1, 1865.

== Later life ==
Hugh Judson Kilpatrick

Kilpatrick was an early member of the Military Order of the Loyal Legion of the United States, a military society composed of officers who had served in the Union armed forces and their descendants. He was elected a First Class Companion in the Pennsylvania Commandery on November 1, 1865 and was assigned insignia number 63.

Kilpatrick became active in politics as a Republican and in 1880 was an unsuccessful candidate for the U.S. Congress from New Jersey.

In November 1865, Kilpatrick was appointed Minister to Chile by President Andrew Johnson. This appointment was announced concurrently with the inclusion of Kilpatrick's name on a list of Republicans arrested for bribery. He was continued as Minister by President Grant.

As American Minister to Chile, Kilpatrick was involved in an attempt to arbitrate between the combatants of the Chincha Islands War after the Valparaiso bombardment (1866). The attempt failed, as the chief condition of Spanish admiral Méndez Núñez was the return of the captured Covadonga. Kilpatrick asked the American naval commander Commander John Rodgers to defend the port and attack the Spanish fleet. Admiral Méndez Núñez famously responded with, "I will be forced to sink [the US ships], because even if I have one ship left I will proceed with the bombardment. Spain, the Queen and I prefer honor without ships to ships without honor." ("España prefiere honra sin barcos a barcos sin honra.")

Kilpatrick was recalled in 1870. The 1865 appointment seems to have been the result of a political deal. Kilpatrick had been a candidate for the Republican nomination for governor of New Jersey but lost out to Marcus Ward. For helping Ward, Kilpatrick was rewarded with the post in Chile. Due to the Grant administration recalling him, Kilpatrick supported Horace Greeley in the 1872 presidential election. By 1876, Kilpatrick returned to the Republicans and supported Rutherford B. Hayes for the presidency.

In Chile he married his second wife, Luisa Fernandez de Valdivieso (1836-1928), a member of a wealthy family of Spanish origin that had emigrated to South America in the 17th century. They had two daughters.

In March 1881, in recognition of Kilpatrick's service to the Republicans in New Jersey as well as a consolation prize for his defeat for a House seat, President James Garfield appointed Kilpatrick again to the post of Minister to Chile, where he died shortly after his arrival in the Chilean capital Santiago. His remains returned to the United States in 1887 and were interred at the West Point Cemetery in West Point, New York.

Kilpatrick was the author of two plays, Allatoona: An Historical and Military Drama in Five Acts (1875) and The Blue and the Gray: Or, War is Hell (posthumous, 1930).

== Legacy ==
Battery Kilpatrick at Fort Sherman, on the Atlantic end of the Panama Canal, was named for Judson Kilpatrick.

The World War II Liberty Ship SS Hugh J. Kilpatrick was named in his honor.

The Major General Judson Kilpatrick Camp No. 7, Sons of Union Veterans of the Civil War, was formed in September, 2021 in Cary, North Carolina. The camp was named in honor of the general.

== See also ==
- Battle of Gettysburg, Third Day cavalry battles
- List of American Civil War generals (Union)

Diplomatic posts
Preceded by Thomas H. Nelson	United States Minister to Chile; March 12, 1866 – August 3, 1870	Succeeded by Joseph P. Root
Preceded by Thomas A. Osborn	United States Minister to Chile; July 25, 1881 – December 2, 1881	Succeeded by Cornelius A. Logan
