= Celia Logan =

American dramatist

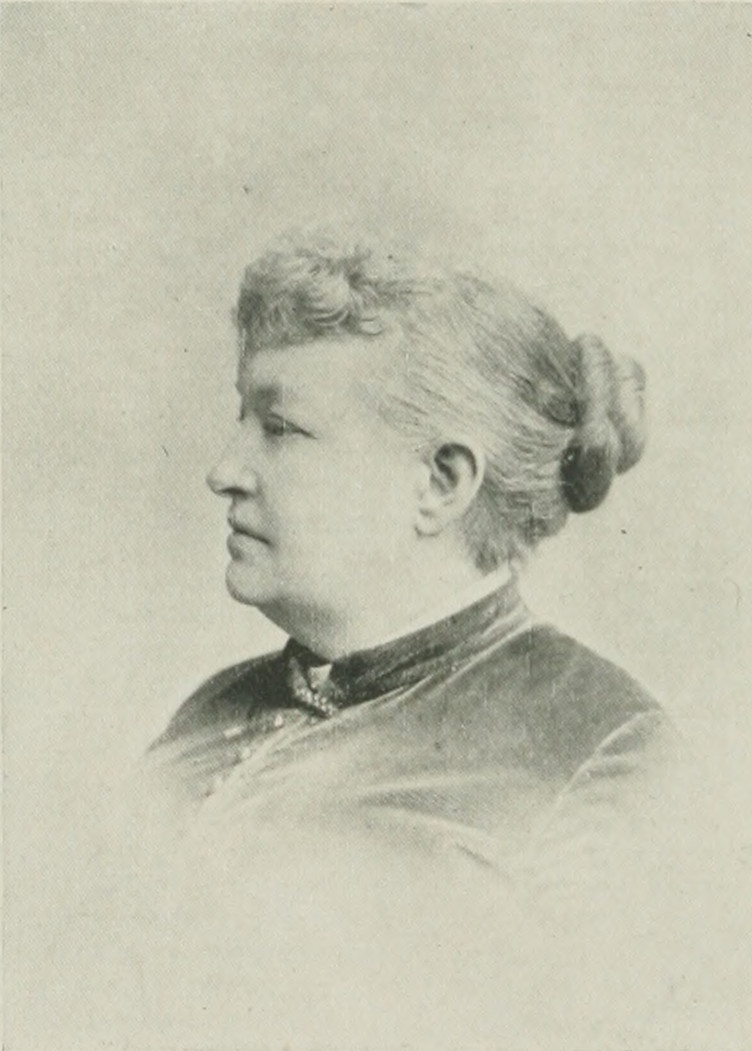
- "A Woman of the Century"
- Born: December 17, 1837; Philadelphia, Pennsylvania, U.S.
- Died: June 18, 1904 (aged 66); New York City, New York, U.S.
- Occupations: actress, playwright, writer, translator
- Spouses: Conrad B. Clarke (m. 1852; died 1859) Miner Kilbourne Kellogg (m. 1858; div. 1865) James Connelly (m. 1872; died 1903)
- Relatives: Cornelius Ambrosius Logan (father), Cornelius Ambrose Logan (brother), Olive Logan (sister), Eliza Logan (sister), John A. Logan (distant cousin)
- Writing career
- Language: English

Celia Logan (December 17, 1837 – June 18, 1904) was an American actress, playwright, and writer, and a member of the Logan family of actors and writers. She became a correspondent of American journals and wrote for magazines. During the American Civil War, she resided in Milan, Italy, translating the war news for newspapers. Afterwards she settled in Washington, D.C., where she became associate editor of The Capital. She wrote several dramas, including An American Marriage.

== Early years and education ==
Celia Logan was born December 17, 1837, in Philadelphia, Pennsylvania. (Note: Willard & Livermore record her as being born in 1840. Leonard & Marquis record 1837.) Raised mostly in Cincinnati where her father Cornelius Ambrosius Logan ran the National Theatre, Connelly came from a theatrical family. Her father and older sister, Eliza, were already well-known actors when Celia first appeared on the stage in March 1852, at the Chestnut Street Theatre in Philadelphia.

In girlhood, Celia was a writer of verse. She graduated from a private academy.

== Career ==
Her marriage to actor Conrad B. Clarke in December 1852 was ended by his death of consumption in November 1859. After a few years of acting, she travelled to Europe where she obtained a position reading manuscripts for a London publisher. While in London, she was acquainted with author Charles Reade, who encouraged her to write. On February 17, 1858, she married painter and art collector Miner Kilbourne Kellogg, more than 20 years her senior, in Paris. They had one child, Virginia Somers Kellogg, born April 25, 1860, in London. She became a London correspondent for several American newspapers. The Kelloggs returned to America after the Civil War and settled in Washington, D.C., where they were divorced in December 1865. Miner Kellogg retained custody of their child.

Logan soon returned to London, where she returned to the stage in 1868. After acting for a few seasons, she returned to newspaper work and writing for American magazines. On December 21, 1872, she married James H. Connelly (1840-1903), a journalist, writer, and Theosophist. Moving to San Francisco, James became the editor of the Morning Chronicle while Celia became a correspondent for the New York Graphic and continued to write. While in San Francisco, Celia wrote her first plays (Rose and The Old Trick), which were produced with success in San Francisco and elsewhere. Returning to New York, she became an assistant editor at Belford's Magazine, a project of Abram S. Piatt and his brother Donn, who had earlier employed her at the Capital newspaper in Washington, D.C. She also continued to write, as a journalist, as an author, and as a playwright. Her most successful plays were Gaston Cadol (an adaption from the French) and An American Marriage (1884) (later titled That Man). She had much success as a translator and adapter of French novels and plays. In addition to her original writing, she did much work as a translator from the French and Italian. Her first efforts in that field were made in converting American war news from English into Latin. Like her sister, Olive, she wrote of her experiences in the theatre, writing a series of articles entitled "These Our Actors" and also lecturing on the subject.

Logan was involved with the Ladies Lecture Bureau, an organization which organized lectures and events to raise awareness of and relief funds for the Irish famine. Logan helped organize a benefit at New York City's Grand Opera House January 22, 1880, with Cynthia Leonard; afterwards, the Bureau collapsed amid accusations by Logan and others that Leonard kept some of the money.

Celia Logan died in New York City, New York, June 18, 1904, of arteriosclerosis and a cerebral hemorrhage.

== Selected works ==
- The Elopement: A Story of the Confederate States of America (1863; as "L. Fairfax") novel
- Rose: Or, The Mystery of the Deserted House (published 1874) play
- A Marriage in High Life (1876) translation of novel by Octave Feuillet
- The Odd Trick (1873) play
- The Homestead (1873) play
- An American Marriage (later That Man; 1884) play
- Gaston Cadol (1888?) play; an adaption of the French play Jean Dacier by Charles Lomon
- Her Strange Fate (1888) novel
- Sarz, a Story of the Stage (1891) novel
- How to Reduce Your Weight, or Increase It (1892)
