= Battle of Aiken =

Battle of the American Civil War

- Part of the American Civil War
Date	February 11, 1865
Location	Aiken, South Carolina 33°33′33″N 81°43′18″W
Result	Confederate victory

Belligerents
United States (Union)	Confederate States

Commanders and leaders
(United States) Hugh Judson Kilpatrick	(Confederate States of America) Joseph Wheeler

Strength
Unknown	4,500

Casualties and losses
45–495	50–251
- Location within South Carolina

The Battle of Aiken (also known as the Action at Aiken) occurred on February 11, 1865 and was part of the Carolinas campaign. The principal commanders were Union Maj. Gen. Hugh Judson Kilpatrick and Confederate Maj. Gen. Joseph Wheeler. Wheeler was able to score a minor victory over Kilpatrick. Today, an annual re-enactment is held the final full weekend in February. As of May 2022, 28 reenactments of Aiken have been held.

== Battle ==
=== Fighting ===
Before the battle, on February 1, General Sherman began his invasion of South Carolina. During the campaign he ordered Hugh Judson Kilpatrick and his cavalry corps from the Fifth U.S Cavalry to march through South Carolina. By February 5, he crossed into Aiken County where he would engage in battle with Joseph Wheeler's cavalry corps. Wheeler attacked Kilpatrick, who expected little resistance, despite having orders to not pursue Kilpatrick's cavalry. Wheeler moved to defend the city of Augusta from the Union army. His army was stationed at 204 Park Avenue between Benjamin Franklin Cheatham and James Argle Smith's forces. The Aiken Home Guard and a cavalry corps were under Wheeler's command. He planned to defeat Kilpatrick by forming his cavalry into a V-shaped formation with skirmishers deployed above it. When Kilpatrick charged the skirmishers, they would retreat into the center of the "V." Once Kilpatrick entered the formation the tips of the "V" would collapse, thus encircling Kilpatrick. On February 11, at 9:00 AM, the battle started.

Wheeler's plan was prevented from coming to fruition due to a single Confederate soldier who prematurely fired their gun, resulting in Wheeler ordering all of his soldiers to attack the Union forces. The armies engaged in hand-to-hand combat throughout the town. During the fighting, it was reported that a Confederate soldier ran up to Kilpatrick and attacked the general with his pistol. However, the pistol did not fire. After Kilpatrick was defeated, he retreated back to his defenses at Montmorenci. For the rest of the day, Confederate and Union soldiers skirmished. This continued until the two commanders signed a truce and agreed to collect the bodies. Later, on February 13, Kilpatrick retreated and rejoined Sherman. Despite this, Kilpatrick declared himself victorious. In the aftermath of the battle, Wheeler's decision to attack Kilpatrick left the Edisto River, and in turn Columbia, vulnerable.

=== Casualties ===
According to General Kilpatrick, he had killed 31 Confederate soldiers, wounded 160, and captured 60. This would result in the Confederates taking 251 Casualties. However general Wheeler states that he had suffered 50 casualties and that he had killed 53 Union soldiers, wounded 270, and captured 172. This totals to 495 Union Casualties.

== In popular culture ==
To commemorate the battle, a granite monument was erected at the intersection of Richland Avenue and Chesterfield Street. The people of the country reenact the battle annually on rural land located several miles away from the area where the battle was actually fought. According to the Southern Cultures journal, the residents of the city possibly reenact this battle as an attempt to score a "symbolic blow against the hated enemy of their ancestors and perhaps, against what they see as their enemies modern counterparts: The Civil Rights Movement, which intervenes in their lives in unwanted (as well as welcome) ways." The first reenactment of the battle happened in 1965. It was organized by John A May and Herman Boland. Both of these men were descendants of Confederate veterans. According to the Southern Cultures journal, the tradition of reenacting the battle had become "suspect." Resulting in the people of the town trying to "hold on to their 'southernerness'" by defending the practice. In 2005 Christopher Forbes and with Michael G. Hennessy directed and co-wrote The Battle of Aiken, a film about this battle.
