= Cornelius Ambrosius Logan =

American poet

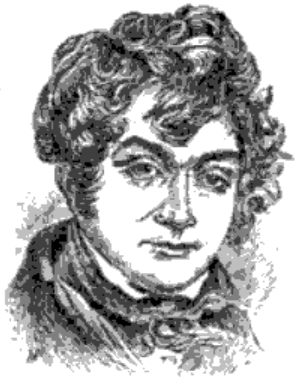
- Born: May 4, 1806; Baltimore, Maryland
- Died: February 23, 1853 (aged 46); Ohio River, Virginia
- Education: St. Mary's Seminary
- Occupations: Actor, playwright, journalist
- Spouse: Eliza Acheley (m. 1825)
- Children: Alice Logan; Celia Logan; Cornelius Ambrose Logan; Eliza Logan; Grace Logan; Kate Logan; Olive Logan; Thomas Logan

Cornelius Ambrosius Logan (May 4, 1806 – February 23, 1853) was an American actor, playwright, and journalist who was father to a famous family of actresses and writers.

== Biography ==
Born in Baltimore to Irish immigrant parents, Logan was educated for the Catholic priesthood at St. Mary's Seminary in Baltimore, but then entered a shipping house, where his work led him to travel to Europe several times. He next became a journalist, and after working as a drama critic began to write plays and act himself. A series of stories starring the cloaked crime-fighter and supporter of the working man "Night Hawk", published in the Philadelphia labor union newspaper Mechanic's Free Press from 1828 to 1830, helped make his reputation. He moved to Cincinnati with his growing family in 1840 where he operated the "National Theater". He later operated theaters in other cities and traveled with his oldest daughter Eliza, playing comic "yankee" roles. He also wrote short stories, poetry, notably a well-regarded Ode to the Mississippi, and a defence of the theater against criticism from the pulpit.

He died onboard the steamer Pittsburg on the Ohio River between Marietta, Ohio and Wheeling, Virginia on February 23, 1853.

== Family ==
Logan was married in 1825 to Eliza Acheley, and their children were: Eliza (1827–1872), a successful actress; Thomas (1829–1906), a prominent Cincinnati lawyer; Cornelius Ambrose (1832–1899), a physician, writer, and diplomat; Celia (1837–1904), an actress, journalist, translator, and novelist; Olive (1839–1909), an actress and writer and lecturer on the theater; and younger sisters Alice, Grace, and Kate, all of whom appeared on the stage for a time. Kate (1847-1872) was adopted by politician and Civil War hero John A. Logan, a distant cousin, probably in 1866.

Alice (1844-1917) suffered a mental breakdown on the day of her marriage to actor and writer Albert W. Aiken in 1871; she died many years later in a Norristown, Pennsylvania insane asylum. Olive also died in an asylum, in England, although she only became incapacitated in the last years of her life.

== Theatrical works ==
- Yankee Land, or The Foundling of the Apple Orchard (1834) (popularly performed in by Dan Marble)
- The Wag of Maine (1835)
- The Vermont Wool Dealer (1840?) (also performed in by Marble)
- Removing the Deposits
- Astarte
- The Celestial Empire; Or, The Yankee in China (1846)
- Chloroform, or New York a Hundred Years Hence (1849)
