= Olive Logan =

American actress

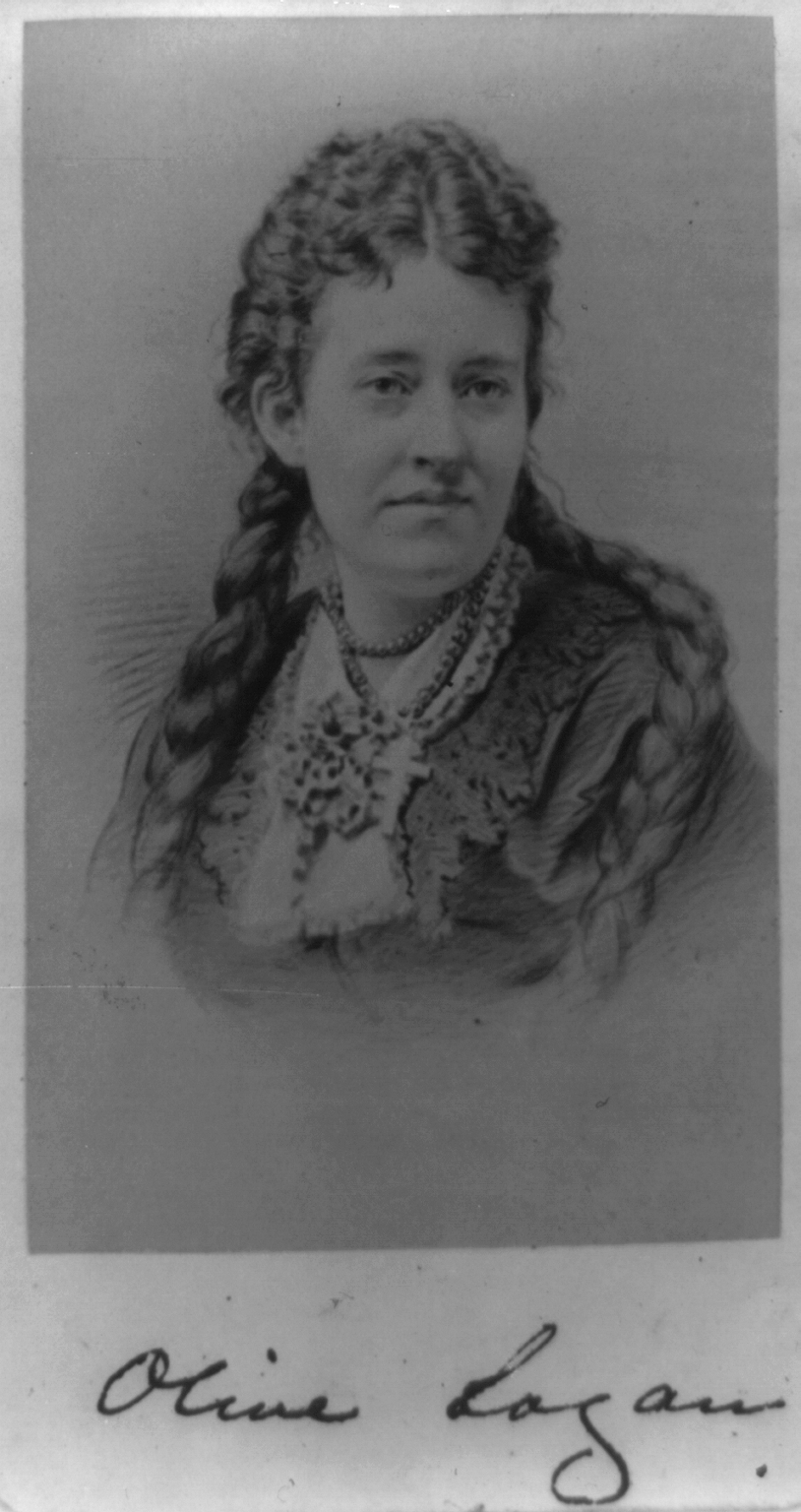
- Born: April 22, 1839; Elmira, New York, United States
- Died: April 27, 1909 (aged 70); Banstead, Surrey, England
- Occupations: Stage actress, writer
- Parent: Cornelius Ambrosius Logan

Olive Logan (April 22, 1839 – April 27, 1909) was an American actress and author, daughter of Irish-American actor and playwright Cornelius Ambrosius Logan and Eliza Akeley.

== Career ==
She was born in Elmira, New York, and attended Wesleyan Female College (1850–51) and the Catholic Academy of the Sacred Heart in Cincinnati, Ohio, where her theatrical family had settled. Her acting career was short, beginning with her debut at the Arch Street Theatre in Philadelphia in 1854 as 'Mrs. Bobtail' in Bobtail and Wagtail and ending in 1857 when she married journalist Henry A. Delisle (Note: Spelled "Delille" in some sources.) and went to Europe. While in Europe she became a journalist herself; her first book, Photographs of Paris Life (1861), was a collection of pieces on Paris life written for American periodicals. An 1865 novel, Chateau Frissac: or, Home Scenes in France, "was written with the view of showing the evils resulting from the well-known French mariage de convenance" Her 1866 story collection Olive Logan's New Christmas Story: John Morris's Money was reviewed as "not notably worse than most of the fiction of the day". Olive was influenced by Artemus Ward to take up public speaking where she spoke on social and political topics. She returned briefly to the stage from 1864 until 1867. In 1864 she appeared at Wallack's Theatre in New York City in her own play of Eveleen. She corresponded for many periodicals and wrote, besides plays (including a metrical rendering of Coppée's La Pasant), a dramatization of Wilkie Collins's Armadale, and several books on theatrical matters, such as Before the Footlights and Behind the Scenes (1870). She also published the novels Get Thee Behind Me, Satan! (1872) and They Met By Chance (1873).

Logan was divorced from Delisle in 1869.

Some of Logan's lectures were on woman suffrage; she spoke at the 1869 convention of the American Equal Rights Association and was a contributor to The Revolution.

She was a member of the Woman's National Press Association.

== Family and personal life ==
Olive was the fifth of the eight children of Irish-American actor and playwright Cornelius Ambrosius Logan. Her older siblings were stage actress Eliza Logan (1827–1872), prominent Cincinnati lawyer Thomas A. Logan (1829–1906), physician/writer/diplomat Cornelius Ambrose Logan (1832–1899), and actress and writer Celia Logan (1837–1904). Her younger sisters Alice (1844–1917), Grace, and Kate (1847–1872) also appeared on the stage; notably Alice and Grace performed in the American debut of Lydia Thompson, considered the first burlesque performance in America, at Wood's Museum in New York in September 1868; the theater was owned by George Wood, Eliza's husband.

Olive was married three times; first in 1857 to journalist Henry De Lisle; they were divorced in 1869. They had at least one son, John Douglass De Lisle, who was the US consul in Bristol, England when he died of a cold in 1890. Her second marriage was to journalist and writer Wirt Sikes on December 19, 1871. Sikes was appointed US Consul in Cardiff in 1876, and they lived there until his death in 1883. Logan married her secretary, James O'Neill in London in 1892. They moved back to New York, but by 1906 he was an alcoholic, employed only as a watchman at Ellis Island, and, mostly deaf and destitute, Logan moved to England. Logan was aided in her time of need by her friend suffragist Tennessee Claflin. She died in an insane asylum in Banstead on April 27, 1909.

== Mark Twain's opinion ==
Mark Twain evidently had a low opinion of Olive Logan; referring to her career as a lecturer, he said of her in his autobiography, "Olive Logan's notoriety grew out—only the initiated knew what. Apparently it was a manufactured notoriety, not an earned one. She did write and publish little things in newspapers and obscure periodicals, but there was no talent in them, and nothing resembling it. In a century they would not have made her known. Her name was really built up out of newspaper paragraphs set afloat by her husband, who was a small-salaried minor journalist."
