= Miner Kilbourne Kellogg =

American artist (1814–1889)

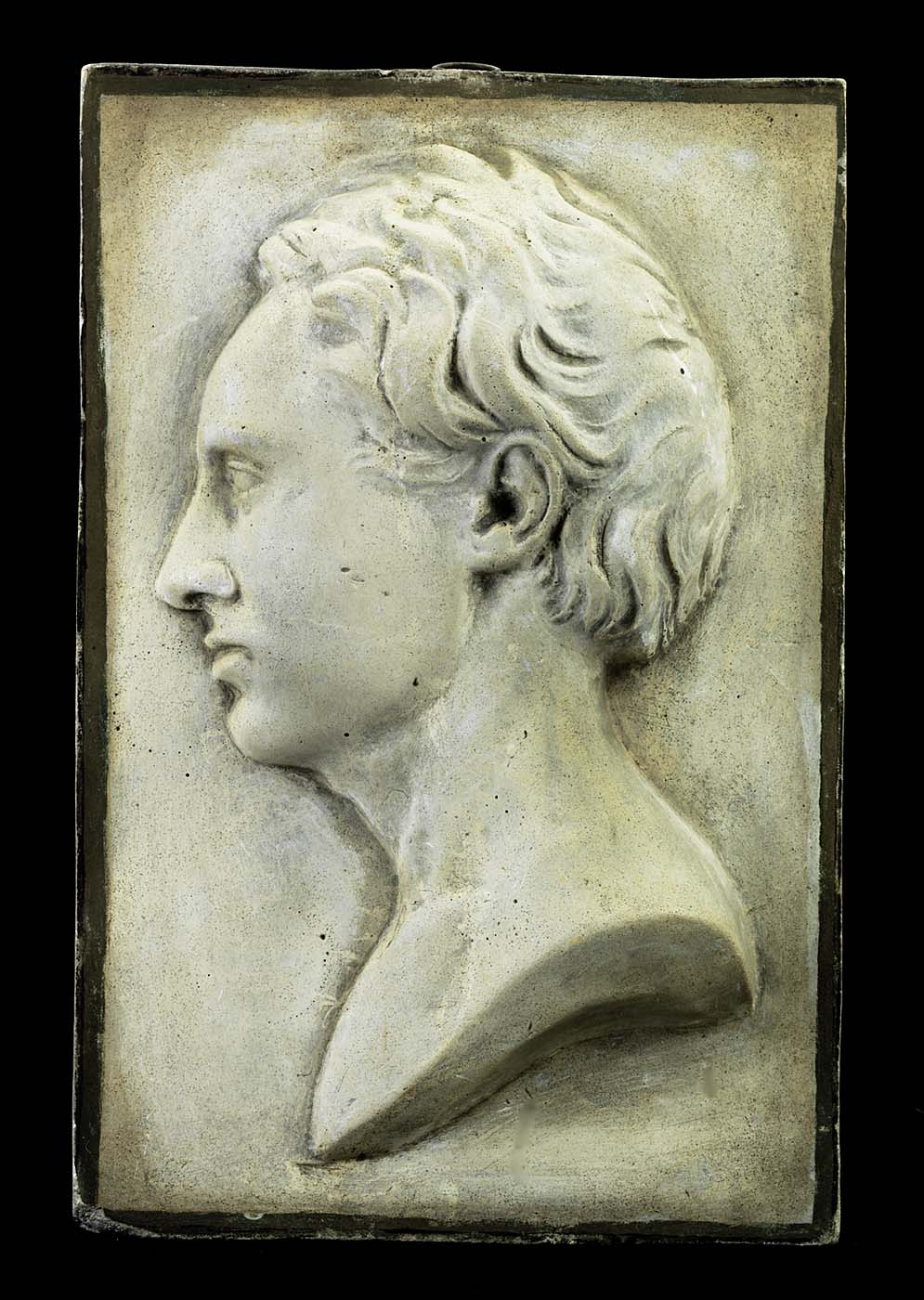
- A relief of Miner Kilbourne Kellogg, 1839, by Shobal Vail Clevenger
- Born: 1814; Manlius Square, New York
- Died: 1889 (aged 74–75)
- Known for: Painter, art historian and art collector
- Movement: Orientalist
- Spouse: Celia Logan

Miner Kilbourne Kellogg (1814-1889) was an American painter noted for his Orientalist work, an art historian and art collector.

== Life and career ==
Kellogg was born in Manlius Square, New York in 1814. He painted primarily portraits, figures and landscapes. At one time he worked as a courier on behalf of the United States Department of State. As a courier he traveled to Europe. Kellogg also was a land surveyor in Texas. He also was an art historian and an art collector. His personal art collection included works attributed to Leonardo da Vinci and Raphael. He died in Toledo, Ohio in 1889.

His archives are held in the collections of the University of Texas at Austin and the Indiana Historical Society. In 1851 he was elected into the National Academy of Design as an Honorary Academician.

== Notable collections ==
- Persian Women, Smithsonian American Art Museum, Washington, D.C.

== Works ==
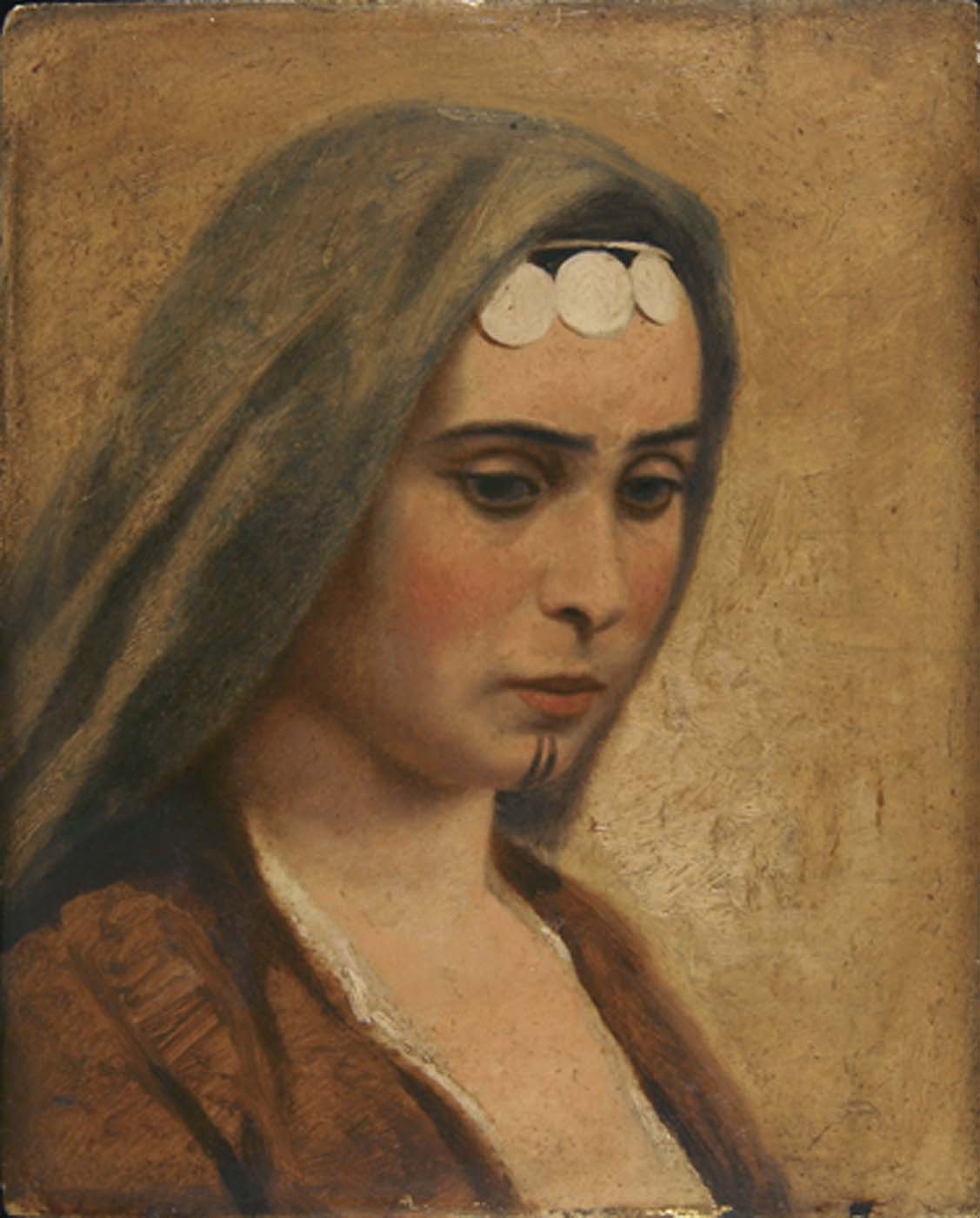
Head of an Arab Girl, Smithsonian American Art Museum

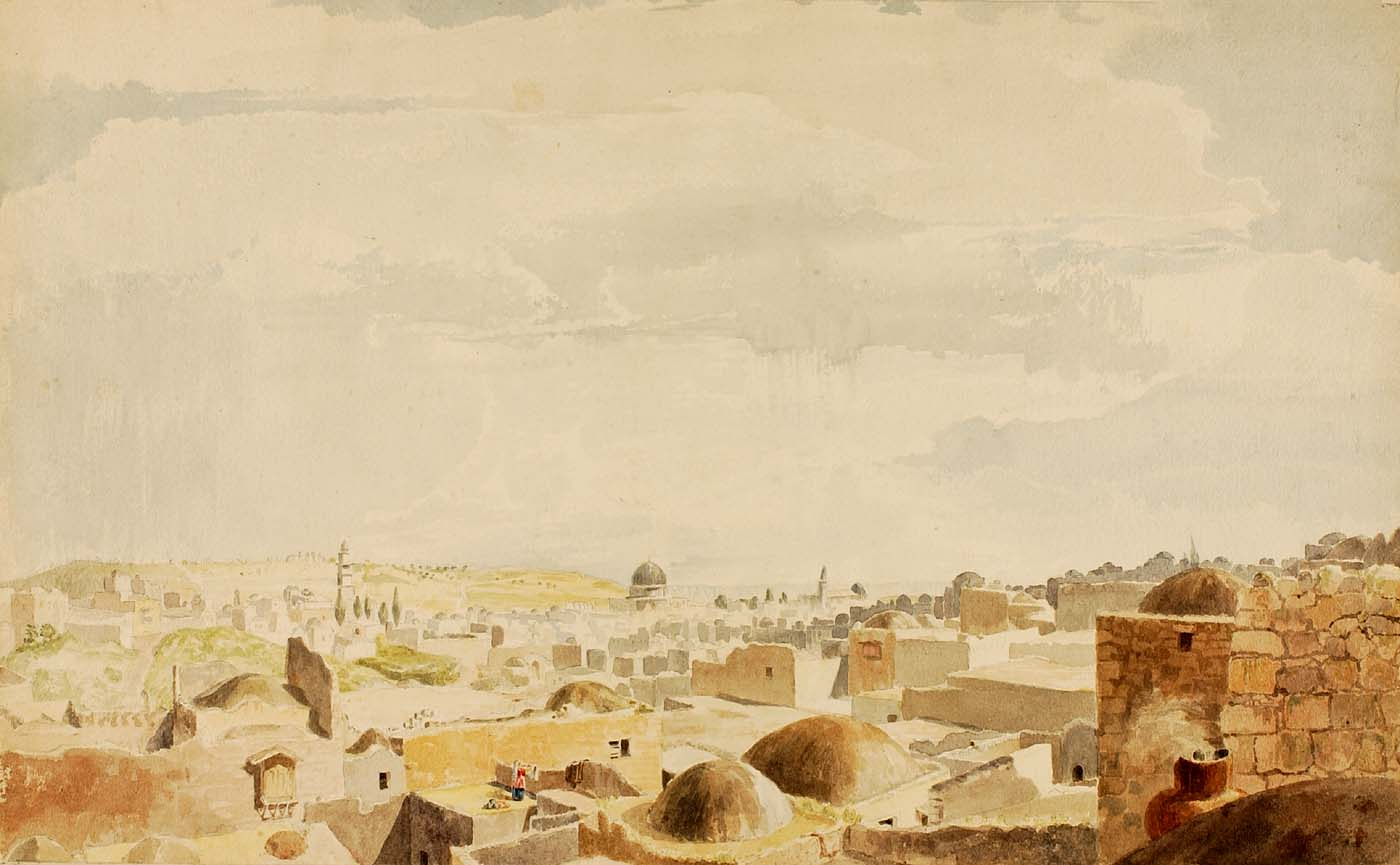
Jerusalem, Israel, Smithsonian American Art Museum

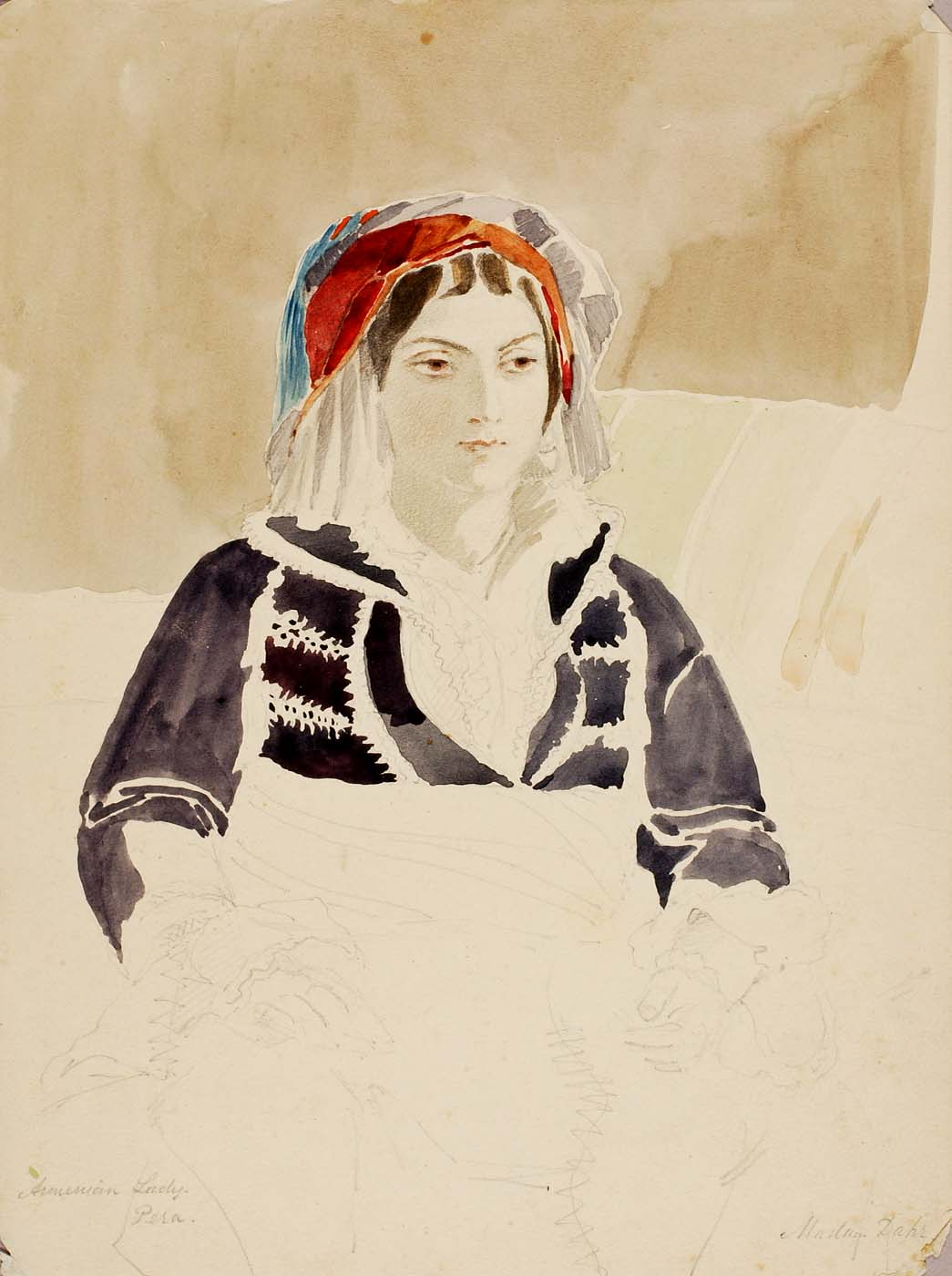
Armenian Lady, Pera, Smithsonian American Art Museum

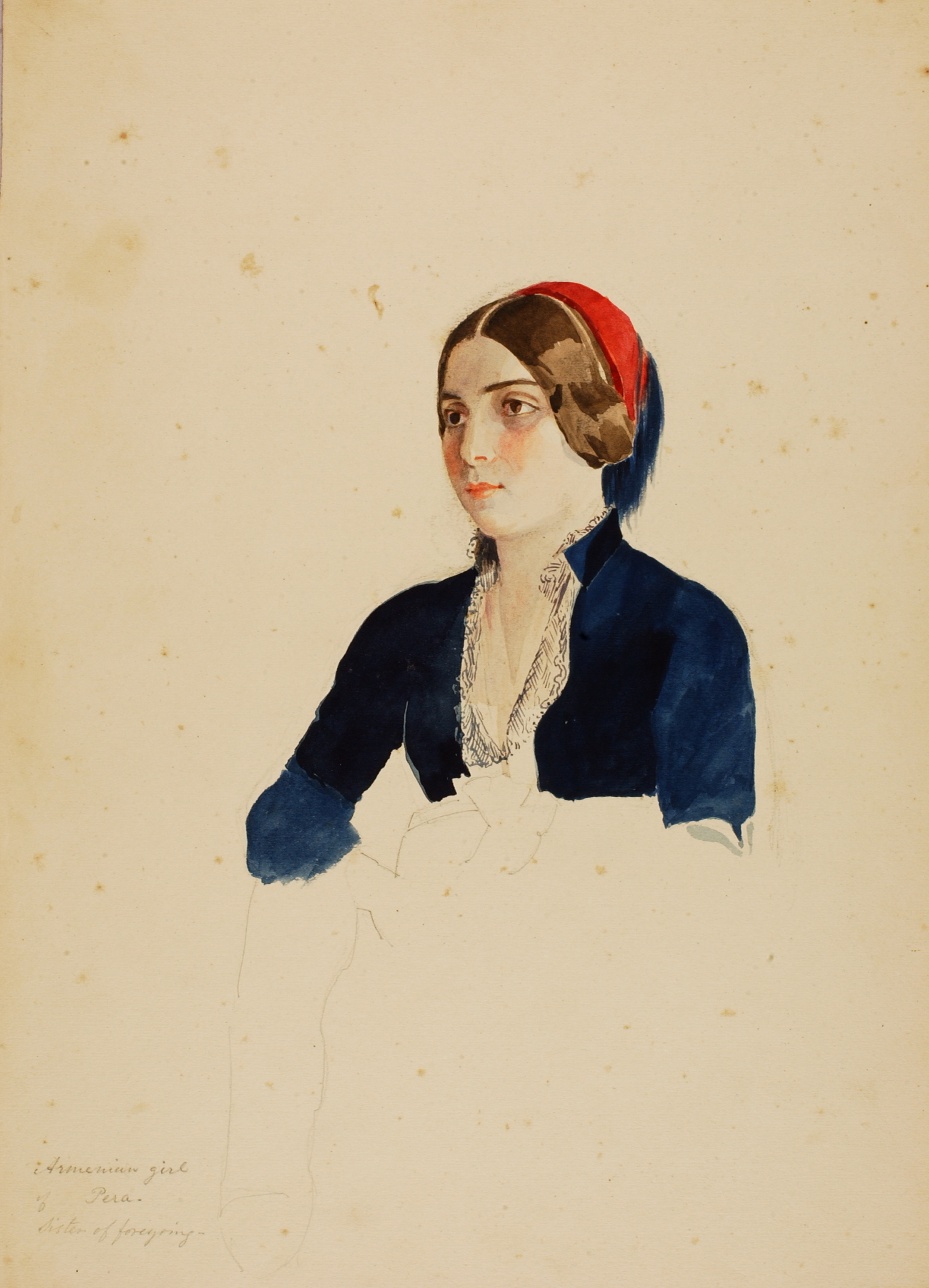
Armenian Girl of Pera, Smithsonian American Art Museum

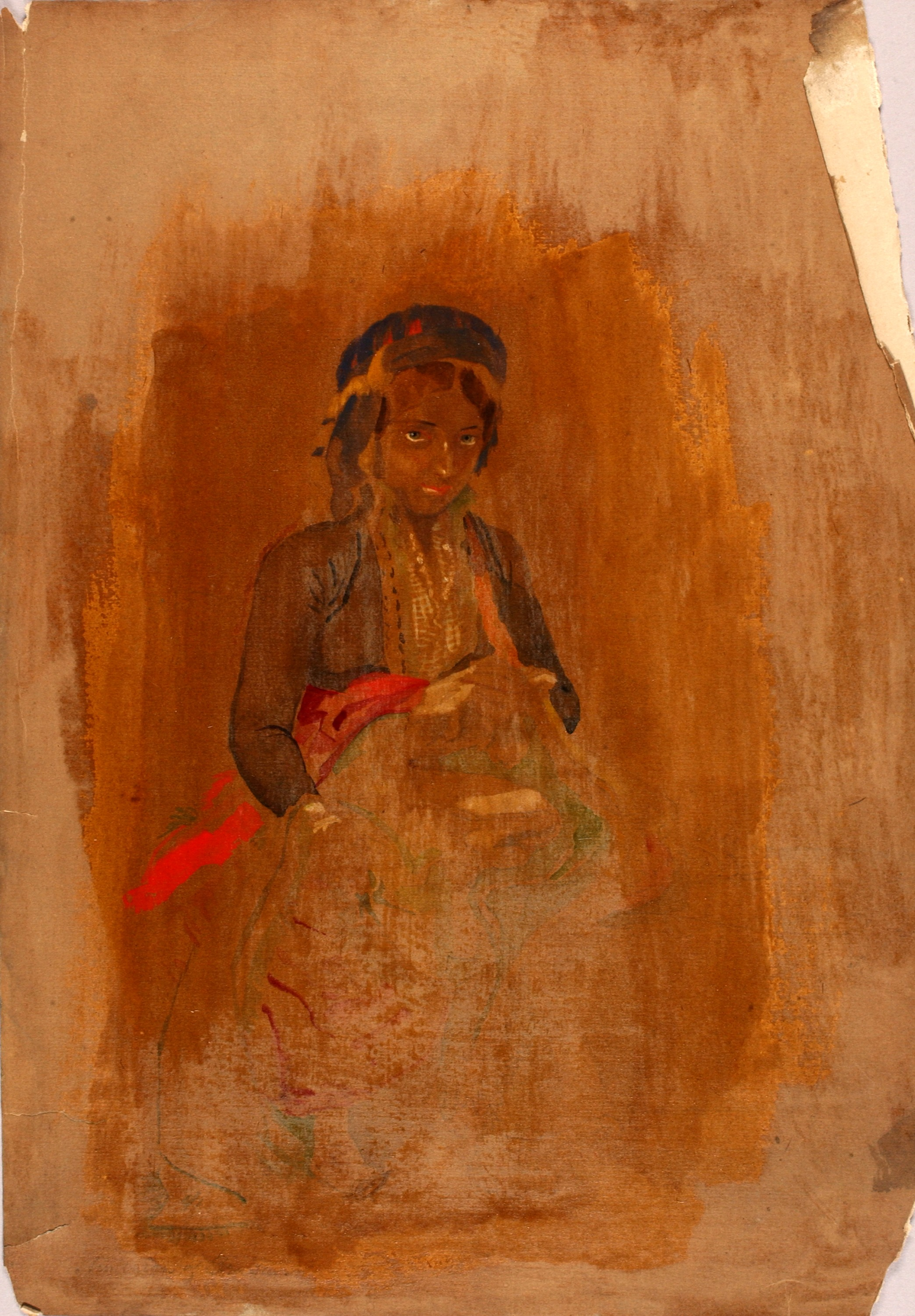
Peasant Woman, Smithsonian American Art Museum

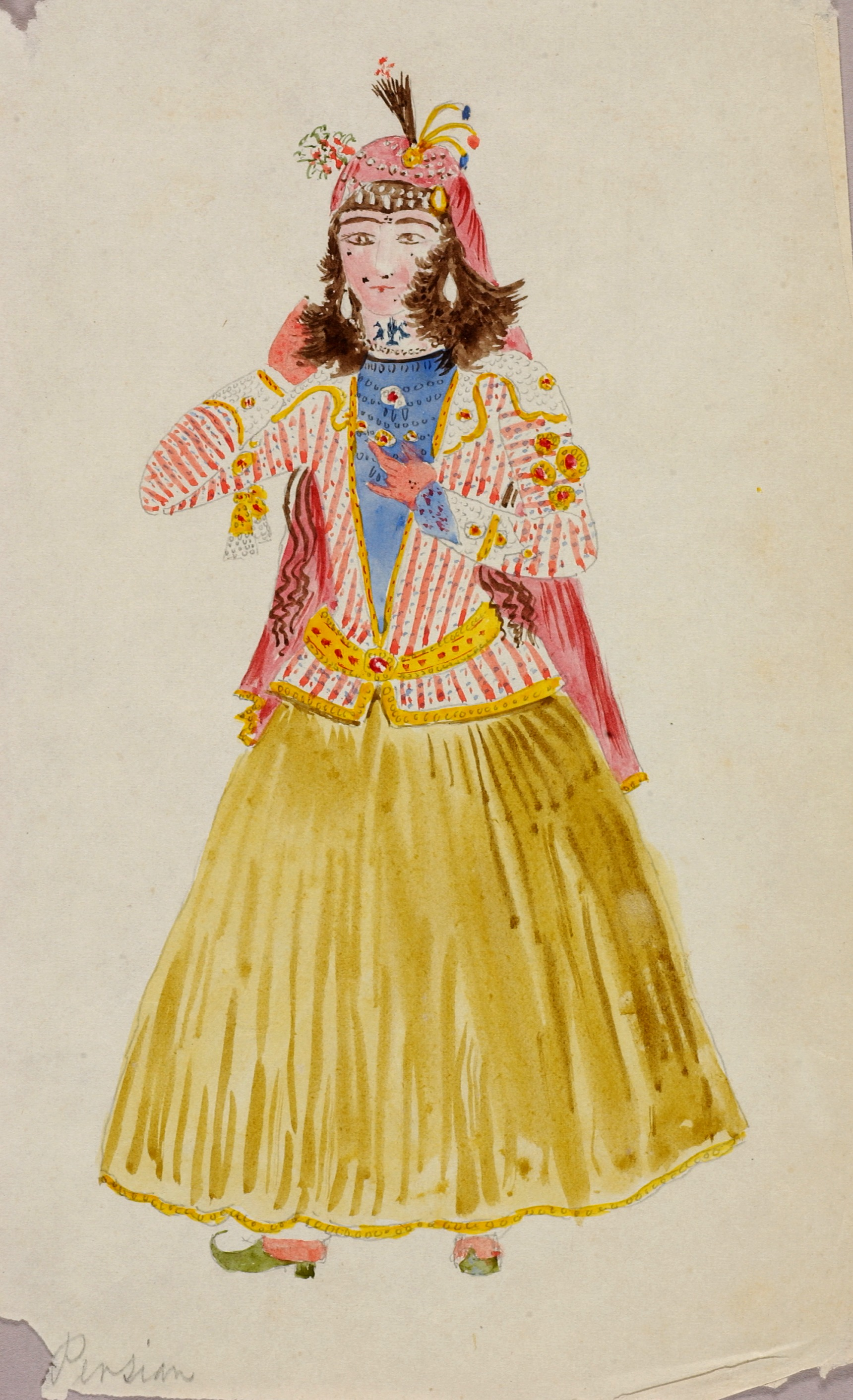
Persian Girl, Smithsonian American Art Museum

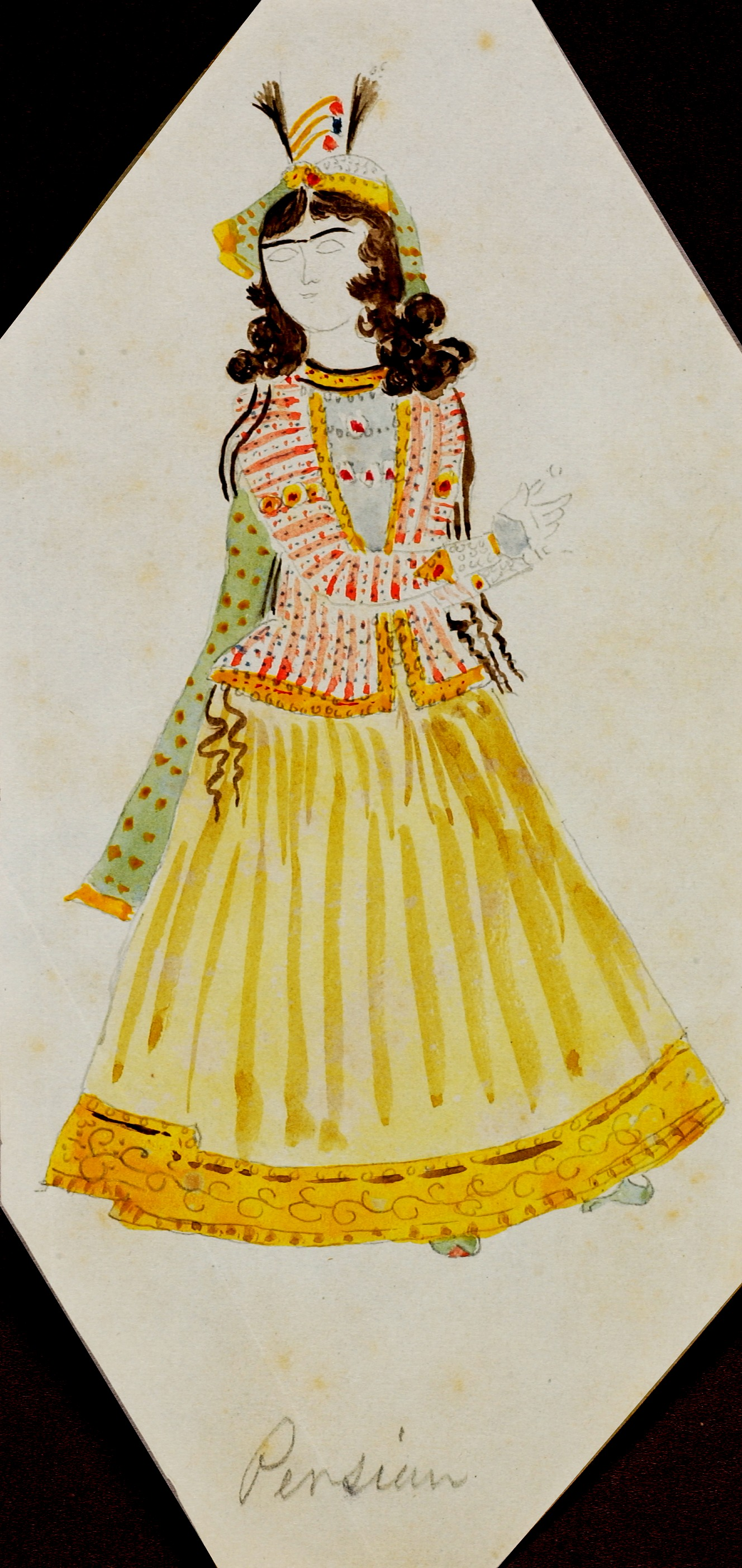
Persian Woman, Smithsonian American Art Museum

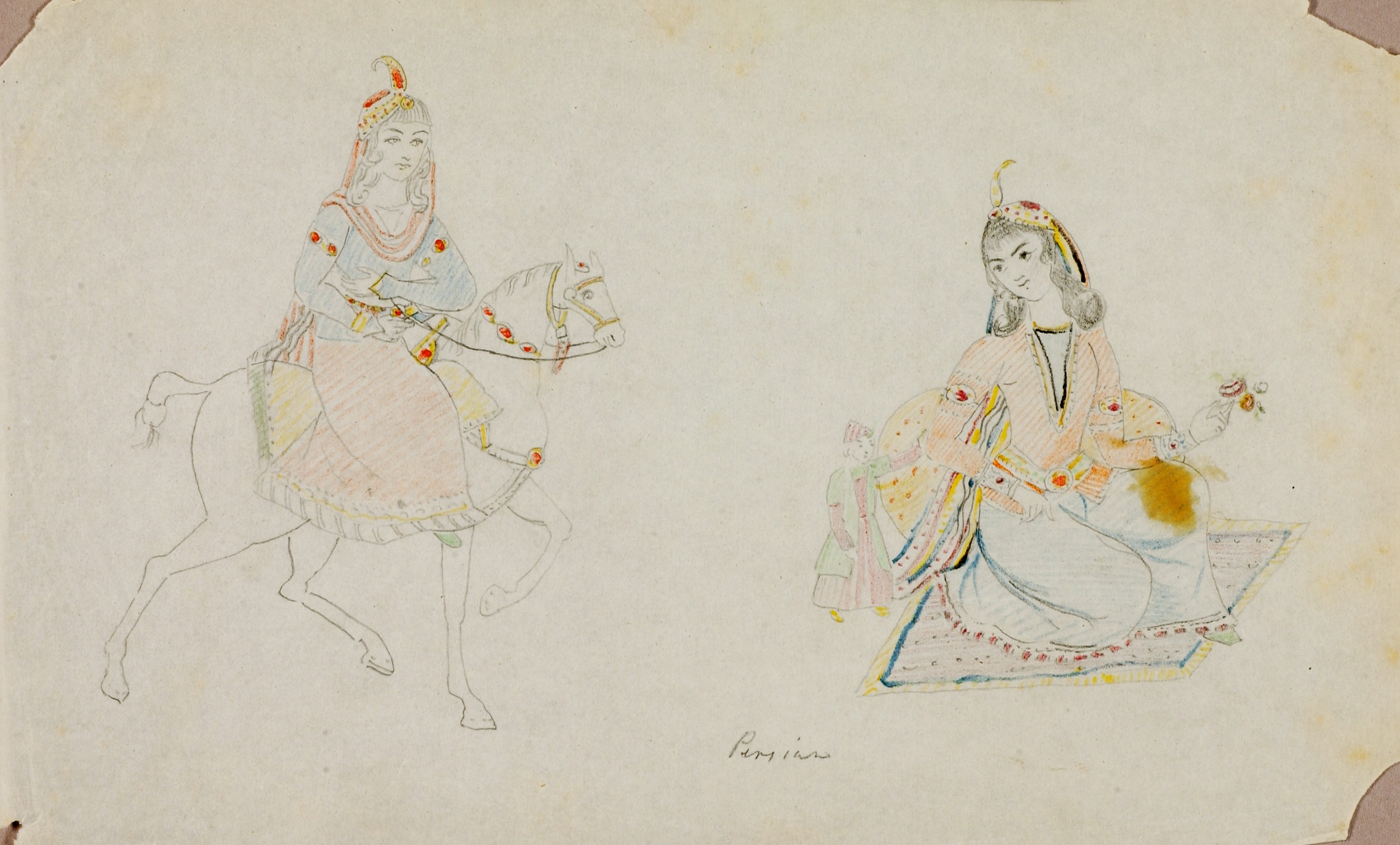
Persian Women, Smithsonian American Art Museum

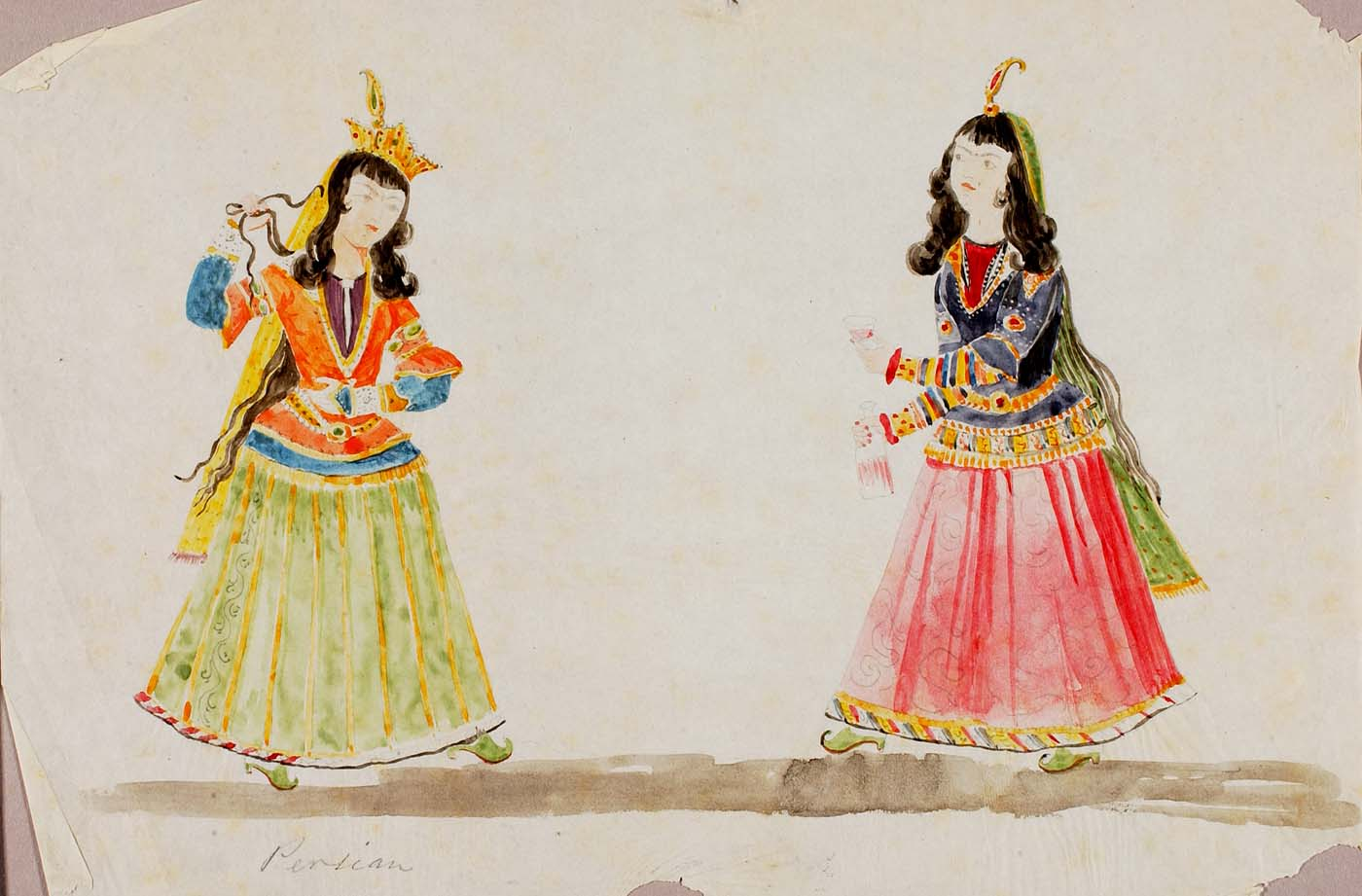
Persian Women, Smithsonian American Art Museum

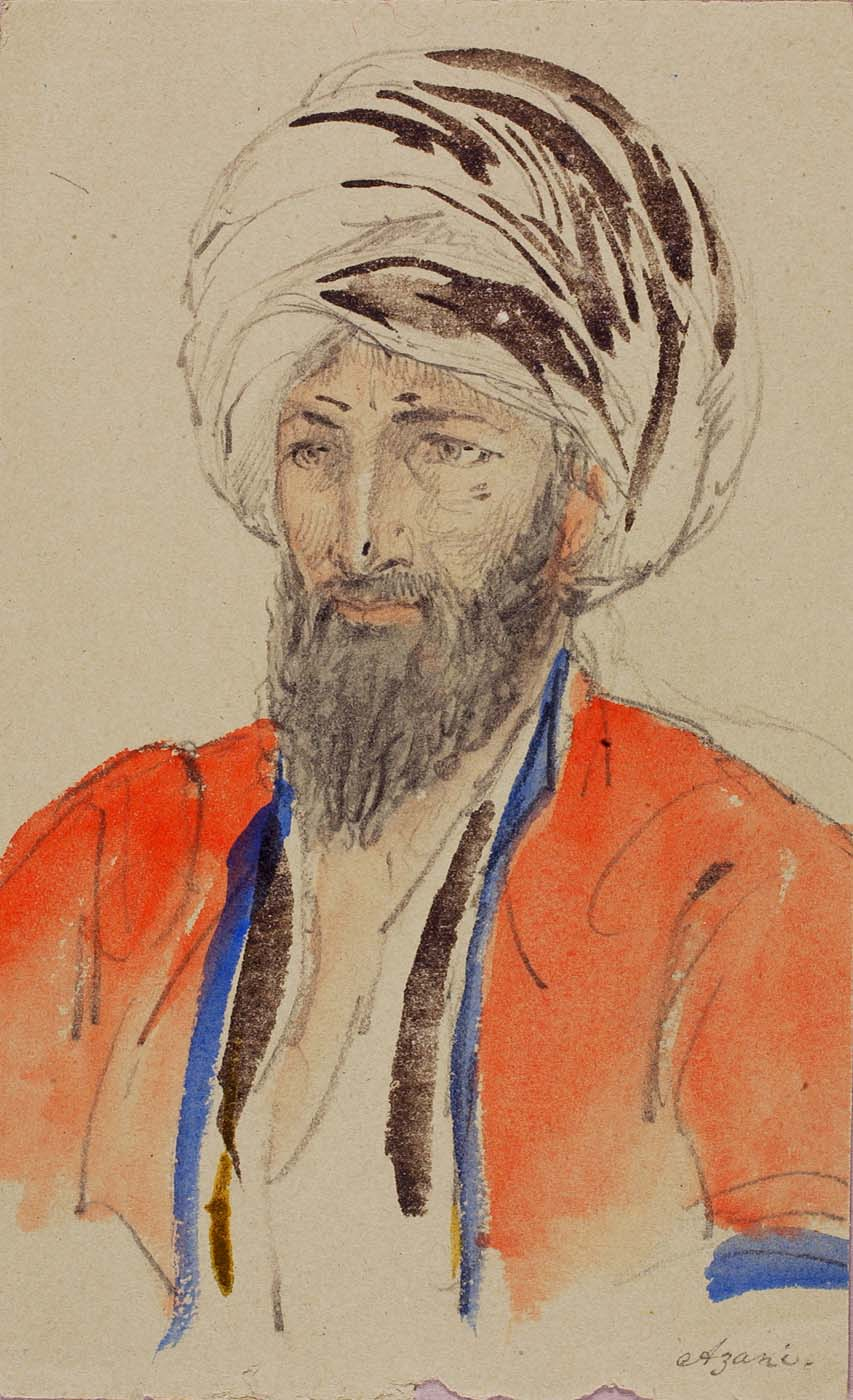
Turk, Azani, Smithsonian American Art Museum

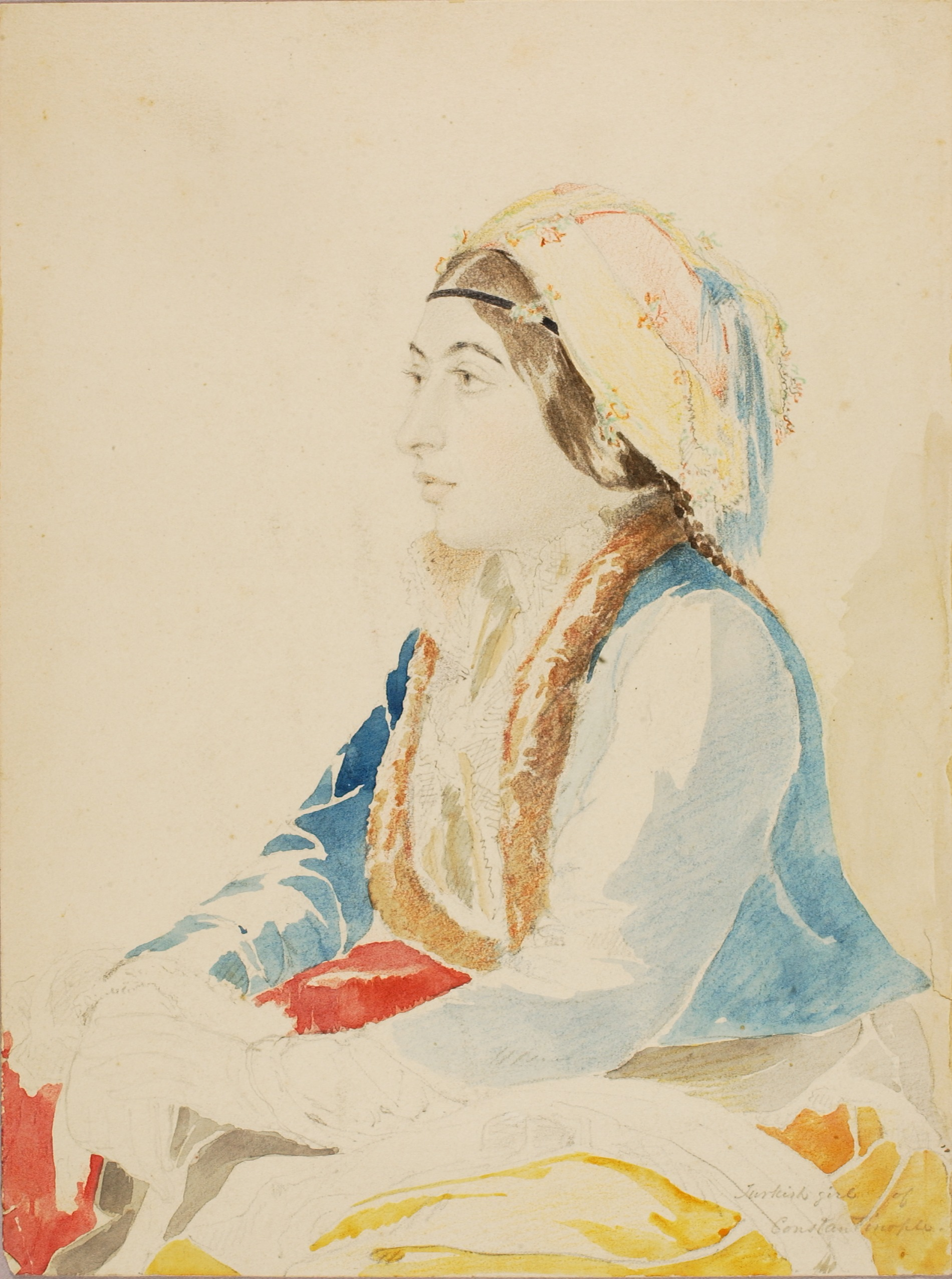
Turkish Girl of Constantinople, Smithsonian American Art Museum

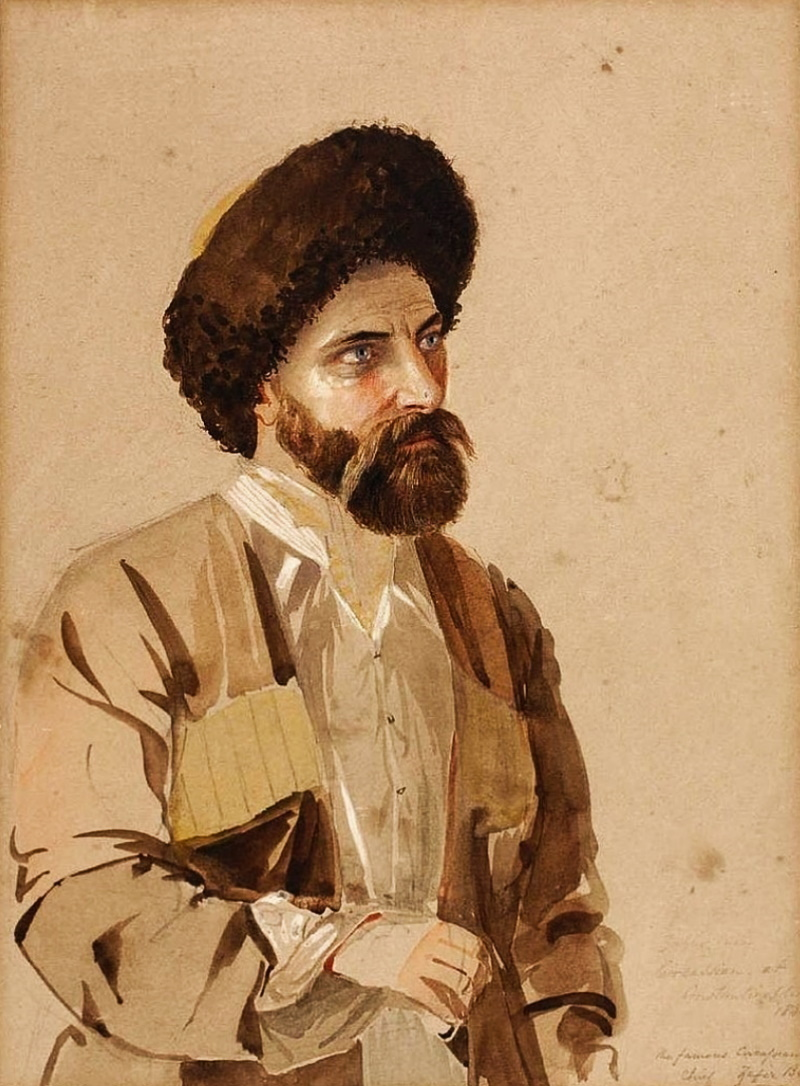
Seferbiy Zaneqo

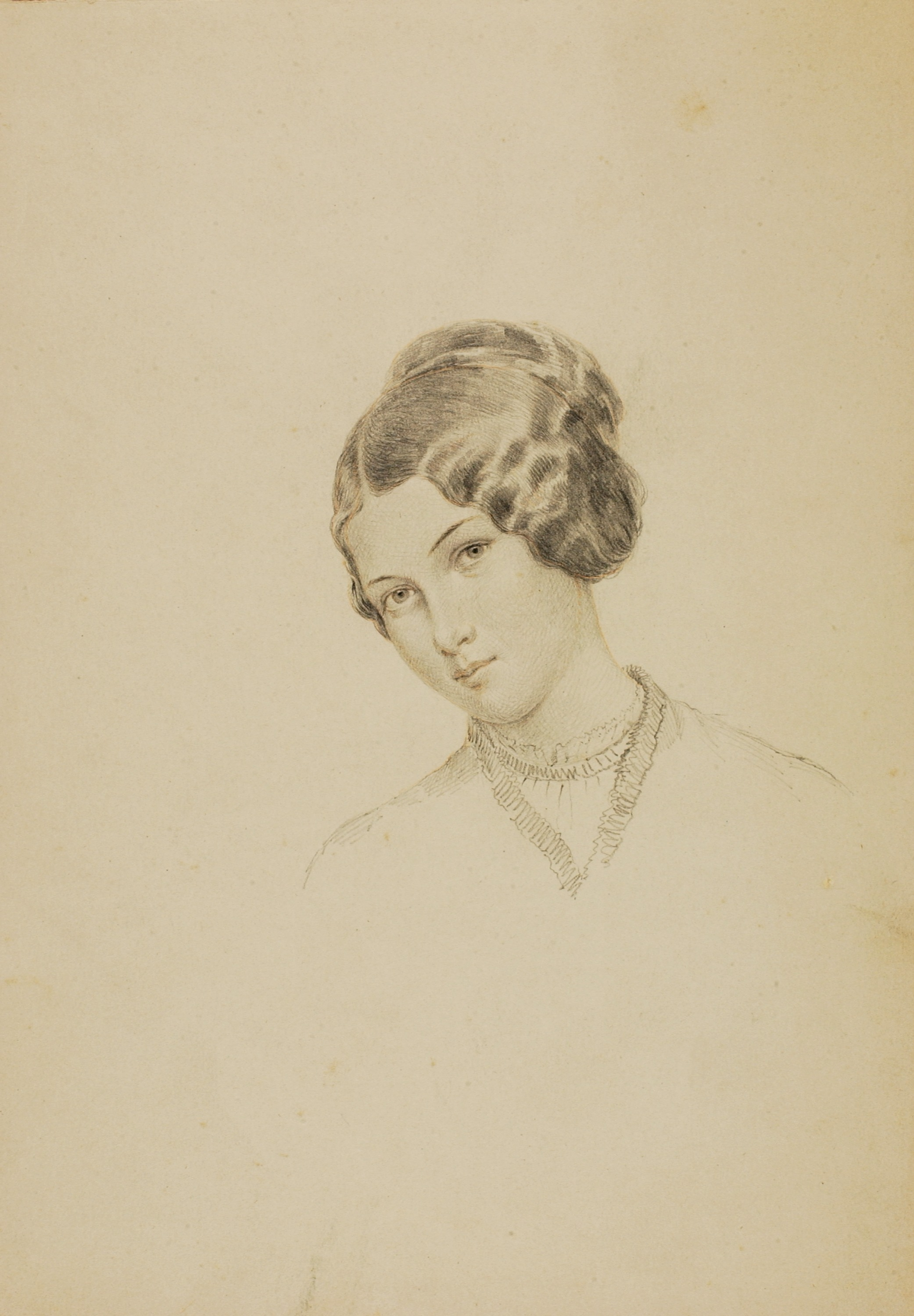
Head of a Lady, Smithsonian American Art Museum

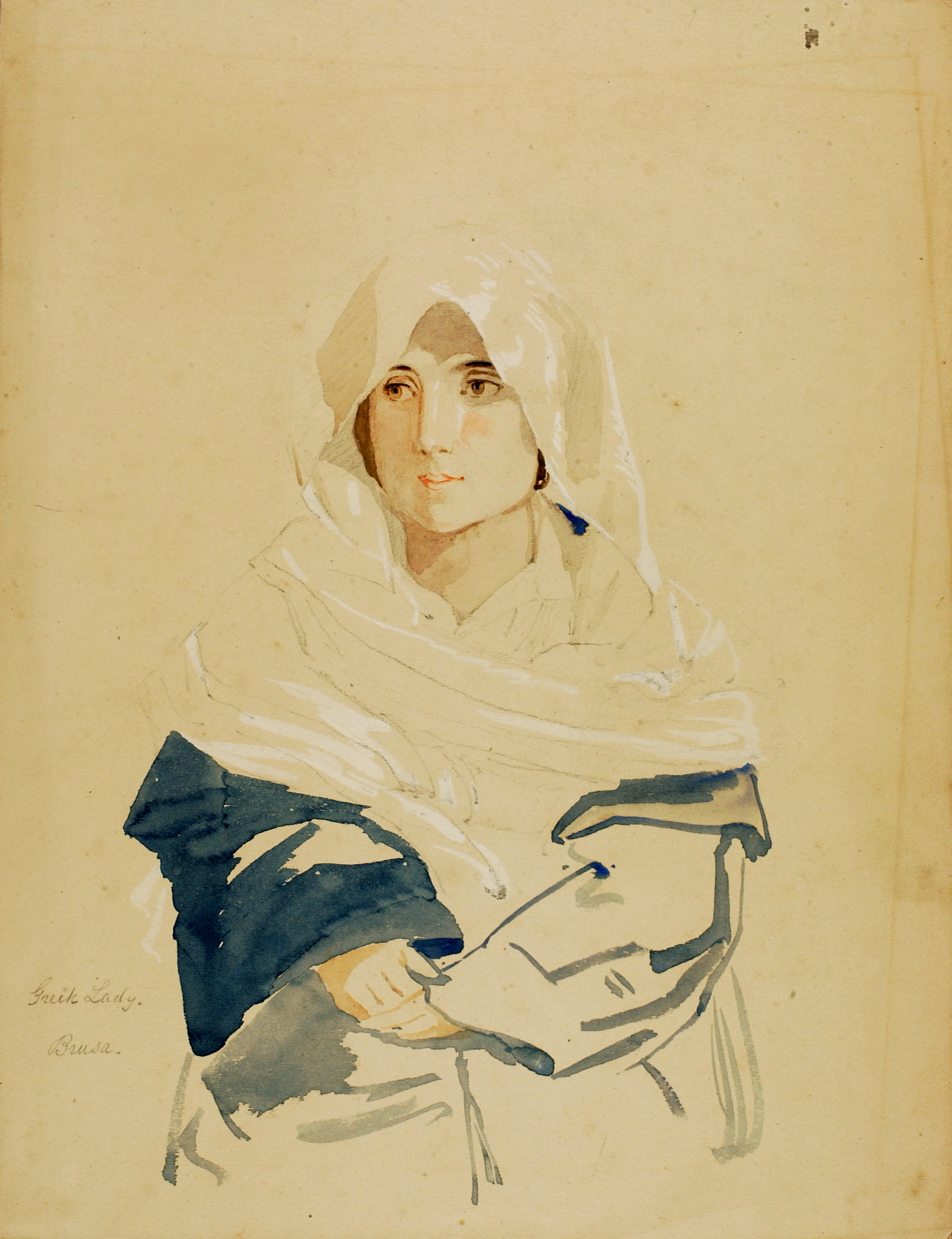
Greek Lady, Brusa, Smithsonian American Art Museum

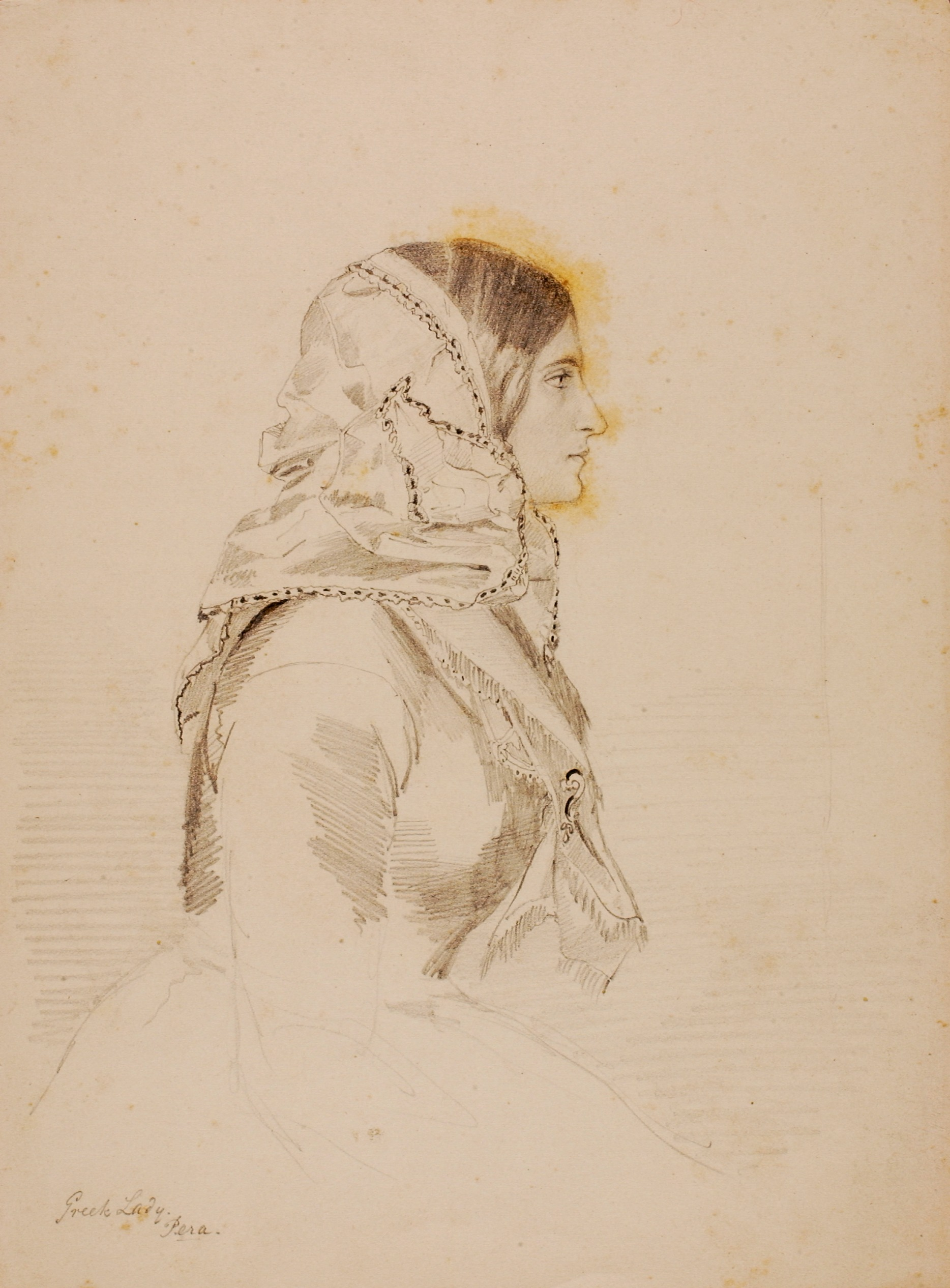
Greek Lady, Pera, Smithsonian American Art Museum

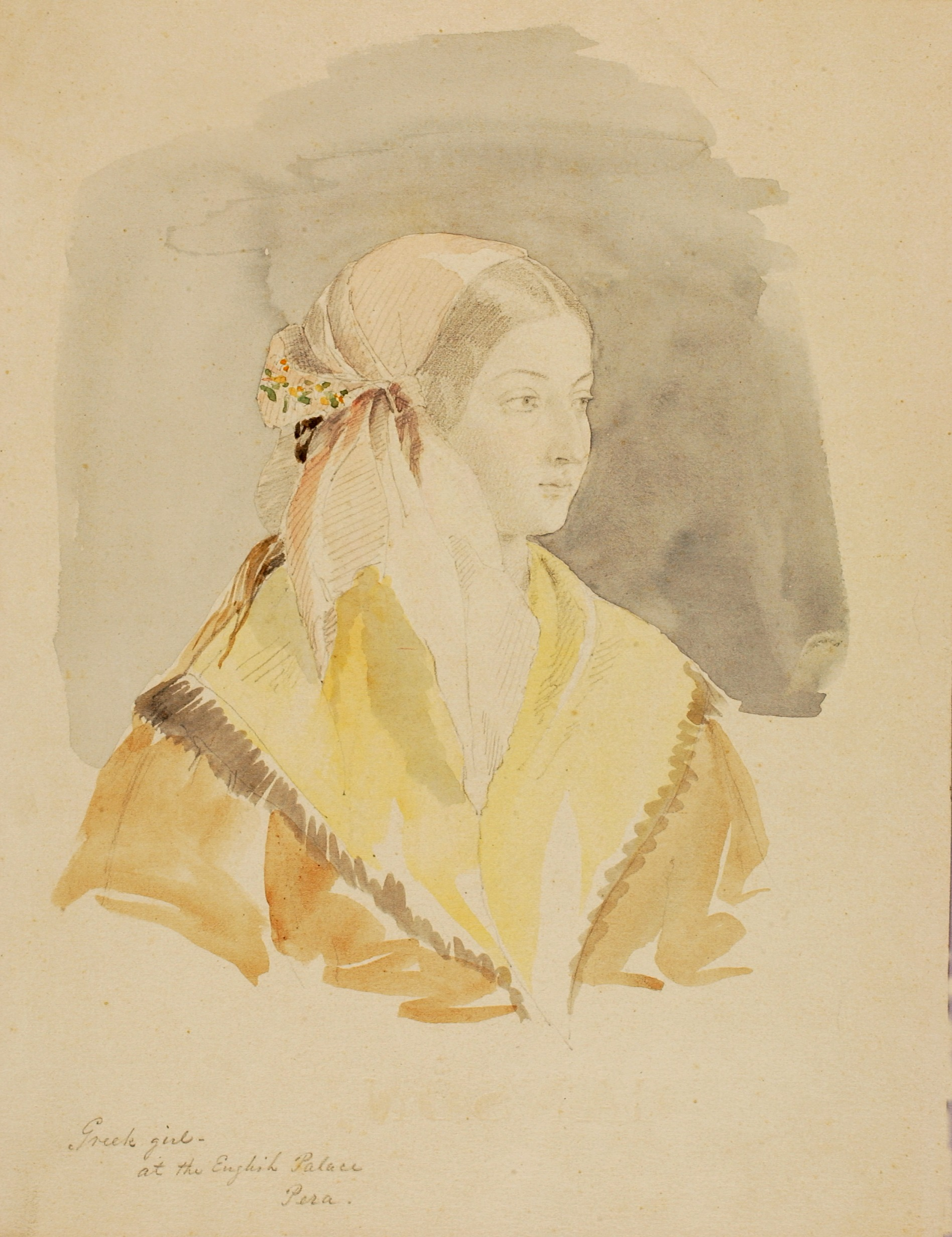
Greek Girl at the English Palace, Pera, Smithsonian American Art Museum

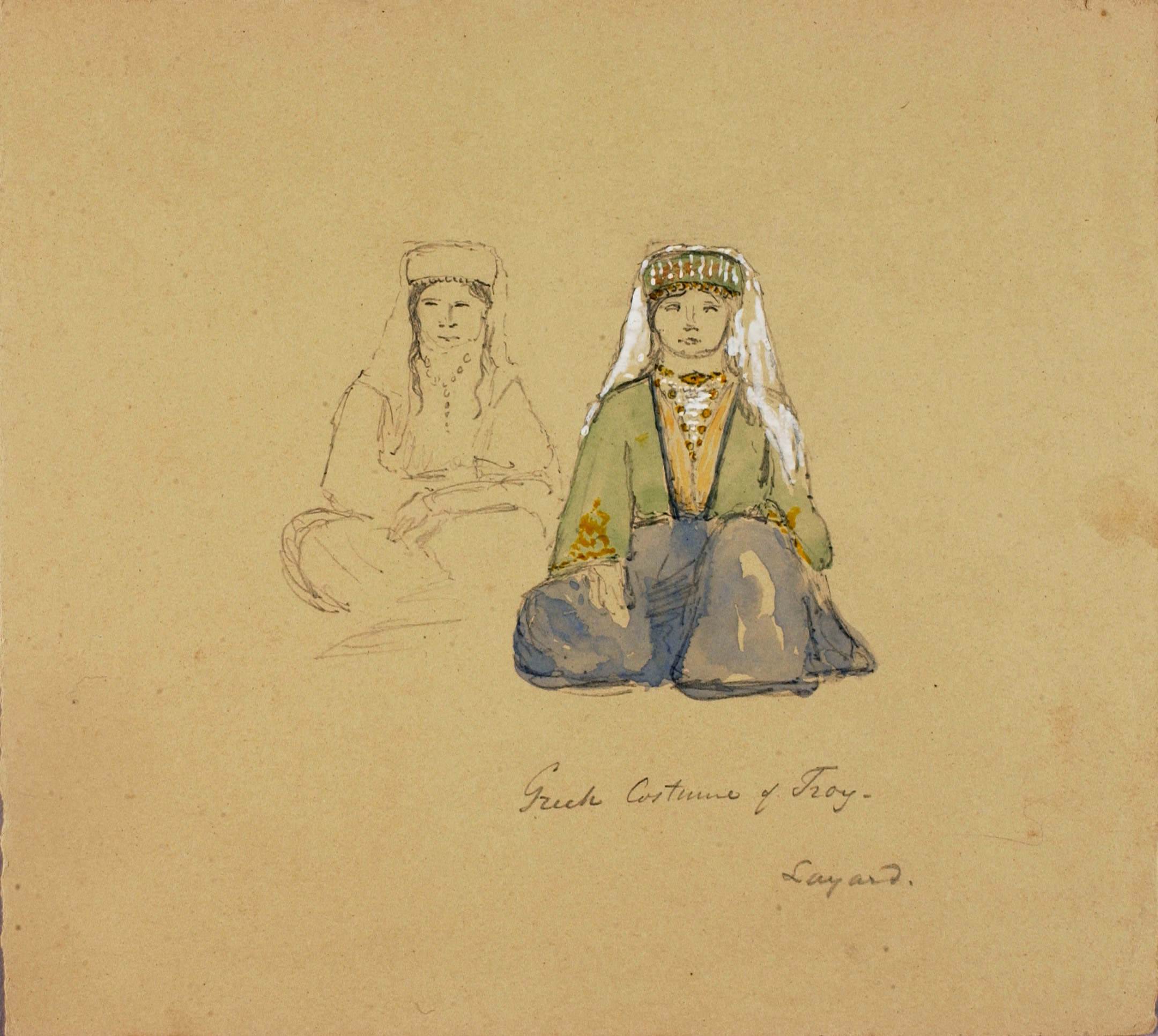
Greek Costume of Troy, Smithsonian American Art Museum

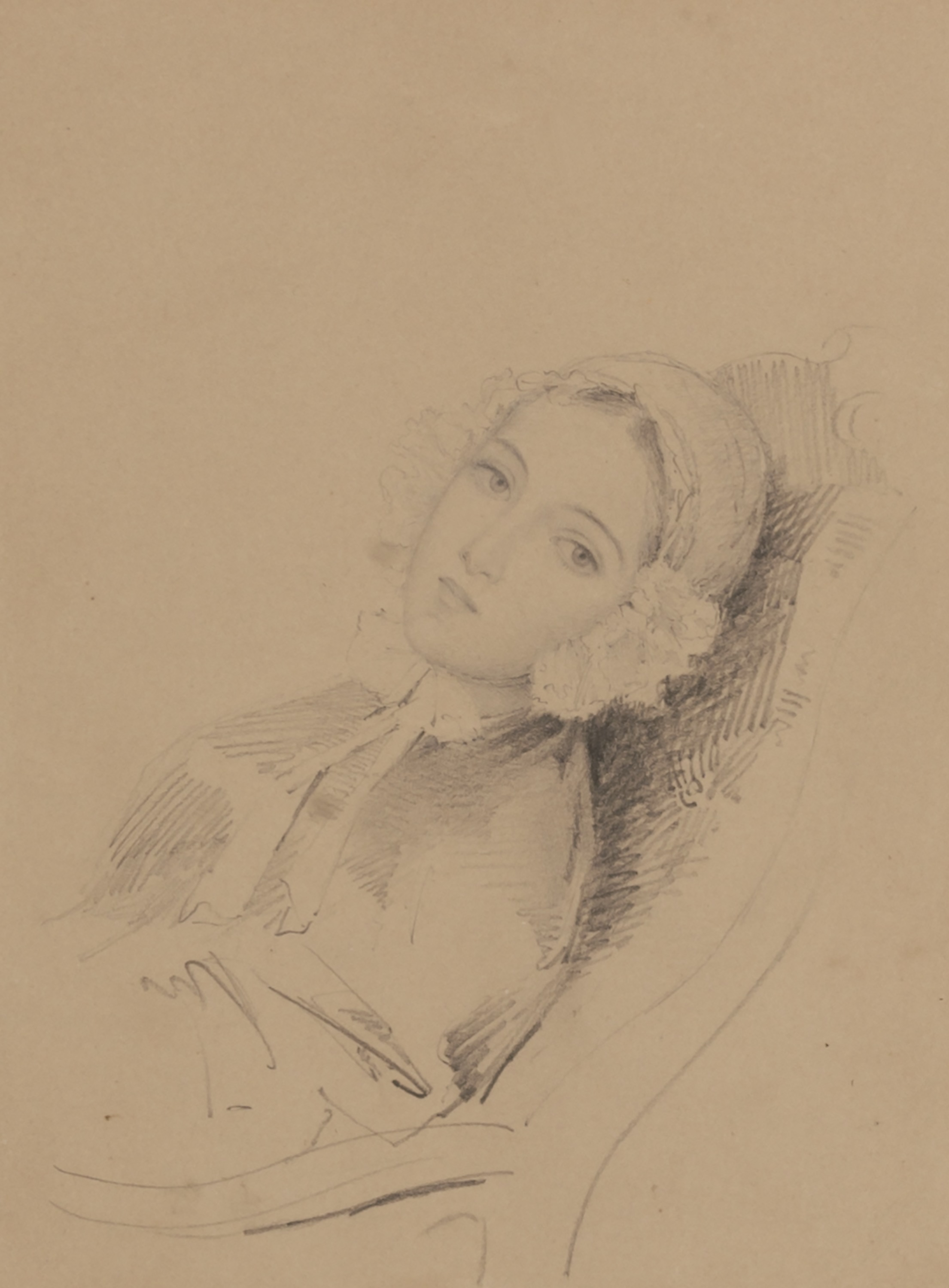
Consumptive Young Lady of New Orleans, Smithsonian American Art Museum

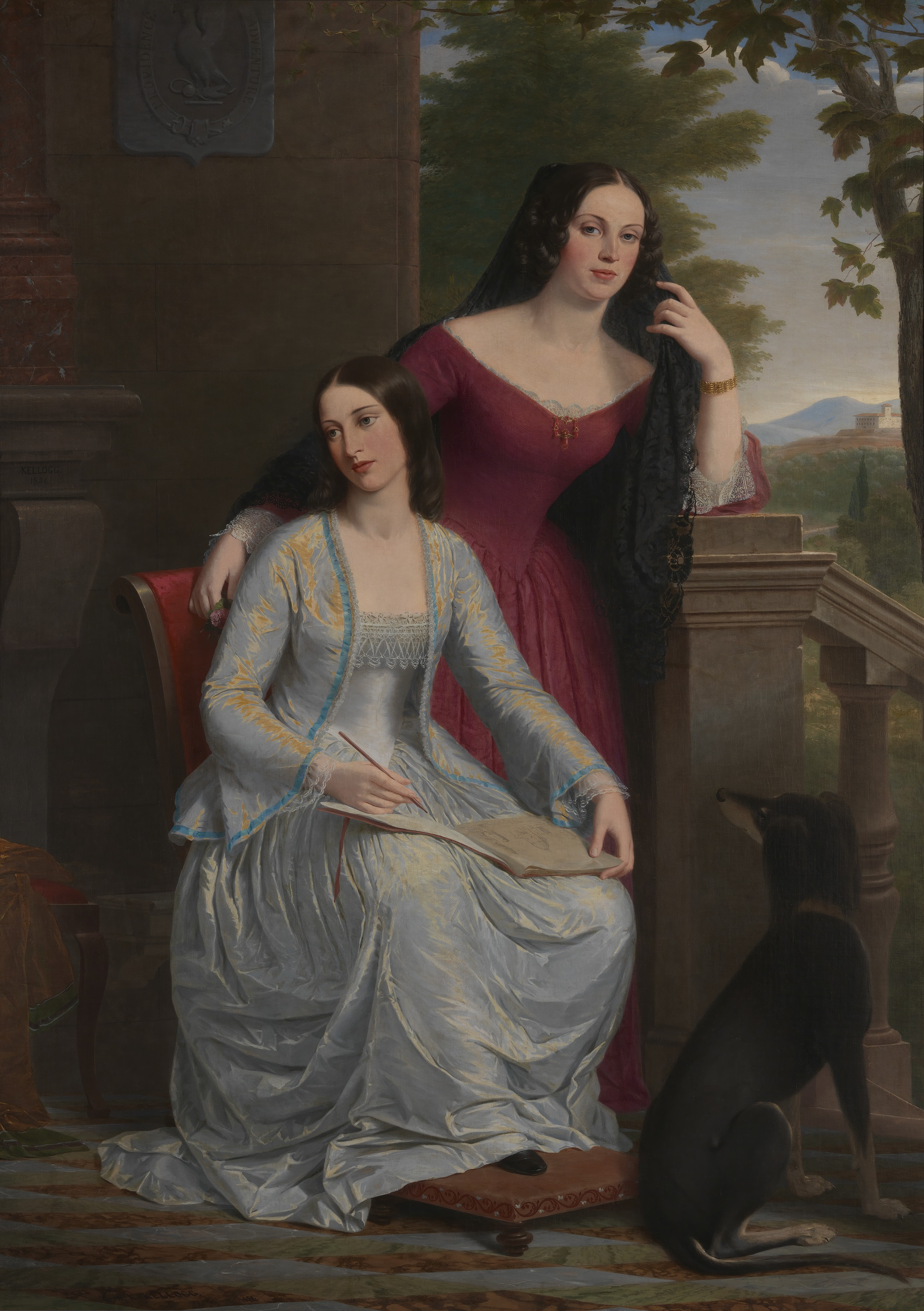
Two Women in an Italian Landscape, 1854 oil painting, Smithsonian American Art Museum

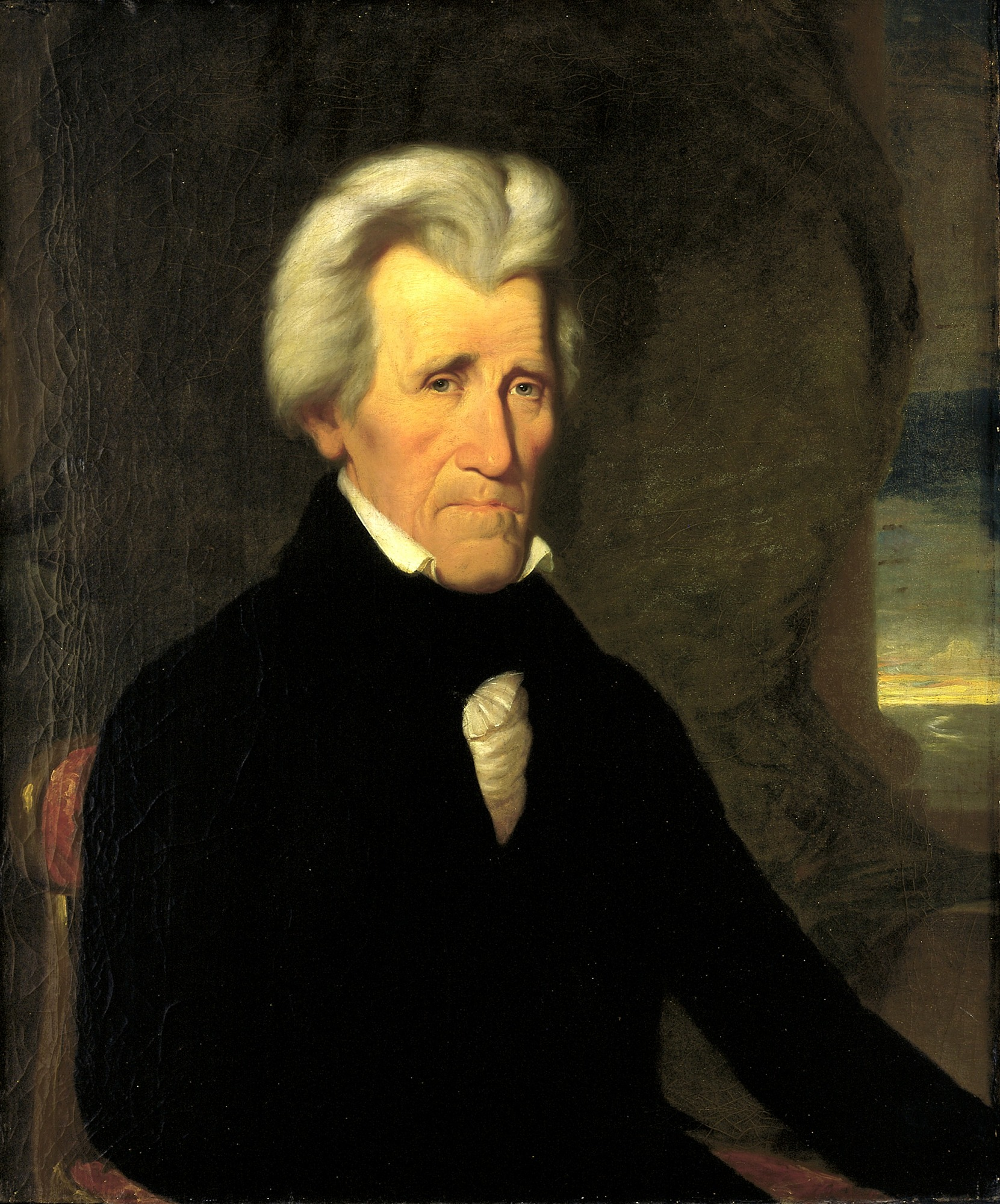
Former President Andrew Jackson, 1840 oil painting, Smithsonian Museum of American Art

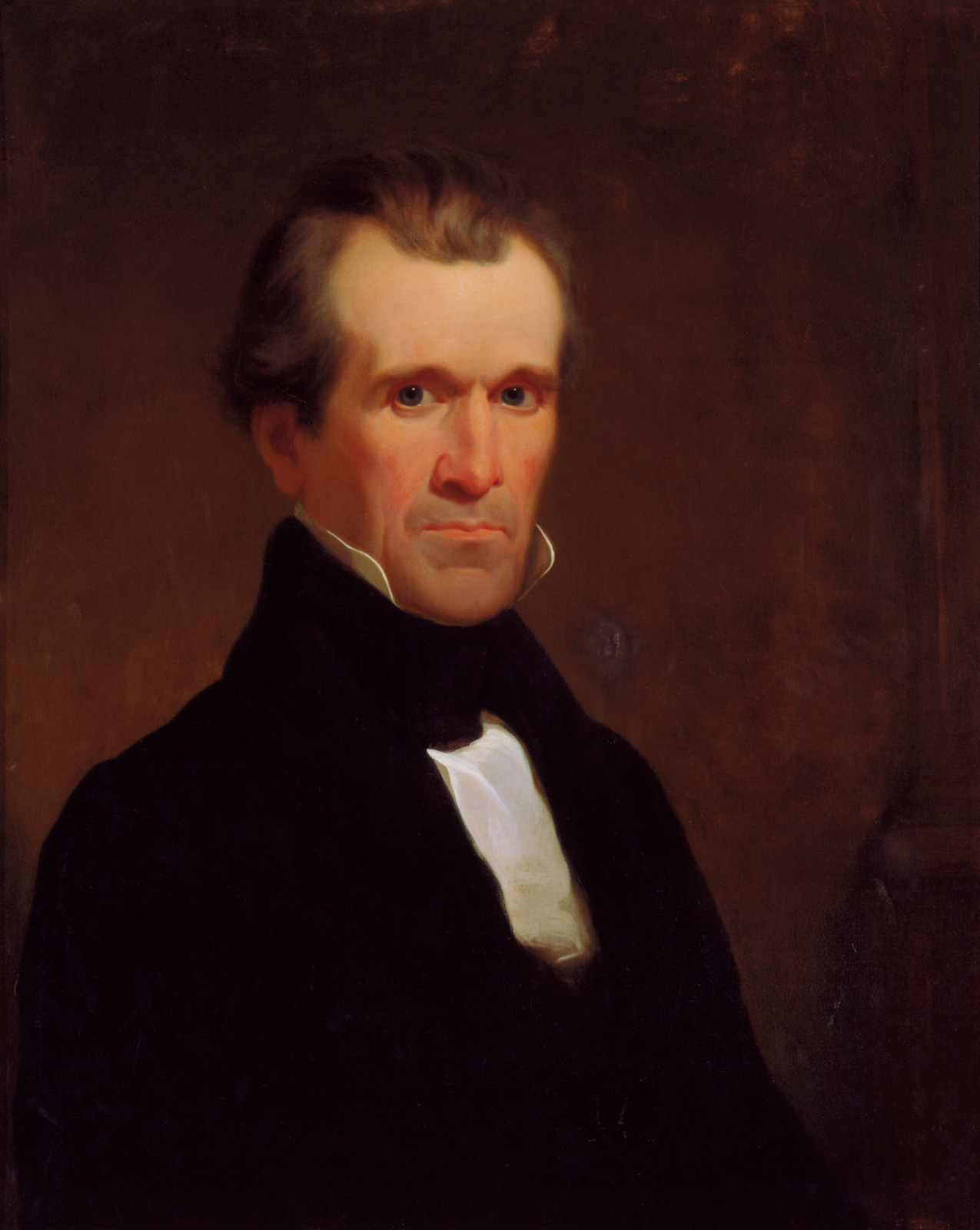
Governor James K. Polk of Tennessee, 1840 oil painting, Cincinnati Museum of Art
