= List of governors of Kansas =

Governor of Kansas
- State seal

- Standard of the governor

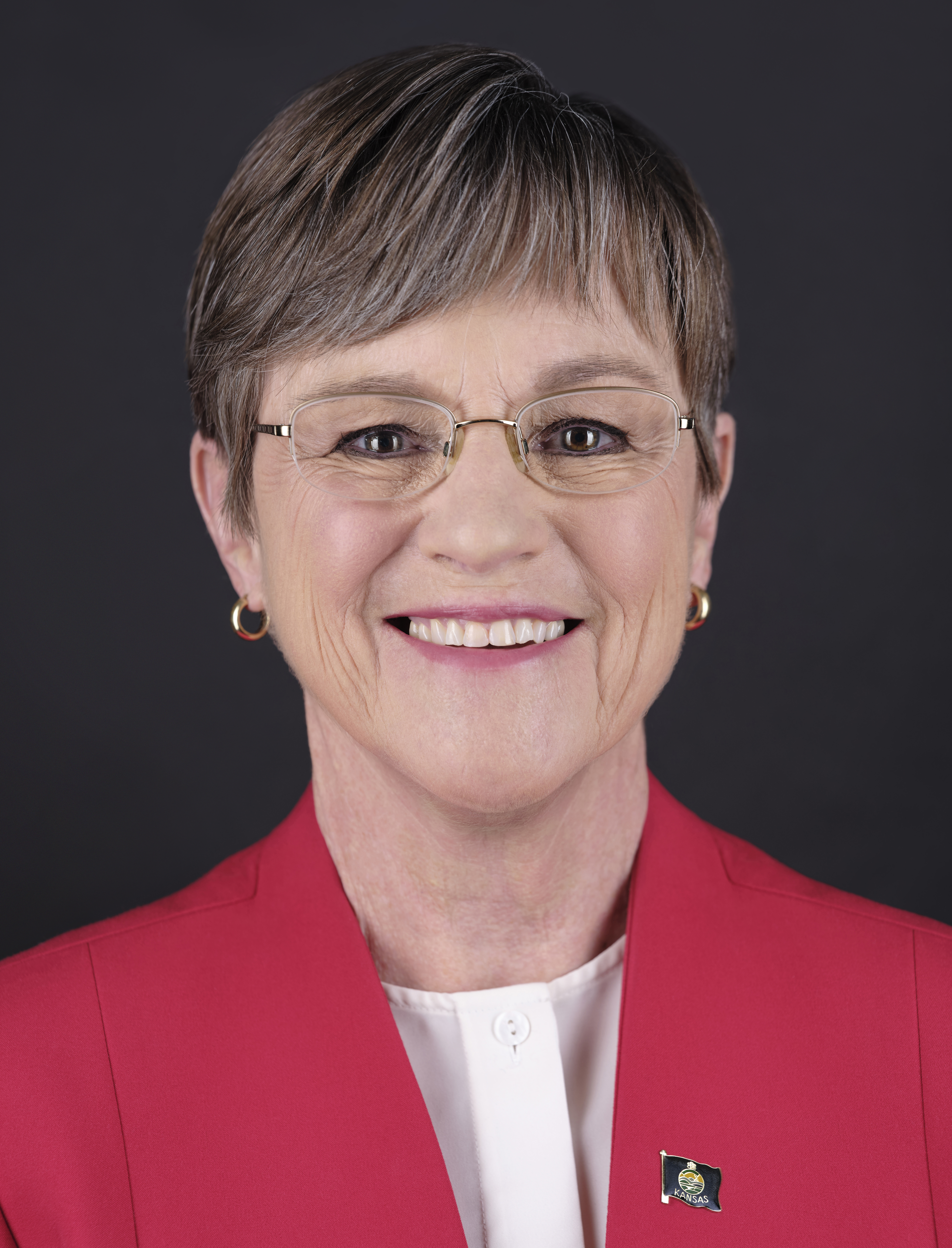
- Incumbent; Laura Kelly since January 14, 2019
- Government of Kansas
- Residence: Cedar Crest
- Term length: Four years, renewable once consecutively
- Inaugural holder: Charles L. Robinson
- Formation: February 9, 1861
- Succession: Line of succession
- Deputy: Lieutenant Governor of Kansas
- Salary: $110,707 (2022)
- Website: governor.kansas.gov

The governor of Kansas is the head of state of Kansas and the commander-in-chief of the state's military forces. The governor has a duty to enforce state laws, and the power to either approve or veto bills passed by the Kansas Legislature, to convene the legislature at any time, and to grant pardons.

Since becoming a state, Kansas has had 48 governors. The state's longest-serving governors were Robert Docking, John W. Carlin, and Bill Graves, each of whom served 8 years (Docking served four two-year terms; Carlin and Graves each served two four-year terms). The shortest-serving governor was John McCuish, who served only 11 days after the resignation of Fred Hall.

The current governor is Democrat Laura Kelly, who took office on January 14, 2019.

== List of governors ==
=== Kansas Territory ===
Kansas Territory was organized on May 30, 1854, from land that had previously been part of Missouri Territory. Despite existing only for six years, it had six governors appointed by the president of the United States.

Governors of the Territory of Kansas
No.	Governor	Term in office (Note: The range given is from the date the governor was confirmed by the Senate, or appointed by the President during a Senate recess, to the date the governor's successor was confirmed, unless noted.)	Appointed by
1	Andrew Horatio Reeder (1807–1864)	June 29, 1854 (Note: Reeder was nominated on June 22, 1854, confirmed by the Senate on June 29, and took office on October 7.) – July 31, 1855 (398 days; removed) (Note: Reeder was dismissed by President Franklin Pierce, "on the tenuous grounds of illegal land speculation" when he refused another appointment.)	Franklin Pierce
2	Wilson Shannon (1802–1877)	August 10, 1855 (Note: Shannon was appointed on August 10, 1855, during a Senate recess; nominated on December 7, 1855, and confirmed by the Senate on February 19, 1856. He took office on September 1, 1855.) – July 31, 1856 (357 days; replaced) (Note: Shannon resigned on August 18, frustrated at how ungovernable he found the territory; however, his replacement had already been confirmed by the Senate.)	Franklin Pierce
3	John W. Geary (1819–1873)	July 31, 1856 (Note: Geary was nominated on July 28, 1856, confirmed by the Senate on July 31, and took office on September 9.) – March 4, 1857 (217 days; resigned) (Note: Geary resigned, "discouraged and feeling betrayed" due to the violence he had experienced.)	Franklin Pierce
4	Robert J. Walker (1801–1869)	March 30, 1857 (Note: Walker was appointed on March 30, 1857, during a Senate recess; he was never confirmed by the Senate. He gave his inaugural address on May 27.) – December 17, 1857 (263 days; resigned) (Note: Walker resigned following constant attack by pro-slavery forces and lack of support from the federal administration.)	James Buchanan
5	James W. Denver (1817–1892)	February 24, 1858 (Note: Denver was nominated on January 12, 1858, and confirmed by the Senate on February 24.) – November 8, 1858 (258 days; resigned) (Note: Denver resigned, tired of the constant strife and lack of support from the federal administration. He submitted his resignation on October 10, 1858, to take effect upon the arrival of his successor, but he left the territory on November 8.)	James Buchanan
6	Samuel Medary (1801–1864)	November 23, 1858 (Note: Medary was appointed on November 23, 1858, during a Senate recess; nominated on December 21; and confirmed by the Senate on December 22. He took office on December 18.) – December 20, 1860 (759 days; resigned) (Note: Medary resigned following the election of Abraham Lincoln to president; he had already lost the election to be the first state governor.)	James Buchanan

=== State of Kansas ===
Flag of the governor prior to 1961. It is unclear when the governor's flag was first created.

The eastern bulk of Kansas Territory was admitted to the Union as Kansas on January 29, 1861. The Kansas Constitution provided that a governor and lieutenant governor be elected every 2 years, for a term commencing on the second Monday in the January after the election. An amendment in 1972 increased terms to four years, with a limit that a governor could not serve more than two terms in a row, and provided that the governor and lieutenant governor are elected on the same ticket. In the original constitution, should the office of governor be vacant, the powers would devolve upon the lieutenant governor, who nonetheless would remain in that office; the 1972 amendment changed it so that, in such an event, the lieutenant governor becomes governor.

Until 2018, there was no age or residency requirement to run for the office; in 2017, three teenagers were doing so. In 2018, a law was passed establishing the age to run for governor and lieutenant governor at 25.

Governors of the State of Kansas
No.	Governor	Term in office	Party	Election	Lt. Governor (Note: Lieutenant governors represented the same party as their governor unless noted.)
1	Charles L. Robinson (1818–1894)	February 9, 1861 – January 12, 1863 (703 days; lost nomination)	Republican	1859	Joseph Pomeroy Root
2	Thomas Carney (1824–1888)	January 12, 1863 – January 9, 1865 (729 days; lost nomination)	Republican	1862	Thomas A. Osborn
3	Samuel J. Crawford (1835–1913)	January 9, 1865 – November 4, 1868 (1396 days; resigned) (Note: Crawford resigned to take command of the 19th Kansas Infantry.)	Republican	1864	James McGrew
3	Samuel J. Crawford (1835–1913)	January 9, 1865 – November 4, 1868 (1396 days; resigned)	Republican	1866	Nehemiah Green
4	Nehemiah Green (1837–1890)	November 4, 1868 – January 11, 1869 (69 days; retired)	Republican	Succeeded from lieutenant governor	Vacant
5	James M. Harvey (1833–1894)	January 11, 1869 – January 13, 1873 (1464 days; retired)	Republican	1868	Charles Vernon Eskridge
5	James M. Harvey (1833–1894)	January 11, 1869 – January 13, 1873 (1464 days; retired)	Republican	1870	Peter Percival Elder
6	Thomas A. Osborn (1836–1898)	January 13, 1873 – January 8, 1877 (1457 days; retired) (Note: Osborn instead ran unsuccessfully for the United States Senate.)	Republican	1872	Elias S. Stover
6	Thomas A. Osborn (1836–1898)	January 13, 1873 – January 8, 1877 (1457 days; retired)	Republican	1874	Melville J. Salter
7	George T. Anthony (1824–1896)	January 8, 1877 – January 13, 1879 (736 days; lost nomination)	Republican	1876	Melville J. Salter
7	George T. Anthony (1824–1896)	January 8, 1877 – January 13, 1879 (736 days; lost nomination)	Republican	1876	Lyman U. Humphrey
8	John St. John (1833–1916)	January 13, 1879 – January 8, 1883 (1457 days; lost election)	Republican	1878	Lyman U. Humphrey
8	John St. John (1833–1916)	January 13, 1879 – January 8, 1883 (1457 days; lost election)	Republican	1880	David Wesley Finney (Note: Represented the Republican Party)
9	George Washington Glick (1827–1911)	January 8, 1883 – January 12, 1885 (736 days; lost election)	Democratic	1882	David Wesley Finney
10	John Martin (1839–1889)	January 12, 1885 – January 14, 1889 (1464 days; retired)	Republican	1884	Alexander P. Riddle
10	John Martin (1839–1889)	January 12, 1885 – January 14, 1889 (1464 days; retired)	Republican	1886	Alexander P. Riddle
11	Lyman U. Humphrey (1844–1915)	January 14, 1889 – January 9, 1893 (1457 days; retired) (Note: Humphrey instead ran unsuccessfully for the United States House of Representatives.)	Republican	1888	Andrew Jackson Felt
11	Lyman U. Humphrey (1844–1915)	January 14, 1889 – January 9, 1893 (1457 days; retired)	Republican	1890	Andrew Jackson Felt
12	Lorenzo D. Lewelling (1846–1900)	January 9, 1893 – January 14, 1895 (736 days; lost election)	Populist	1892	Percy Daniels
13	Edmund Needham Morrill (1834–1909)	January 14, 1895 – January 11, 1897 (729 days; lost election)	Republican	1894	James Armstrong Troutman
14	John W. Leedy (1849–1935)	January 11, 1897 – January 9, 1899 (729 days; lost election)	Populist	1896	Alexander Miller Harvey
15	William Eugene Stanley (1844–1910)	January 9, 1899 – January 12, 1903 (1464 days; retired) (Note: Stanley instead ran unsuccessfully for the United States Senate.)	Republican	1898	Harry E. Richter
15	William Eugene Stanley (1844–1910)	January 9, 1899 – January 12, 1903 (1464 days; retired)	Republican	1900	Harry E. Richter
16	Willis J. Bailey (1854–1932)	January 12, 1903 – January 9, 1905 (729 days; lost nomination)	Republican	1902	David John Hanna
17	Edward W. Hoch (1849–1925)	January 9, 1905 – January 11, 1909 (1464 days; retired)	Republican	1904	David John Hanna
17	Edward W. Hoch (1849–1925)	January 9, 1905 – January 11, 1909 (1464 days; retired)	Republican	1906	William James Fitzgerald
18	Walter R. Stubbs (1858–1929)	January 11, 1909 – January 13, 1913 (1464 days; retired) (Note: Stubbs instead ran unsuccessfully for the United States Senate.)	Republican	1908	William James Fitzgerald
18	Walter R. Stubbs (1858–1929)	January 11, 1909 – January 13, 1913 (1464 days; retired)	Republican	1910	Richard Joseph Hopkins
19	George H. Hodges (1866–1947)	January 13, 1913 – January 11, 1915 (729 days; lost election)	Democratic	1912	Sheffield Ingalls
20	Arthur Capper (1865–1951)	January 11, 1915 – January 13, 1919 (1464 days; retired) (Note: Capper was instead elected to the United States Senate.)	Republican	1914	William Yoast Morgan
20	Arthur Capper (1865–1951)	January 11, 1915 – January 13, 1919 (1464 days; retired)	Republican	1916	William Yoast Morgan
21	Henry J. Allen (1868–1950)	January 13, 1919 – January 8, 1923 (1457 days; retired)	Republican	1918	Charles Solomon Huffman
21	Henry J. Allen (1868–1950)	January 13, 1919 – January 8, 1923 (1457 days; retired)	Republican	1920	Charles Solomon Huffman
22	Jonathan M. Davis (1871–1943)	January 8, 1923 – January 12, 1925 (736 days; lost election)	Democratic	1922	Benjamin S. Paulen
23	Benjamin S. Paulen (1869–1961)	January 12, 1925 – January 14, 1929 (1464 days; retired)	Republican	1924	De Lanson Alson Newton Chase
23	Benjamin S. Paulen (1869–1961)	January 12, 1925 – January 14, 1929 (1464 days; retired)	Republican	1926	De Lanson Alson Newton Chase
24	Clyde M. Reed (1871–1949)	January 14, 1929 – January 12, 1931 (729 days; lost nomination) (Note: Reed lost the Republican nomination to Frank Haucke.)	Republican	1928	Jacob W. Graybill
25	Harry Hines Woodring (1887–1967)	January 12, 1931 – January 9, 1933 (729 days; lost election)	Democratic	1930	Jacob W. Graybill
26	Alf Landon (1887–1987)	January 9, 1933 – January 11, 1937 (1464 days; retired) (Note: Landon instead ran unsuccessfully for President of the United States.)	Republican	1932	Charles W. Thompson
26	Alf Landon (1887–1987)	January 9, 1933 – January 11, 1937 (1464 days; retired)	Republican	1934	Charles W. Thompson
27	Walter A. Huxman (1887–1972)	January 11, 1937 – January 9, 1939 (729 days; lost election)	Democratic	1936	William M. Lindsay
28	Payne Ratner (1896–1974)	January 9, 1939 – January 11, 1943 (1464 days; retired)	Republican	1938	Carl E. Friend
28	Payne Ratner (1896–1974)	January 9, 1939 – January 11, 1943 (1464 days; retired)	Republican	1940	Carl E. Friend
29	Andrew Frank Schoeppel (1894–1962)	January 11, 1943 – January 13, 1947 (1464 days; retired)	Republican	1942	Jess C. Denious
29	Andrew Frank Schoeppel (1894–1962)	January 11, 1943 – January 13, 1947 (1464 days; retired)	Republican	1944	Jess C. Denious
30	Frank Carlson (1893–1987)	January 13, 1947 – November 28, 1950 (1416 days; resigned) (Note: Carlson resigned; he had been elected to the United States Senate to replace Harry Darby, and Darby resigned early so that Carlson could be appointed to the seat early by his replacement as governor, Frank L. Hagaman.)	Republican	1946	Frank L. Hagaman
30	Frank Carlson (1893–1987)	January 13, 1947 – November 28, 1950 (1416 days; resigned)	Republican	1948	Frank L. Hagaman
31	Frank L. Hagaman (1894–1966)	November 28, 1950 – January 8, 1951 (42 days; lost nomination) (Note: Hagaman had already lost the Republican nomination to Edward F. Arn when he succeeded Carlson.)	Republican	Succeeded from lieutenant governor	Vacant
32	Edward F. Arn (1906–1998)	January 8, 1951 – January 10, 1955 (1464 days; retired)	Republican	1950	Fred Hall
32	Edward F. Arn (1906–1998)	January 8, 1951 – January 10, 1955 (1464 days; retired)	Republican	1952	Fred Hall
33	Fred Hall (1916–1970)	January 10, 1955 – January 3, 1957 (725 days; resigned) (Note: Hall resigned so that his successor would appoint him to the Kansas Supreme Court; he had already lost the Republican nomination to Warren W. Shaw.)	Republican	1954	John McCuish
34	John McCuish (1906–1962)	January 3, 1957 – January 14, 1957 (12 days; retired) (Note: McCuish had already lost the election for lieutenant governor when he succeeded Hall.)	Republican	Succeeded from lieutenant governor	Vacant
35	George Docking (1904–1964)	January 14, 1957 – January 9, 1961 (1457 days; lost election)	Democratic	1956	Joseph W. Henkle Sr.
35	George Docking (1904–1964)	January 14, 1957 – January 9, 1961 (1457 days; lost election)	Democratic	1958	Joseph W. Henkle Sr.
36	John Anderson Jr. (1917–2014)	January 9, 1961 – January 11, 1965 (1464 days; retired)	Republican	1960	Harold H. Chase
36	John Anderson Jr. (1917–2014)	January 9, 1961 – January 11, 1965 (1464 days; retired)	Republican	1962	Harold H. Chase
37	William H. Avery (1911–2009)	January 11, 1965 – January 9, 1967 (729 days; lost election)	Republican	1964	John Crutcher
38	Robert Docking (1925–1983)	January 9, 1967 – January 13, 1975 (2927 days; term-limited) (Note: Under a 1972 amendment to the constitution, governors may not be elected to more than two successive terms.)	Democratic	1966	John Crutcher
38	Robert Docking (1925–1983)	January 9, 1967 – January 13, 1975 (2927 days; term-limited)	Democratic	1968	James H. DeCoursey Jr.
38	Robert Docking (1925–1983)	January 9, 1967 – January 13, 1975 (2927 days; term-limited)	Democratic	1970	Reynolds Shultz
38	Robert Docking (1925–1983)	January 9, 1967 – January 13, 1975 (2927 days; term-limited)	Democratic	1972	Dave Owen
39	Robert Frederick Bennett (1927–2000)	January 13, 1975 – January 8, 1979 (1457 days; lost election)	Republican	1974 (Note: First term under a 1972 constitutional amendment which lengthened terms to four years.)	Shelby Smith
40	John W. Carlin (b. 1940)	January 8, 1979 – January 12, 1987 (2927 days; term-limited)	Democratic	1978	Paul Dugan
40	John W. Carlin (b. 1940)	January 8, 1979 – January 12, 1987 (2927 days; term-limited)	Democratic	1982	Thomas Docking
41	Mike Hayden (b. 1944)	January 12, 1987 – January 14, 1991 (1464 days; lost election)	Republican	1986	Jack D. Walker
42	Joan Finney (1925–2001)	January 14, 1991 – January 9, 1995 (1457 days; retired)	Democratic	1990	Jim Francisco
43	Bill Graves (b. 1953)	January 9, 1995 – January 13, 2003 (2927 days; term-limited)	Republican	1994	Sheila Frahm (resigned June 11, 1996)
43	Bill Graves (b. 1953)	January 9, 1995 – January 13, 2003 (2927 days; term-limited)	Republican	1994	Vacant
43	Bill Graves (b. 1953)	January 9, 1995 – January 13, 2003 (2927 days; term-limited)	Republican	1994	Gary Sherrer (appointed July 18, 1996)
43	Bill Graves (b. 1953)	January 9, 1995 – January 13, 2003 (2927 days; term-limited)	Republican	1998	Gary Sherrer (appointed July 18, 1996)
44	Kathleen Sebelius (b. 1948)	January 13, 2003 – April 28, 2009 (2298 days; resigned) (Note: Sebelius resigned, having been confirmed as United States Secretary of Health and Human Services.)	Democratic	2002	John E. Moore
44	Kathleen Sebelius (b. 1948)	January 13, 2003 – April 28, 2009 (2298 days; resigned)	Democratic	2006	Mark Parkinson
45	Mark Parkinson (b. 1957)	April 28, 2009 – January 10, 2011 (623 days; retired)	Democratic	Succeeded from lieutenant governor	Vacant
45	Mark Parkinson (b. 1957)	April 28, 2009 – January 10, 2011 (623 days; retired)	Democratic	Succeeded from lieutenant governor	Troy Findley (appointed May 15, 2009)
46	Sam Brownback (b. 1956)	January 10, 2011 – January 31, 2018 (2579 days; resigned) (Note: Brownback resigned, having been confirmed as United States Ambassador-at-Large for International Religious Freedom.)	Republican	2010	Jeff Colyer
46	Sam Brownback (b. 1956)	January 10, 2011 – January 31, 2018 (2579 days; resigned)	Republican	2014	Jeff Colyer
47	Jeff Colyer (b. 1960)	January 31, 2018 – January 14, 2019 (349 days; lost nomination) (Note: Colyer lost the Republican nomination to Kris Kobach.)	Republican	Succeeded from lieutenant governor	Vacant
47	Jeff Colyer (b. 1960)	January 31, 2018 – January 14, 2019 (349 days; lost nomination)	Republican	Succeeded from lieutenant governor	Tracey Mann (appointed February 14, 2018)
48	Laura Kelly (b. 1950)	January 14, 2019 – Incumbent (Note: Kelly's second term began on January 9, 2023, and will expire on January 11, 2027; she will be term-limited.) (in office 2870 days)	Democratic	2018	Lynn Rogers (resigned January 2, 2021)
48	Laura Kelly (b. 1950)	January 14, 2019 – Incumbent (in office 2870 days)	Democratic	2018	David Toland (appointed January 2, 2021)
48	Laura Kelly (b. 1950)	January 14, 2019 – Incumbent (in office 2870 days)	Democratic	2022	David Toland (appointed January 2, 2021)
49	Cindy Holscher (b. 1969)	Governor-elect takes office January 11, 2027	Democratic	2026	KC Ohaebosim

== Timeline ==
Timeline of Kansas governors

== See also ==
- Gubernatorial lines of succession in the United States § Kansas
- First ladies and gentlemen of Kansas
- Lieutenant Governor of Kansas
- List of Kansas state legislatures

== Sources ==
- "Former Kansas Governors". National Governors Association.
- "Governors". Kansas Historical Society.
- "Kansas Constitution". State Democracy Research Initiative. University of Wisconsin Law School.
- Dubin, Michael J. (2003). United States Gubernatorial Elections, 1776–1860: The Official Results by State and County. McFarland. ISBN 0-7864-1439-1 – via Internet Archive.
- Glashan, Roy R. (1979). American Governors and Gubernatorial Elections, 1775-1978. Meckler Books. ISBN 0-7201-1511-6 – via Internet Archive.
- Kallenbach, Joseph E.; Kallenbach, Jessamine S. (1977). American State Governors, 1776-1976. Oceana Publications. ISBN 978-0-379-00665-0 – via Internet Archive.
- McMullin, Thomas A.; Walker, David (1984). Biographical Directory of American Territorial Governors. Meckler Publishing. ISBN 0-930466-11-X – via Internet Archive.
- Mullaney, Marie Marmo (1994). Biographical Directory of the Governors of the United States, 1988–1994. Greenwood Publishing Group. ISBN 0-313-28312-5 – via Internet Archive.
- Sobel, Robert; Raimo, John (1978). Biographical Directory of the Governors of the United States, 1789-1978. Vol. 2. Meckler Books. ISBN 0-930466-01-2 – via Internet Archive.
- Thorpe, Francis Newton, ed. (1909). The Federal and State Constitutions, Colonial Charters, and Other Organic Laws of the States, Territories, and Colonies Now or Heretofore Forming the United States of America. Vol. 2. United States Government Publishing Office – via Internet Archive.
