= 1956 United States gubernatorial elections =

- November 6, 1956; September 10, 1956 (ME)

30 governorships (Note: Including a special election in Oregon.)
	Majority party	Minority party
Party	Democratic	Republican
Seats before	27	21
Seats after	29	19
Seat change	▲2	▼2
Seats up	14	16
Seats won	16	14
- Democratic gain Democratic hold Republican gain Republican hold

United States gubernatorial elections were held in 1956, in 30 states, concurrent with the House, Senate elections and the presidential election, on November 6, 1956 (September 10 in Maine). The special election in Oregon was due to the death of incumbent governor Paul L. Patterson on January 31.

This was the last time Colorado, Maine, and Ohio elected their governors to 2-year terms, all switching to 4-years from the 1958 election.

== Race summary ==
State	Governor	Party	First elected	Status	Candidates
Arizona	Ernest McFarland	Democratic	1954	Incumbent re-elected.	▌ ✓ Ernest McFarland (Democratic) 59.6%; ▌ Horace B. Griffen (Republican) 40.5%
Arkansas	Orval Faubus	Democratic	1954	Incumbent re-elected.	▌ ✓ Orval Faubus (Democratic) 80.7%; ▌ Roy Mitchell (Republican) 19.4%
Colorado	Edwin C. Johnson	Democratic	1954	Incumbent retired. Democratic hold.	▌ ✓ Stephen McNichols (Democratic) 51.3%; ▌ Donald G. Brotzman (Republican) 48.7%
Delaware	J. Caleb Boggs	Republican	1952	Incumbent re-elected.	▌ ✓ J. Caleb Boggs (Republican) 52.0%; ▌Elbert N. Carvel (Democratic) 48.1%
Florida	LeRoy Collins	Democratic	1954 (special)	Incumbent re-elected.	▌ ✓ LeRoy Collins (Democratic) 73.7%; ▌ William A. Washburne Jr. (Republican) 26.3%
Illinois	William Stratton	Republican	1952	Incumbent re-elected.	▌ ✓ William Stratton (Republican) 50.34%; ▌ Richard B. Austin (Democratic) 49.48%; ▌ Edward C. Gross (Socialist Labor) 0.18%
Indiana	George N. Craig	Republican	1952	Incumbent term-limited. Republican hold.	▌ ✓ Harold W. Handley (Republican) 55.6%; ▌ Ralph Tucker (Democratic) 44.0%; ▌ J. Ralston Miller (Prohibition) 0.35%; ▌ Merle N. Miller (Socialist Labor) 0.06%
Iowa	Leo Hoegh	Republican	1954	Incumbent lost re-election. Democratic gain.	▌ ✓ Herschel C. Loveless (Democratic) 51.2%; ▌ Leo Hoegh (Republican) 48.8%
Kansas	Fred Hall	Republican	1954	Incumbent lost renomination. Democratic gain.	▌ ✓ George Docking (Democratic) 55.4%; ▌Warren W. Shaw (Republican) 42.2%; ▌Harry O. Lytle Jr. (Prohibition) 2.4%
Maine	Edmund Muskie	Democratic	1954	Incumbent re-elected.	▌ ✓ Edmund Muskie (Democratic) 59.2%; ▌ Willis A. Trafton (Republican) 40.8%
Massachusetts	Christian Herter	Republican	1952	Incumbent retired. Democratic gain.	▌ ✓ Foster Furcolo (Democratic) 52.8%; ▌Sumner G. Whittier (Republican) 46.9%; ▌Henning A. Blomen (Socialist Labor) 0.25%; ▌Mark R. Shaw (Prohibition) 0.12%
Michigan	G. Mennen Williams	Democratic	1948	Incumbent re-elected.	▌ ✓ G. Mennen Williams (Democratic) 54.7%; ▌Albert Cobo (Republican) 45.1%; ▌Alfred T. Halsted (Prohibition) 0.2%
Minnesota	Orville Freeman	Democratic	1954	Incumbent re-elected.	▌ ✓ Orville Freeman (DFL) 51.4%; ▌ Ancher Nelsen (Republican) 48.2%; ▌ Rudolph Gustafson (Industrial Government) 0.4%
Missouri	Phil M. Donnelly	Democratic	1944; 1948 (term-limited); 1952	Incumbent term-limited. Democratic hold.	▌ ✓ James T. Blair Jr. (Democratic) 52.1%; ▌ Lon Hooker (Republican) 47.9%
Montana	J. Hugo Aronson	Republican	1952	Incumbent re-elected.	▌ ✓ J. Hugo Aronson (Republican) 51.4%; ▌ Arnold Olsen (Democratic) 48.6%
Nebraska	Victor Anderson	Republican	1954	Incumbent re-elected.	▌ ✓ Victor Anderson (Republican) 54.3%; ▌ Frank Sorrell (Democratic) 40.2%; ▌ George Morris (Independent) 5.6%
New Hampshire	Lane Dwinell	Republican	1954	Incumbent re-elected.	▌ ✓ Lane Dwinell (Republican) 54.7%; ▌ John Shaw (Democratic) 45.3%
New Mexico	John F. Simms	Democratic	1954	Incumbent lost re-election. Republican gain.	▌ ✓ Edwin L. Mechem (Republican) 52.2%; ▌John F. Simms (Democratic) 47.8%
North Carolina	Luther H. Hodges	Democratic	1954 (Note: Hodges became governor in 1954 when predecessor (William B. Umstead) died.)	Incumbent re-elected.	▌ ✓ Luther H. Hodges (Democratic) 67.0%; ▌ Kyle Hayes (Republican) 33.1%
North Dakota	Norman Brunsdale	Republican	1950	Incumbent retired. Republican hold.	▌ ✓ John E. Davis (Republican) 58.5%; ▌ Wallace E. Warner (Democratic-NPL) 41.5%
Ohio	Frank Lausche	Democratic	1944; 1946 (lost); 1948	Incumbent retired. Republican gain.	▌ ✓ C. William O'Neill (Republican) 56.0%; ▌ Michael DiSalle (Democratic) 44.0%
Oregon (special)	Elmo Smith	Republican	1956 (Note: Smith became governor on January 31, 1956 when predecessor (Paul L. Patterson) died.)	Incumbent lost re-election. Democratic gain.	▌ ✓ Robert D. Holmes (Democratic) 50.5%; ▌ Elmo Smith (Republican) 49.5%
Rhode Island	Dennis J. Roberts	Democratic	1950	Incumbent re-elected.	▌ ✓ Dennis J. Roberts (Democratic) 50.09%; ▌ Christopher Del Sesto (Republican) 49.91%
South Dakota	Joe Foss	Republican	1954	Incumbent re-elected.	▌ ✓ Joe Foss (Republican) 54.4%; ▌ Ralph Herseth (Democratic) 45.6%
Texas	Allan Shivers	Democratic	1949 (Note: Shivers became governor in 1949 when predecessor (Beauford H. Jester) died.)	Incumbent retired. Democratic hold.	▌ ✓ Price Daniel (Democratic) 78.4%; ▌ William R. Bryant (Republican) 15.2%; ▌ W. Lee O'Daniel (write-in) (Independent) 6.4%
Utah	J. Bracken Lee	Republican	1948	Incumbent lost renomination, but ran as an independent. Republican hold.	▌ ✓ George Dewey Clyde (Republican) 38.2%; ▌ L.C. "Rennie" Romney (Democratic) 33.4%; ▌ J. Bracken Lee (Independent) 28.4%
Vermont	Joseph B. Johnson	Republican	1954	Incumbent re-elected.	▌ ✓ Joseph B. Johnson (Republican) 57.5%; ▌ E. Frank Branon (Democratic) 42.5%
Washington	Arthur B. Langlie	Republican	1948	Incumbent retired. Democratic gain.	▌ ✓ Albert Rosellini (Democratic) 54.6%; ▌ Emmett T. Anderson (Republican) 45.0%; ▌ Henry Killman (Socialist Labor) 0.4%
West Virginia	William C. Marland	Democratic	1952	Incumbent term-limited. Republican gain.	▌ ✓ Cecil H. Underwood (Republican) 53.9%; ▌ Bob Mollohan (Democratic) 46.1%
Wisconsin	Walter J. Kohler Jr.	Republican	1950	Incumbent retired. Republican hold.	▌ ✓ Vernon Wallace Thomson (Republican) 51.9%; ▌William Proxmire (Democratic) 48.1%

== Closest races ==
States where the margin of victory was under 1%:

1. Rhode Island, 0.18%
2. Illinois, 0.86%

States where the margin of victory was under 5%:

1. Oregon, 1.04%
2. Iowa, 2.44%
3. Colorado, 2.68%
4. Montana, 2.74%
5. Minnesota, 3.23%
6. Wisconsin, 3.78%
7. Delaware, 3.90%
8. Missouri, 4.14%
9. New Mexico, 4.46%
10. Utah, 4.77%

States where the margin of victory was under 10%:

1. Massachusetts, 5.89%
2. West Virginia, 7.76%
3. South Dakota, 8.68%
4. New Hampshire, 9.46%
5. Michigan, 9.52%
6. Washington, 9.63%

Red denotes states won by Republicans. Blue denotes states won by Democrats.

== See also ==
- 1956 United States elections
  - 1956 United States presidential election
  - 1956 United States Senate elections
  - 1956 United States House of Representatives elections
