= 1964 Kansas gubernatorial election =

- November 3, 1964
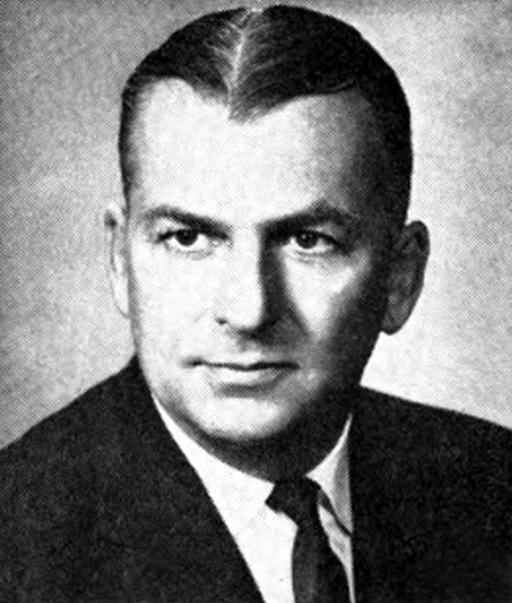

Nominee	William H. Avery	Harry G. Wiles
Party	Republican	Democratic
Popular vote	432,667	400,264
Percentage	50.88%	47.07%
- County results Avery: 40–50% 50–60% 60–70% Wiles: 40–50% 50–60% 60–70%
Governor before election
John Anderson Jr.
Republican
Elected Governor
William H. Avery
Republican

The 1964 Kansas gubernatorial election was held on November 3, 1964. Republican nominee William H. Avery defeated Democratic nominee Harry G. Wiles with 50.9% of the vote.

This was the last time in Kansas history that the elected Governor was of the same party as the outgoing Governor until 2026.

== Primary elections ==
Primary elections were held on August 4, 1964.

=== Democratic primary ===
==== Candidates ====
- Harry G. Wiles, Kansas Corporation Commissioner
- Jules V. Doty
- George Hart, former Kansas State Treasurer
- Joseph W. Henkle Sr., former Lieutenant Governor
- J. Donald Coffin
- Ewell Stewart

==== Results ====
Democratic primary results
Party	Candidate	Votes	%
Democratic	Harry G. Wiles	50,590	32.41
Democratic	Jules V. Doty	37,305	23.90
Democratic	George Hart	30,973	19.84
Democratic	Joseph W. Henkle Sr.	21,304	13.65
Democratic	J. Donald Coffin	9,140	5.86
Democratic	Ewell Stewart	6,783	4.35
Total votes		156,095	100.00

=== Republican primary ===
==== Candidates ====
- William H. Avery, U.S. Representative
- McDill "Huck" Boyd, Newspaper publisher
- Paul R. Wunsch, President of the Kansas Senate
- William M. Ferguson, Kansas Attorney General
- Harold H. Chase, incumbent Lieutenant Governor
- Albert S. Myers
- Dell Crozier

==== Results ====
Republican primary results
Party	Candidate	Votes	%
Republican	William H. Avery	85,745	30.39
Republican	McDill "Huck" Boyd	75,451	26.74
Republican	Paul R. Wunsch	71,601	25.38
Republican	William M. Ferguson	36,622	12.98
Republican	Harold H. Chase	8,397	2.98
Republican	Albert S. Myers	1,615	0.57
Republican	Dell Crozier	1,604	0.57
Total votes		282,163	100.00

== General election ==
=== Candidates ===
Major party candidates

- William H. Avery, Republican
- Harry G. Wiles, Democratic

Other candidates

- Kenneth L. Myers, Independent
- Harry E. Livermore, Prohibition

=== Results ===
1964 Kansas gubernatorial election
Party	Candidate	Votes	%	±%
Republican	William H. Avery	432,667	50.88%	
Democratic	Harry G. Wiles	400,264	47.07%	
Independent	Kenneth L. Myers	11,816	1.39%	
Prohibition	Harry E. Livermore	5,667	0.67%	
Majority		32,403		
Turnout		850,414		
Republican hold		Swing		
