= Dale E. Saffels =

American judge

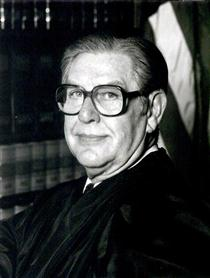

Senior Judge of the United States District Court for the District of Kansas
- In office November 16, 1990 – November 14, 2002

Judge of the United States District Court for the District of Kansas
- In office November 2, 1979 – November 16, 1990
- Appointed by: Jimmy Carter
- Preceded by: Seat established by 92 Stat. 1629
- Succeeded by: John Watson Lungstrum

Member of the Kansas House of Representatives from the 115th district
- In office 1955–1963

Personal details
- Born: Dale Emerson Saffels; August 13, 1921 Moline, Kansas
- Died: November 14, 2002 (aged 81) Topeka, Kansas
- Party: Democratic
- Education: Emporia State University (BA); Washburn University School of Law (JD)

Dale Emerson Saffels (August 13, 1921 – November 14, 2002) was an American lawyer, legislator, and United States district judge of the United States District Court for the District of Kansas.

== Education and military service ==
Saffels was born in Moline, Kansas. He volunteered for the United States Army in 1942, during World War II and was sworn in on his twenty-first birthday. On February 19, 1943, Saffels was commissioned as a second lieutenant in the Signal Corps. Saffels commanded the 1373rd Signal Company in the European Theater of Operations and achieved the rank of major by the time of his discharge in 1946. He received a Bachelor of Arts degree in history and business from Emporia State Teachers College (now Emporia State University) in 1947. He received a Juris Doctor, cum laude, from Washburn University School of Law in 1949.

== Legal and political career ==
Saffels was in private practice in Garden City, Kansas from 1949 to 1979. A Democrat, he was elected County Attorney of Finney County in 1950 and reelected in 1952, serving from 1951 to 1955. In 1954, Saffels defeated an incumbent Republican to win a Kansas House of Representatives seat. He was reelected four times, serving from 1955 to 1963, and was minority leader from 1961 to 1963. Saffels's major legislative activities included supporting a retirement plan for state employees and making the Wichita University of Wichita into a state university. Saffels was "an early advocate for public education television in Kansas." He also was a good government advocate, supporting election law reform, conflict of interest laws, and legislative reapportionment. Saffels ran for governor of Kansas in 1962 against the incumbent, John Anderson, Jr.; Saffels lost, although a Democrat, Robert Docking, won four years later, in 1966. In 1967, Docking appointed Dale to the Kansas Corporation Commission, which regulates utilities in the state. Dale served on the commission from 1967 to 1975, chairing that body from 1968 to 1975. Following this, Dale returned to private practice, in Topeka from 1971 to 1975, and in Wichita from 1975 to 1979.

== Federal judicial service ==
With the support of United States Senators Bob Dole and Nancy Kassebaum, Saffels was nominated by President Jimmy Carter on September 28, 1979, to the United States District Court for the District of Kansas, to a new seat created by 92 Stat. 1629. He was confirmed by the United States Senate on October 31, 1979, and received his commission on November 2, 1979. He assumed senior status on November 16, 1990. Saffels handled all the federal habeas corpus litigation in Kansas from 1980 to 1995, a total of 3,754 cases. His service was terminated on November 14, 2002, due to his death in Topeka. He is buried in Moline.

== Personal life ==
Saffels was a member of the Lutheran Church–Missouri Synod. He was twice married, with a son and two daughters. Each year, Saffels would go deep-sea fishing off Padre Island, Texas.

== Sources ==
Legal offices
| Preceded by Seat established by 92 Stat. 1629 | Judge of the United States District Court for the District of Kansas; 1979–1990 | Succeeded by John Watson Lungstrum |
Party political offices
| Preceded by George Docking | Democratic nominee for Governor of Kansas; 1962 | Succeeded by Harry G. Wiles |
