= Governor Docking =

Governor Docking may refer to:

- George Docking (1904–1964), 35th Governor of Kansas
- Robert Docking (1925–1983), 38th Governor of Kansas
