= John Anderson Jr. =

American politician (1917–2014)

John Anderson
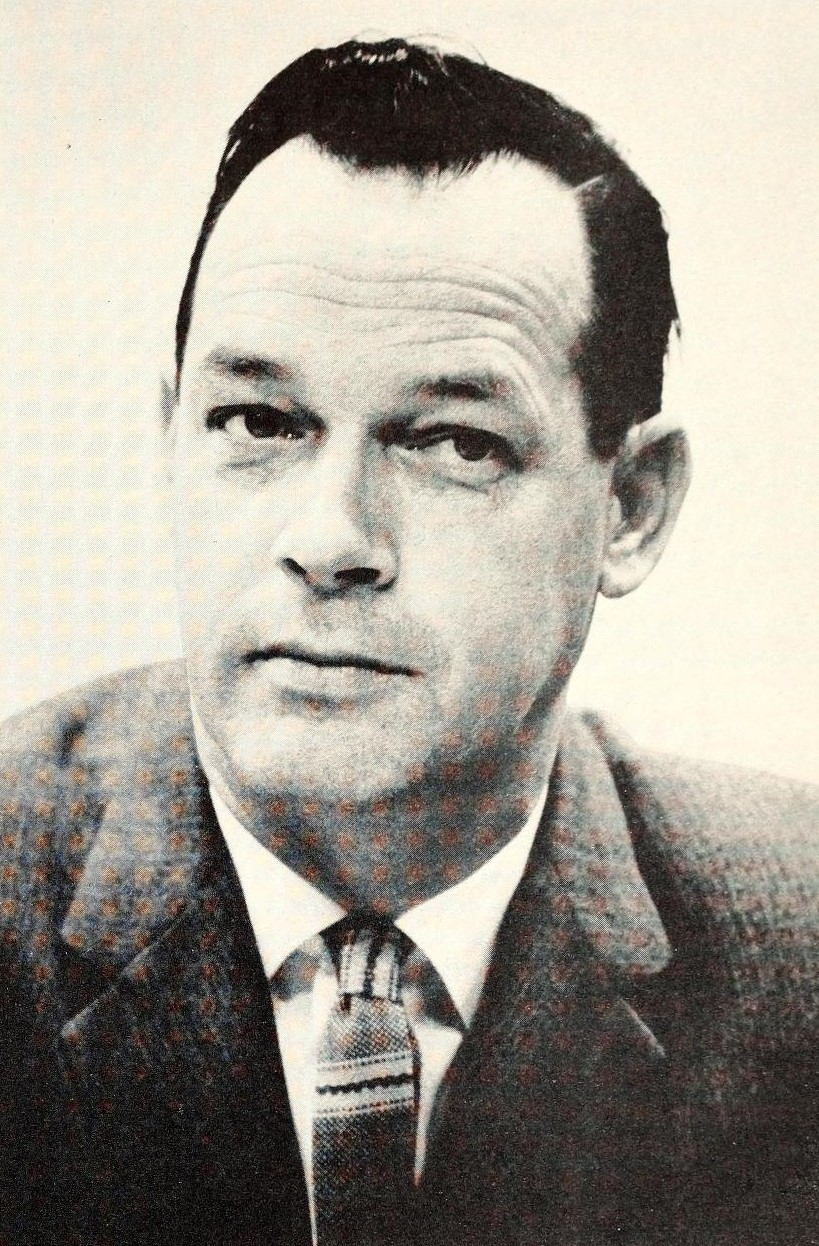

36th Governor of Kansas
- In office January 9, 1961 – January 11, 1965
- Lieutenant: Harold H. Chase
- Preceded by: George Docking
- Succeeded by: William H. Avery

Chair of the National Governors Association
- In office July 21, 1963 – June 6, 1964
- Preceded by: Albert Rosellini
- Succeeded by: Grant Sawyer

33rd Kansas Attorney General
- In office March 1, 1956 – January 9, 1961
- Governor: Fred Hall; John McCuish; George Docking
- Preceded by: Harold Fatzer
- Succeeded by: William M. Ferguson

Member of the Kansas Senate from the 6th district
- In office January 13, 1953 – March 1, 1956
- Preceded by: K. U. Snyder
- Succeeded by: James B. Pearson

Personal details
- Born: May 8, 1917 Olathe, Kansas, U.S.
- Died: September 15, 2014 (aged 97) Olathe, Kansas, U.S.
- Party: Republican
- Spouse: Arlene Auchard
- Education: Kansas State University; University of Kansas (BA, LLB)

John Anderson Jr. (May 8, 1917 – September 15, 2014) was an American politician who served as the 36th governor of Kansas, from 1961 until 1965. A member of the Republican Party, he previously was the 33rd attorney general of Kansas from 1956 until 1961.

== Life and career ==
Anderson was born near Olathe, Kansas, to John and Ora Bookout Anderson. He graduated from Olathe High School in 1935. From there he went on to Kansas State College of Agriculture and Applied Science, and later transferred to the University of Kansas. In 1943 he graduated from the University of Kansas, and from the University of Kansas Law School the following year. He did not qualify for military service during World War II for physical reasons. Instead, he spent two years, from 1944 to 1946, on the staff of Federal Judge Walter A. Huxman. Later in 1946, Anderson opened his own law practice in Olathe.

Soon after establishing his law practice, Anderson entered politics by running for county attorney of Johnson County as a Republican. Anderson won this election, as well as two following elections and served in this capacity until 1953.

Beginning in 1952, Anderson sought to elevate his political career by running for a seat in the Kansas State Senate. Again he was successful, holding his office until March 1, 1956. At that time, he was appointed to fill the unexpired term as attorney general. Once in this elective office, Anderson won the two following elections in 1956 and 1958. Anderson was part of "The Young Turks", a reform-minded group of Republicans who backed Fred Hall as governor, and opposed right-to-work laws like the governor himself.

By 1960, Anderson was ready for bigger ambitions and entered the race for the office of governor in the election of that year. He defeated the Democratic incumbent, George Docking, 511,534 to 402,261 (the Prohibition candidate received 8,727). In keeping with his tradition for winning elections in pairs, Anderson also won the 1962 Gubernatorial election. Anderson became the first governor of Kansas to occupy Cedar Crest, which had just been renovated at a cost of one hundred thousand dollars.

During his time as governor, Anderson increased funding for every grade level in the state's education system, and added Wichita State University to the Board of Regents system. A state technical institute in Salina was established and a number of vocational technical schools were opened. Under Anderson's watch, the number of public school districts went from a thousand to 303 districts. The state's medical and mental hospital systems were reorganized and expanded, the pardon and parole system were reformed, new highways were built, a public employee retirement fund was established, and a program was set up to use federal funds to assist children of low-income families. Because of his efforts to fund and improve education in Kansas, Anderson was nicknamed the "Education Governor".

Anderson also sought to advance civil rights in Kansas. In his 1961 inaugural speech, Anderson said: "The forward push of certain minority groups for equal places in our society have been [sic] greatly dramatized in recent years in the southern states... America is moving forward into an era of greater opportunity for some groups and less privilege for other groups. Kansas will not escape this mighty force."

“When you get a problem that might seem to be political, many times [it] is not as much political as just a genuine problem of something needing to be done and needing the money to do it. That’s not Republican or Democrat, that’s just a problem for the people... The poor, the rich, the humble, the proud, the strong, the weak, the fortunate and the unfortunate must be the beneficiaries in the years to come of a government progressively administered in the interests of all the people.”

— Anderson on his governing philosophy

In 1964, Anderson chose not to seek re-election, but instead, went back to his law practice in Olathe. Anderson supported New York governor Nelson Rockefeller in the 1964 Republican Party presidential primaries and opposed Barry Goldwater as the party's presidential nominee. On Goldwater's defeat in 1964, Anderson remarked: "This Goldwater ideology, the thing he called conservatism was beaten. It lost in every state. In the South, prejudice voted, not his philosophy, and in Arizona they voted hometown. These Goldwater people have got to roll over. They’re beaten." He remained active in public service after leaving the governor's office, serving as an attorney for the Board of Healing Arts and the Kansas Turnpike Authority. In addition, he served as the director of the Citizens' Conference on State Legislatures from 1965 to 1972. He was nominated for federal judgeships on a number of occasions, but was never appointed. Again, in 1972 he tried for the Republican Party nomination for governor, but was defeated by Morris Kay.

After leaving the Governor's office, Anderson retired to his native Olathe.

Anderson died September 15, 2014, at the age of 97.

== Legacy ==
K-10 in Johnson County, Kansas, is named in Anderson's honor.

== Notes ==
Legal offices
Preceded by Harold Fatzer	Kansas Attorney General; 1956–1961	Succeeded by William M. Ferguson
Party political offices
Preceded by Harold Ralph Fatzer	Republican nominee for Kansas Attorney General; 1956, 1958	Succeeded by William M. Ferguson
Preceded by Clyde Reed	Republican nominee for Governor of Kansas; 1960, 1962	Succeeded by William Avery
Political offices
Preceded by George Docking	Governor of Kansas; 1961–1965	Succeeded by William Avery
Preceded by Albert Rosellini	Chair of the National Governors Association; 1963–1964	Succeeded by Grant Sawyer
