= Warren Shaw =

Warren Shaw may refer to:

- Warren Shaw (sound editor), American sound editor
- Warren W. Shaw, American judge and politician
- Warren Wilbur Shaw, American racing driver
