= 1962 Kansas gubernatorial election =

- November 6, 1962
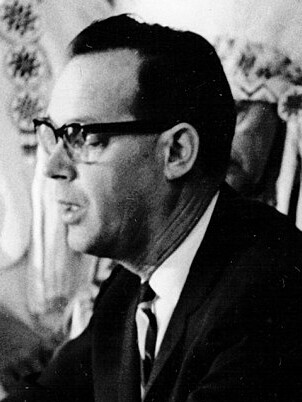

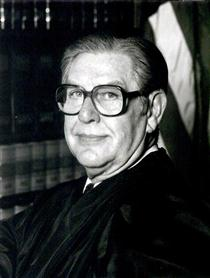
Nominee	John Anderson Jr.	Dale E. Saffels
Party	Republican	Democratic
Popular vote	341,257	291,285
Percentage	53.42%	45.60%
- County results Anderson: 40–50% 50–60% 60–70% 70–80% Saffels: 40–50% 50–60% 60–70%
Governor before election
John Anderson Jr.
Republican
Elected Governor
John Anderson Jr.
Republican

The 1962 Kansas gubernatorial election was held on November 6, 1962. Incumbent Republican John Anderson Jr. defeated Democratic nominee Dale E. Saffels with 53.4% of the vote.

== Primary elections ==
Primary elections were held on August 7, 1962.

=== Democratic primary ===
==== Candidates ====
- Dale E. Saffels, State Representative
- George Hart, former Kansas State Treasurer

==== Results ====
Democratic primary results
Party	Candidate	Votes	%
Democratic	Dale E. Saffels	69,728	59.71
Democratic	George Hart	47,055	40.29
Total votes		116,783	100.00

=== Republican primary ===
==== Candidates ====
- John Anderson Jr., incumbent Governor
- Harvey F. Crouch

==== Results ====
Republican primary results
Party	Candidate	Votes	%
Republican	John Anderson Jr. (incumbent)	164,888	84.08
Republican	Harvey F. Crouch	31,221	15.92
Total votes		196,109	100.00

== General election ==
=== Candidates ===
Major party candidates

- John Anderson Jr., Republican
- Dale E. Saffels, Democratic

Other candidates

- Vearl Bacon, Prohibition

=== Results ===
1962 Kansas gubernatorial election
Party	Candidate	Votes	%	±%
Republican	John Anderson Jr. (incumbent)	341,257	53.42%	
Democratic	Dale E. Saffels	291,285	45.60%	
Prohibition	Vearl Bacon	6,248	0.98%	
Majority		49,972		
Turnout		638,798		
Republican hold		Swing		
