= 1936 Kansas gubernatorial election =

- November 3, 1936
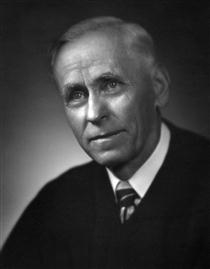

Nominee	Walter A. Huxman	Will G. West
Party	Democratic	Republican
Popular vote	433,319	411,446
Percentage	51.09%	48.52%
- County results Huxman: 50–60% 60–70% 70–80% West: 50–60% 60–70%
Governor before election
Alf Landon
Republican
Elected Governor
Walter A. Huxman
Democratic

The 1936 Kansas gubernatorial election was held on November 3, 1936. Democratic nominee Walter A. Huxman defeated Republican nominee Will G. West with 51.09% of the vote. Incumbent Governor Alf Landon did not seek reelection, and instead unsuccessfully ran for President and failing to win Kansas in the presidential race.

== Primary elections ==
Primary elections were held on August 4, 1936.

=== Democratic primary ===
==== Candidates ====
- Walter A. Huxman, former Kansas State Tax Commissioner
- Jonathan M. Davis, former Governor

==== Results ====
Democratic primary results
Party	Candidate	Votes	%
Democratic	Walter A. Huxman	91,108	59.28
Democratic	Jonathan M. Davis	62,596	40.73
Total votes		153,704	100.00

== General election ==
=== Candidates ===
Major party candidates

- Walter A. Huxman, Democratic
- Will G. West, Republican

Other candidates

- George M. Whiteside, Socialist

=== Results ===
1936 Kansas gubernatorial election
Party	Candidate	Votes	%	±%
Democratic	Walter A. Huxman	433,319	51.09%	
Republican	Will G. West	411,446	48.52%	
Socialist	George M. Whiteside	3,318	0.39%	
Majority		21,873		
Turnout				
Democratic gain from Republican		Swing		
