= 1958 Kansas gubernatorial election =

- November 4, 1958
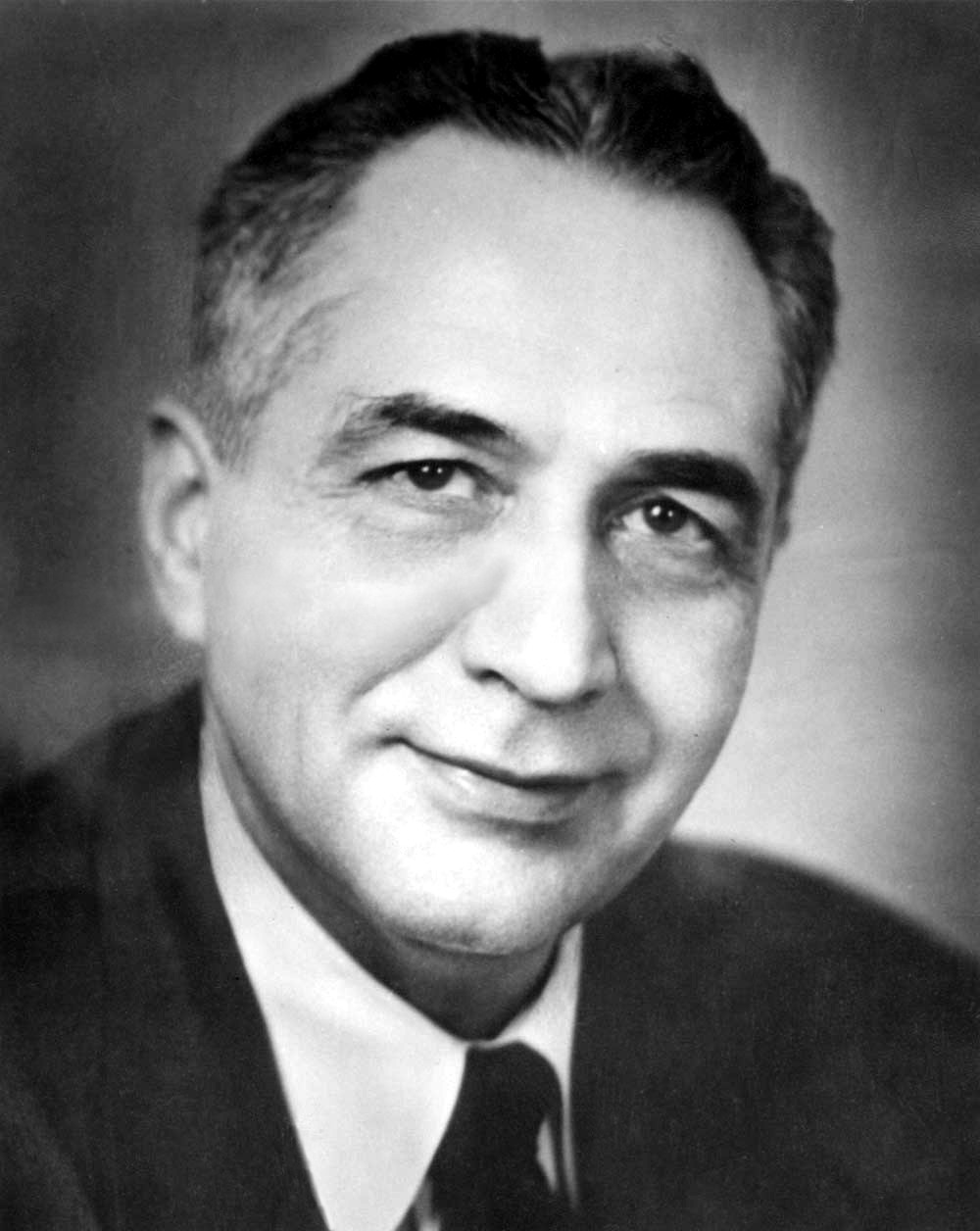

Nominee	George Docking	Clyde M. Reed Jr.
Party	Democratic	Republican
Popular vote	415,506	313,036
Percentage	56.46%	42.54%
- County results Docking: 40–50% 50–60% 60–70% Reed: 50–60% Tie: 40–50%
Governor before election
George Docking
Democratic
Elected Governor
George Docking
Democratic

The 1958 Kansas gubernatorial election was held on November 4, 1958. Incumbent Democrat George Docking defeated Republican nominee Clyde M. Reed Jr. with 56.46% of the vote.

== Primary elections ==
Primary elections were held on August 5, 1958.

=== Republican primary ===
==== Candidates ====
- Clyde M. Reed Jr., Newspaper publisher
- Fred Hall, former Governor
- John S. Stevens
- Walter L. Cherry
- Harvey F. Crouch

==== Results ====
Republican primary results
Party	Candidate	Votes	%
Republican	Clyde M. Reed Jr.	142,247	72.65
Republican	Fred Hall	35,632	18.20
Republican	John S. Stevens	8,781	4.49
Republican	Walter L. Cherry	4,598	2.35
Republican	Harvey F. Crouch	4,543	2.32
Total votes		195,801	100.00

== General election ==
=== Candidates ===
Major party candidates

- George Docking, Democratic
- Clyde M. Reed Jr., Republican

Other candidates

- Warren C. Martin, Prohibition

=== Results ===
1958 Kansas gubernatorial election
Party	Candidate	Votes	%	±%
Democratic	George Docking (incumbent)	415,506	56.46%	
Republican	Clyde M. Reed Jr.	313,036	42.54%	
Prohibition	Warren C. Martin	7,397	1.01%	
Majority		102,470		
Turnout		735,939		
Democratic hold		Swing		
