= 1942 Kansas gubernatorial election =

- November 3, 1942
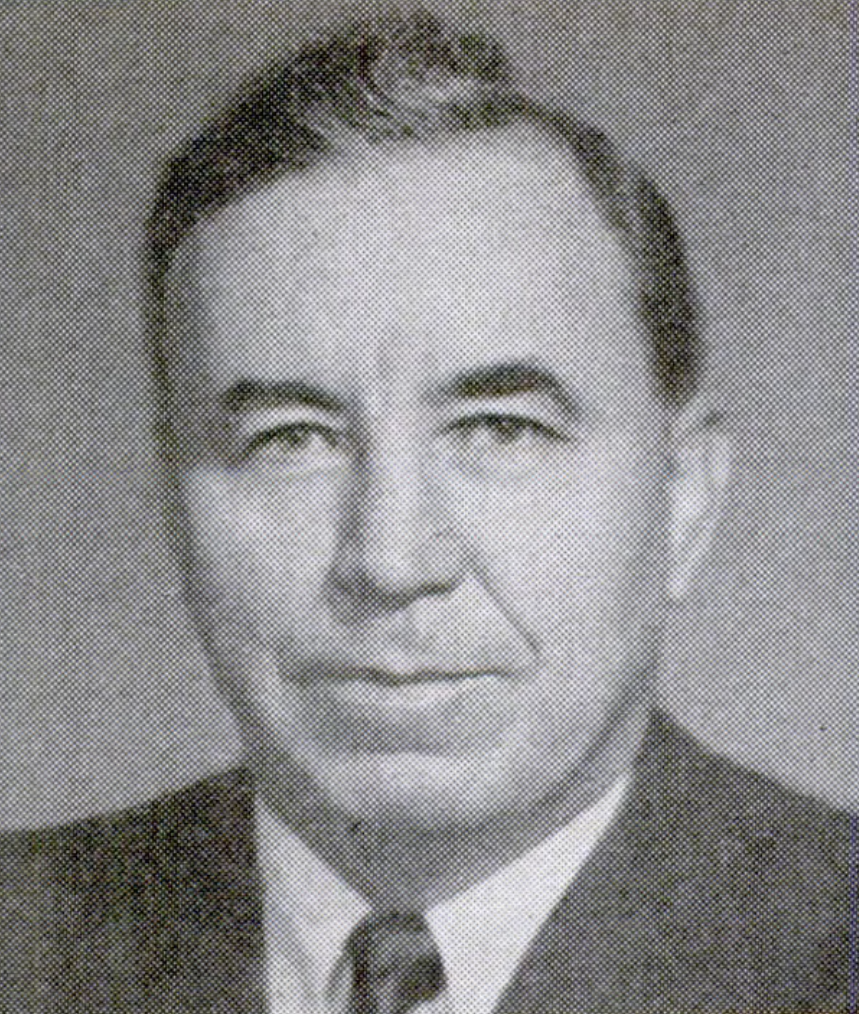

Nominee	Andrew Frank Schoeppel	William H. Burke
Party	Republican	Democratic
Popular vote	287,895	212,071
Percentage	56.68%	41.75%
- County results Schoeppel: 40–50% 50–60% 60–70% Burke: 40–50% 50–60%
Governor before election
Payne Ratner
Republican
Elected Governor
Andrew Frank Schoeppel
Republican

The 1942 Kansas gubernatorial election was held on November 3, 1942. Republican nominee Andrew Frank Schoeppel defeated Democratic nominee William H. Burke with 56.68% of the vote.

== Primary elections ==
Primary elections were held on August 4, 1942.

=== Democratic primary ===
==== Candidates ====
- William H. Burke, businessman
- Paul B. Green

==== Results ====
Democratic primary results
Party	Candidate	Votes	%
Democratic	William H. Burke	70,592	92.97
Democratic	Paul B. Green	5,340	7.03
Total votes		75,932	100.00

=== Republican primary ===
==== Candidates ====
- Andrew Frank Schoeppel, Chairman of the Kansas Corporation Commission
- Carl E. Friend, incumbent Lieutenant Governor
- Clyde M. Reed, United States Senator
- Thale P. Skovgard

==== Results ====
Republican primary results
Party	Candidate	Votes	%
Republican	Andrew Frank Schoeppel	65,379	37.04
Republican	Carl E. Friend	56,972	32.28
Republican	Clyde M. Reed	44,613	25.27
Republican	Thale P. Skovgard	9,557	5.41
Total votes		176,521	100.00

== General election ==
=== Candidates ===
Major party candidates

- Andrew Frank Schoeppel, Republican
- William H. Burke, Democratic

Other candidates

- David C. White, Prohibition
- Ida A. Beloof, Socialist

=== Results ===
1942 Kansas gubernatorial election
Party	Candidate	Votes	%	±%
Republican	Andrew Frank Schoeppel	287,895	56.68%	
Democratic	William H. Burke	212,071	41.75%	
Prohibition	David C. White	6,510	1.28%	
Socialist	Ida A. Beloof	1,453	0.29%	
Majority		75,824		
Turnout				
Republican hold		Swing		
