= Andrew Frank Schoeppel =

American politician (1894–1962)

Andrew Schoeppel
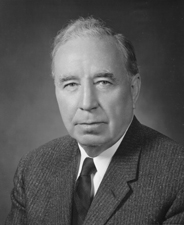

United States Senator from Kansas
- In office January 3, 1949 – January 21, 1962
- Preceded by: Arthur Capper
- Succeeded by: James B. Pearson

29th Governor of Kansas
- In office January 11, 1943 – January 13, 1947
- Lieutenant: Jess C. Denious
- Preceded by: Payne Ratner
- Succeeded by: Frank Carlson

Personal details
- Born: November 23, 1894 Barton County, Kansas, U.S.
- Died: January 21, 1962 (aged 67) Bethesda, Maryland, U.S.
- Party: Republican
- Spouse: Marie Thomsen
- Education: University of Kansas; University of Nebraska (J.D.)
- Profession: Attorney, politician

Military service
- Branch/service: United States Navy
- Battles/wars: World War I
- Coaching career

Playing career
- 1920–1922: Nebraska
- Position: End

Coaching career (HC unless noted)
- 1929: Fort Hays State

Head coaching record
- Overall: 2–5

Andrew Frank Schoeppel (November 23, 1894 – January 21, 1962) was an American politician and a member of the Republican Party. He was the 29th governor of Kansas from 1943 to 1947 and a U.S. senator from 1949 until his death. He was born in 1894 in Claflin, Kansas, and died in 1962 of abdominal cancer at the National Naval Medical Center at Bethesda, Maryland.

== Early life and political career ==
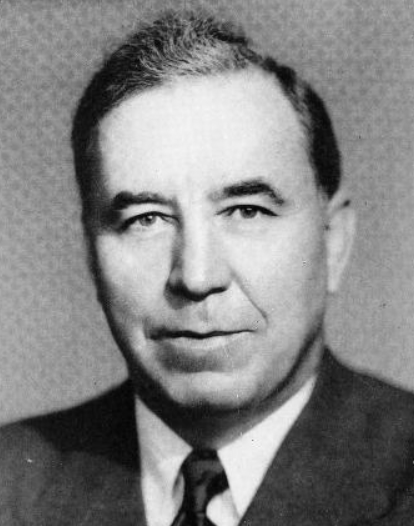
Schoeppel as governor

Schoeppel was born near Claflin, Kansas, to immigrant parents from Bohemia. He attended public school and the University of Kansas, but left college to join the Naval Air Service during World War I. After returning home, he graduated from the University of Nebraska Law School in 1922 and was admitted to the Kansas bar the next year.

His early political life began as county attorney in Ness County, Kansas, and was one of the early local officials for Ness City. Later he was elected mayor of Ness City and also served as chairman of the Kansas Corporation Commission.

In 1952 Schoeppel supported Senator Robert A. Taft for president over fellow Kansan Dwight D. Eisenhower.

Schoeppel voted in favor of the Civil Rights Act of 1957, but did not vote on the Civil Rights Act of 1960.

== College football ==
Schoeppel played college football from 1920 to 1922 while attending the University of Nebraska and made "honorable mention" on one of Walter Camp's first All-America football teams. He served as the head football coach at Fort Hays State University for one season, in 1929, compiling a record of 2–5. Schoeppel filled in as head coach while his predecessor, William D. Weidein, was on sabbatical. Weidein did not return after his one-year sabbatical. After Schoeppel completed his one year as head coach, the school's program was taken over by W. C. "Jack" Riley.

=== Head coaching record ===
Year	Team	Overall	Conference	Standing	Bowl/playoffs
Fort Hays State Tigers (Central Intercollegiate Conference) (1929)
1929	Fort Hays State	2–5	2–4	T–5th	
Fort Hays State:		2–5	2–4		
Total:		2–5			

== See also ==
- List of members of the United States Congress who died in office (1950–1999)

Party political offices
Preceded by Payne Ratner	Republican nominee for Governor of Kansas; 1942, 1944	Succeeded by Frank Carlson
Preceded by Arthur Capper	Republican nominee for U.S. Senator from Kansas (Class 2); 1948, 1954, 1960	Succeeded by James B. Pearson
Political offices
Preceded by Payne Ratner	Governor of Kansas; 1943–1947	Succeeded by Frank Carlson
U.S. Senate
Preceded by Arthur Capper	U.S. senator (Class 2) from Kansas; 1949–1962; Served alongside: Clyde M. Reed, Harry Darby, Frank Carlson	Succeeded by James B. Pearson
Preceded by John W. Bricker	Ranking Member of the Senate Commerce Committee; 1959–1962	Succeeded by John Marshall Butler
