= 1938 Kansas gubernatorial election =

- November 8, 1938
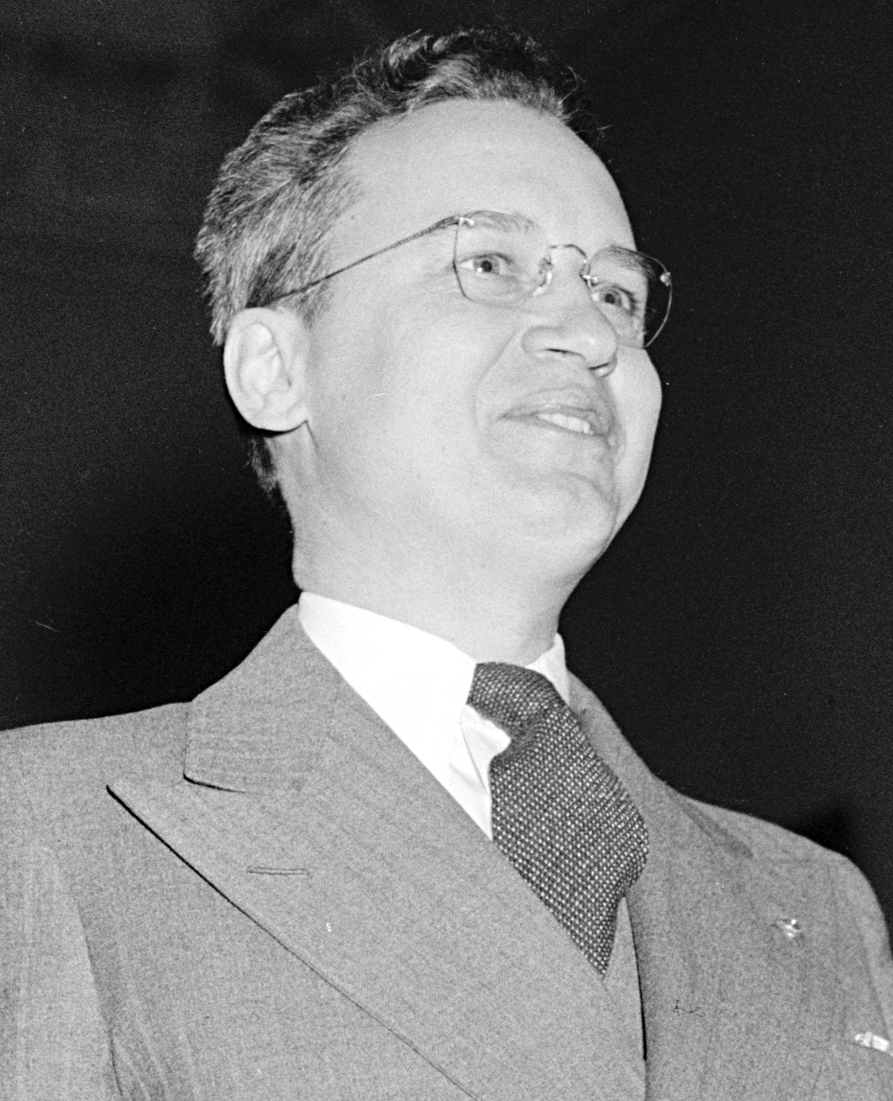

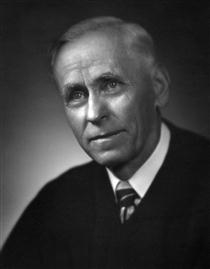
| Nominee | Payne Ratner | Walter A. Huxman |
| Party | Republican | Democratic |
| Popular vote | 393,989 | 341,271 |
| Percentage | 52.10% | 45.13% |
- County results Ratner: 40–50% 50–60% 60–70% Huxman: 40–50% 50–60%
Governor before election
Walter A. Huxman
Democratic
Elected Governor
Payne Ratner
Republican

The 1938 Kansas gubernatorial election was held on November 8, 1938. Republican nominee Payne Ratner defeated Democratic incumbent Walter A. Huxman with 52.10% of the vote.

== Primary elections ==
Primary elections were held on August 2, 1938.

=== Republican primary ===
==== Candidates ====
- Payne Ratner, State Senator
- Harold C. McGugin, former U.S. Representative
- Charles W. Thompson, former Lieutenant Governor
- Carl Newcomer

==== Results ====
Republican primary results
| Party | Candidate | Votes | % |
|---|---|---|---|
| Republican | Payne Ratner | 104,241 | 40.59 |
| Republican | Harold C. McGugin | 72,815 | 28.35 |
| Republican | Charles W. Thompson | 52,872 | 20.59 |
| Republican | Carl Newcomer | 26,906 | 10.48 |
| Total votes | | 256,834 | 100.00 |

== General election ==
=== Candidates ===
Major party candidates

- Payne Ratner, Republican
- Walter A. Huxman, Democratic

Other candidates

- Jonathan M. Davis, Independent
- C. Floyd Hester, Prohibition
- Ida A. Beloof, Socialist

=== Results ===
1938 Kansas gubernatorial election
| Party | Candidate | Votes | % | ±% |
|---|---|---|---|---|
| Republican | Payne Ratner | 393,989 | 52.10% | |
| Democratic | Walter A. Huxman (incumbent) | 341,271 | 45.13% | |
| Independent | Jonathan M. Davis | 15,065 | 1.99% | |
| Prohibition | C. Floyd Hester | 4,337 | 0.57% | |
| Socialist | Ida A. Beloof | 1,496 | 0.20% | |
| Majority | | 52,718 | | |
| Turnout | | | | |
| Republican gain from Democratic | | Swing | | |
