= John McCuish =

Governor of Kansas in 1957

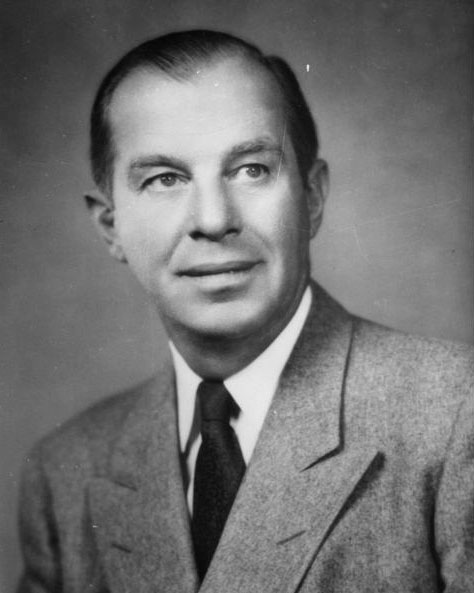

34th Governor of Kansas
- In office January 3, 1957 – January 14, 1957
- Lieutenant: Vacant
- Preceded by: Fred Hall
- Succeeded by: George Docking

32nd Lieutenant Governor of Kansas
- In office January 10, 1955 – January 3, 1957
- Governor: Fred Hall
- Preceded by: Fred Hall
- Succeeded by: Joseph W. Henkle, Sr.

Personal details
- Born: June 22, 1906 Leadville, Colorado, U.S.
- Died: March 12, 1962 (aged 55) Newton, Kansas, U.S.
- Party: Republican
- Spouse: Cora Hedrick
- Education: Washburn University
- Profession: Advertising salesman, newspaper editor, politician

John Berridge McCuish (June 22, 1906 – March 12, 1962) was the 34th governor of Kansas. A member of the Republican Party, McCuish is best known for his 11-day tenure as Kansas' governor, during which he appointed his immediate predecessor to the Kansas Supreme Court. The episode, dubbed the "Triple Play of 1956", spurred legislation designed to prevent it from happening again.

== Biography ==
McCuish was born in Leadville, Colorado, and attended Kemper Military School in Boonville, Missouri, before graduating from Washburn University in Topeka, Kansas, in 1925. He married Cora E. Hedrick on September 9, 1925.

== Career ==
McCuish began his journalism career as a newspaper-advertising salesman. He became owner and editor of the Hillsboro Star and returned to Newton, Kansas, and owned and edited the Harvey County News from 1930 to 1958. He was a delegate to the Republican National Convention in 1936.

McCuish entered the U.S. Army to serve in World War II as a private and participated in the Anzio landings. He also aided the American Red Cross in Germany. After returning from Germany, McCuish held several positions with the Kansas Republican Party including being a delegate to the Republican National Convention in 1948. In 1954, McCuish was elected Lieutenant Governor of Kansas, and served under Governor Fred Hall.

In 1956, Hall sought reelection as governor, but failed to win the nomination of the Kansas Republican Party. After voters chose Democrat George Docking as their next governor, an unprecedented series of events transpired. On December 31, 1956, William Smith, chief justice of the Kansas Supreme Court resigned so that a Republican governor might appoint his successor. Hall then resigned on January 3, 1957, making McCuish governor of Kansas for the 11 days remaining before Docking's inauguration. McCuish then appointed Hall to the State Supreme Court. The episode, which was dubbed "the triple play of 1956," was legal but widely considered unethical. The move spurred the Kansas Legislature to pass, with 70 percent of the vote, an amendment to the state constitution requiring justices to be chosen with a merit system.

After leaving office, McCuish returned to the newspaper business, but continued to be politically active. He became an independent oil operator and sold his newspaper.

== Death ==
McCuish died after suffering a stroke and is interred at Greenwood Cemetery in Newton.

Party political offices
Preceded by Fred Hall	Republican nominee for Lieutenant Governor of Kansas; 1954, 1956	Succeeded by Glenn D. Cogswell
Political offices
Preceded by Fred Hall	Lieutenant Governor of Kansas; 1955–1957	Succeeded by Joseph W. Henkle Sr.
Preceded by Fred Hall	Governor of Kansas; January 3, 1957 – January 14, 1957	Succeeded by George Docking
