= Fred Hall =

33rd Governor of Kansas

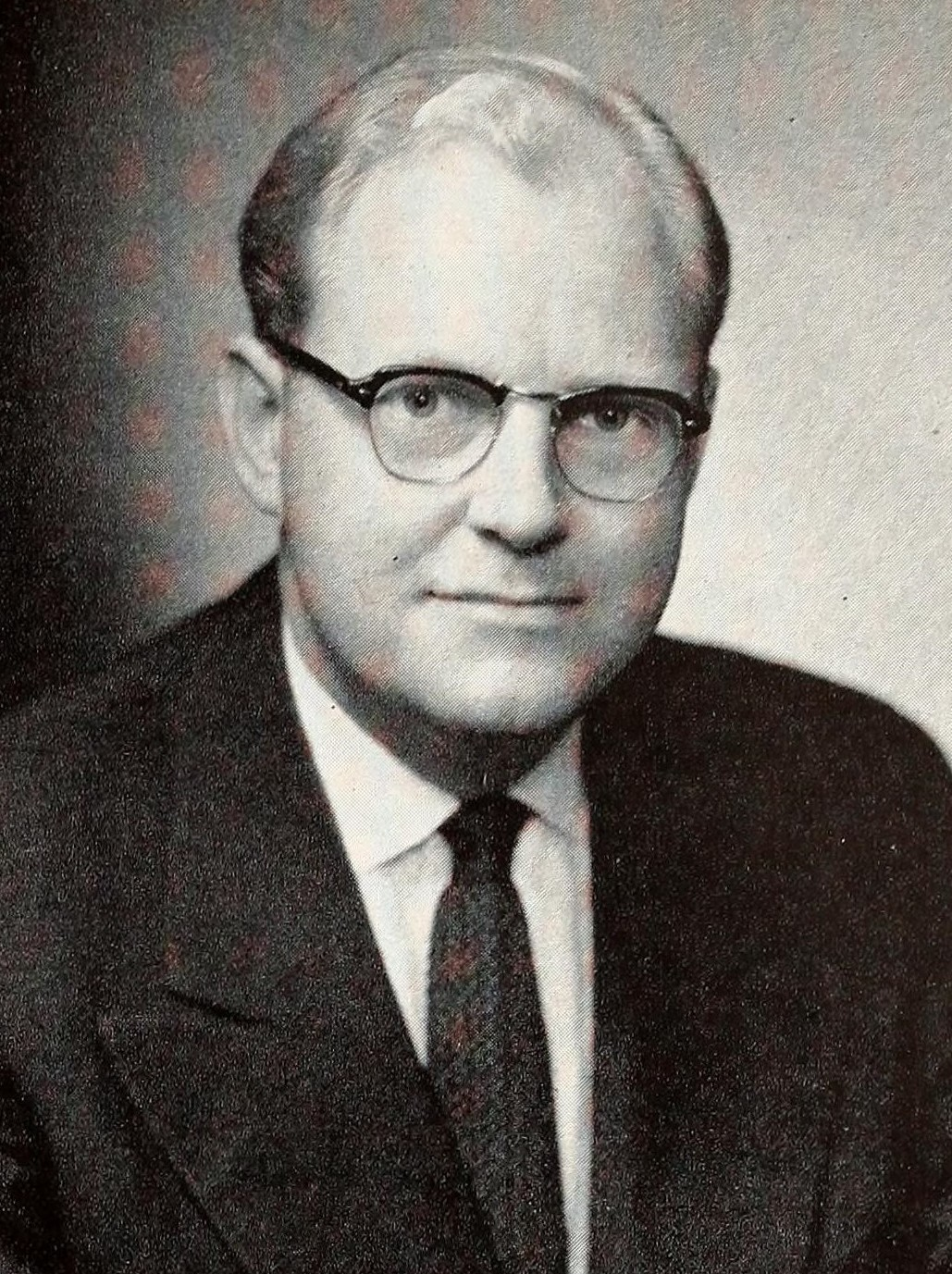

Justice of the Kansas Supreme Court
- In office January 3, 1957 – April 7, 1958
- Governor: John McCuish; George Docking
- Preceded by: Walter G. Thiele
- Succeeded by: Schuyler W. Jackson

33rd Governor of Kansas
- In office January 10, 1955 – January 3, 1957
- Lieutenant: John McCuish
- Preceded by: Edward F. Arn
- Succeeded by: John McCuish

31st Lieutenant Governor of Kansas
- In office January 8, 1951 – January 10, 1955
- Governor: Edward F. Arn
- Preceded by: Frank L. Hagaman
- Succeeded by: John McCuish

Personal details
- Born: July 24, 1916 Dodge City, Kansas, U.S.
- Died: March 18, 1970 (aged 53) Shawnee, Kansas, U.S.
- Party: Republican
- Spouse: Leadell Schneider
- Children: 1
- Education: University of Southern California (BA, JD)
- Profession: Attorney, judge, politician

Frederick Lee Hall (July 24, 1916 – March 18, 1970) was an American lawyer, judge, and politician who served as the 31st lieutenant governor of Kansas from 1951 to 1955 and 33rd governor of Kansas from 1955 until 1957 and a justice of the Kansas Supreme Court from 1957 to 1958. He was a member of the Republican Party.

== Biography ==
Hall was born in Dodge City and graduated from Dodge City High School where his participation on the debate team and his academic achievements earned him a scholarship to the University of Southern California. While attending U.S.C., he was a member of the International Debating Team, finished his B.A. degree in 1938, stayed on and earned his J.D. degree. He married Leadell Schneider and they had one child.

== Career ==
During World War II, Hall enlisted and was rejected when he failed to pass his physical. From 1942 to 1944, he served as an assistant director of the Combined Production and Resources Board, coordinating production planning with Britain and Canada, and based in Washington.

Hall established his law practice in Topeka and Dodge City and served as the Ford County attorney from 1947 to 1949. Elected Lieutenant Governor of Kansas, he served from 1951 to 1955.

Elected in 1954, Hall was sworn into the governorship on January 10, 1955. During his tenure, the director of the state purchasing agency was fired, a high school aid law was authorized, a water resource commission was organized, and a "right to work" bill was vetoed. Hall saw right-to-work legislation as a way to pit people against each other, and believed that the Republican Party shouldn't be an anti-labor party.

Hall resigned to become a justice of Kansas Supreme Court in 1957 after being defeated in the primary for re-election to office, in what is known as the "triple-play of 1956". Warren Shaw defeated Hall in the Republican primary for governor, and Shaw lost the subsequent Gubernatorial general election to Democrat George Docking. Sitting Chief Justice William A. Smith – a strong supporter of Hall – was seriously ill and contemplating a retirement from his position as Chief Justice; however, he was concerned that if he retired after Docking took office in January 1957, Docking would appoint a Democrat as chief justice. Smith, Hall, and Lieutenant Governor John McCuish devised a plan to prevent this from happening. Chief Justice Smith resigned effective January 3, 1957. Smith's resignation was quickly followed by Governor Hall's resignation also effective on January 3, 1957. As a result of Hall's resignation, Lieutenant Governor McCuish was sworn in as Kansas Governor. On the same day Walter G. Thiele became Chief Justice and Hall replaced Thiele as a justice of the Kansas Supreme Court. Thiele left the court the same day Docking became governor and Jay S. Parker replaced Thiele as chief justice.

Hall served on the Supreme Court bench until April 7, 1958, when he resigned to again run for the governorship where he lost the primary. Defeated in his bid, he retired from politics and moved to California where he became an executive in the management control of the Aerojet General Corporation.

Hall served as the president of the California Republican Assembly He was elected to the position at the organization's 1962 convention. Hall, who had found evidence of antisemitic and segregationist attitudes from John Birch Society members in the California Republican Assembly, described the Society's ideology as totalitarian and the closest thing to a fascist party in America.

In 1964, he ran for the Republican nomination for the 1964 United States Senate election in California, losing to George Murphy, a retired Hollywood star.

He returned later to Dodge City and resumed his law practice.

== Death and legacy ==
He was a member of the Methodist Church and a member of Phi Kappa Tau fraternity and elected to a term on the Phi Kappa Tau National Council in 1956. Hall died at Shawnee and is interred at Maple Grove Cemetery in Dodge City.

Party political offices
Preceded by Frank L. Hagaman	Republican nominee for Lieutenant Governor of Kansas; 1950, 1952	Succeeded by John McCuish
Preceded by Edward F. Arn	Republican nominee for Governor of Kansas; 1954	Succeeded by Warren W. Shaw
Political offices
Preceded by Frank L. Hagaman	Lieutenant Governor of Kansas; 1951–1955	Succeeded by John McCuish
Preceded by Edward F. Arn	Governor of Kansas; 1955–1957	Succeeded by John McCuish
