= Payne Ratner =

American politician

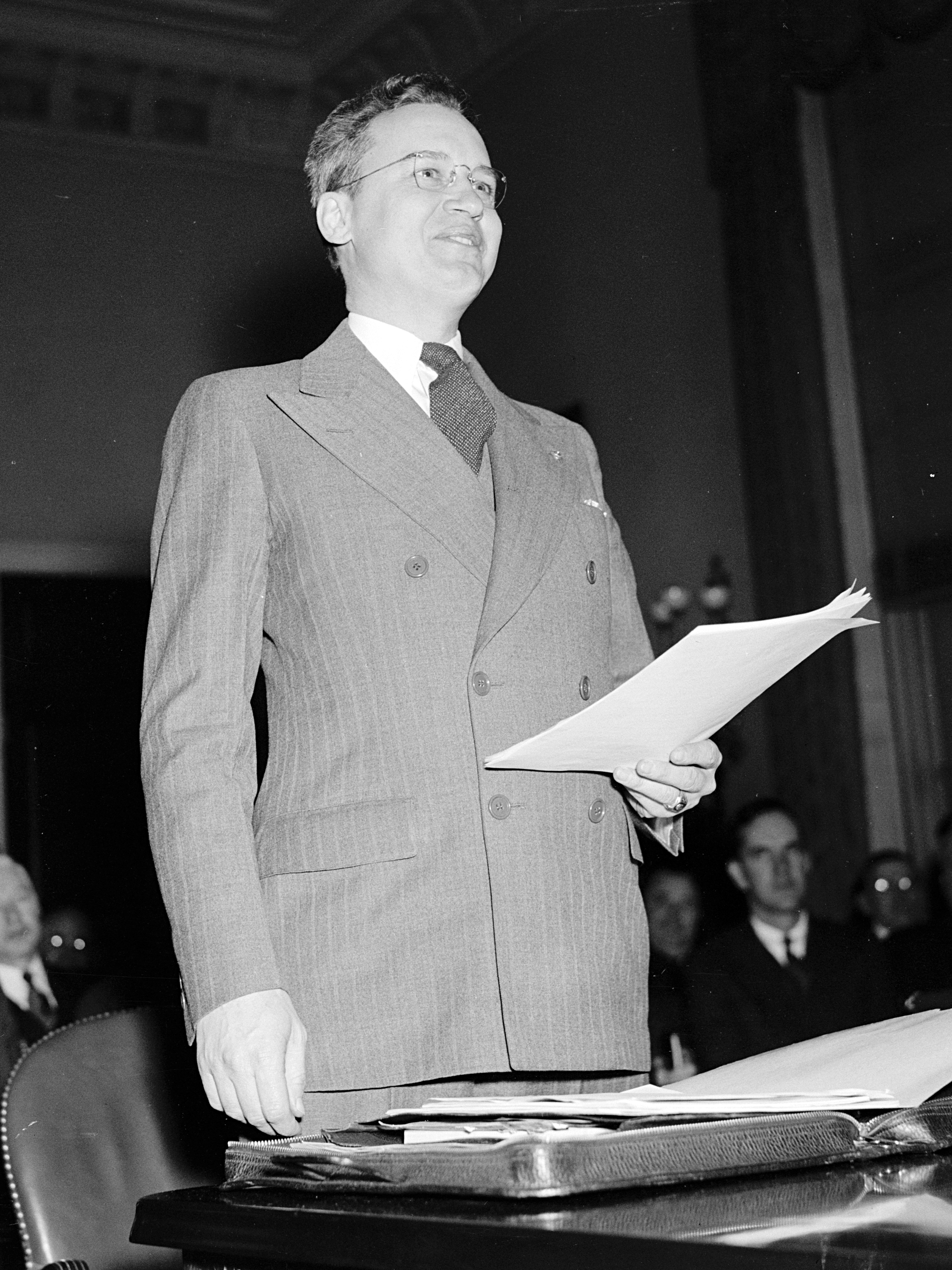

28th Governor of Kansas
- In office January 9, 1939 – January 11, 1943
- Lieutenant: Carl E. Friend
- Preceded by: Walter A. Huxman
- Succeeded by: Andrew F. Schoeppel

Member of the Kansas Senate
- In office 1929; 1937–1939

Personal details
- Born: October 3, 1896 Casey, Illinois, U.S.
- Died: December 27, 1974 (aged 78) Wichita, Kansas, U.S.
- Party: Republican
- Spouse: Cliffe Dodd
- Children: Jurie, Teno, Darb
- Education: Washington University in St. Louis (J.D.)
- Profession: attorney, politician

Payne Harry Ratner (October 3, 1896 – December 27, 1974) was an American lawyer serving as the 28th governor of Kansas from 1939 to 1943.

== Biography ==
Born in Casey, Illinois, Ratner graduated from Blackwell High School in Oklahoma. During World War I he served as an ensign in the U.S. Navy. He earned a Juris Doctor degree at Washington University in St. Louis in 1920. He married Cliffe Dodd on August 21, 1920 and they had three children, Jurie, Teno, and Darb.

== Career ==
Ratner practiced law in Sibley, Iowa, and then in Parsons, Kansas. In Parsons, he was the Labette County Attorney from 1923 to 1927. He was elected as a Republican to the Kansas Senate in 1929 and also served as state senator from 1937 to 1939.

Winning the 1938 Republican gubernatorial nomination and the election, Ratner was sworn in as Governor of Kansas on January 9, 1939. He was reelected in 1940. During his tenure, a department of labor was established, a department of revenue and taxation was organized, the highway commission was given authority over the vehicle department, a teacher's pension plan was implemented, a small permanent building fund for schools was authorized, and the state fire marshal's office, the hotel commission, and the inspector of restaurants were re-established. He left office on January 11, 1943, and retired from politics. In 1962 Ratner was indicted on unethical legal activities; the case was dismissed; and he was cleared of all charges.

In 1953 then Teamsters Vice President Jimmy Hoffa was facing pressure from a Senate subcommittee investigation. On Hoffa's behalf Barney Baker and Richard Kavner approached Ratner to intercede with Chairman Wint Smith. Ratner successfully convinced Smith to ease off investigating Hoffa.

== Antisemitic campaign ==
Although he was a deacon in the Disciples of Christ church, because his father was Jewish Ratner was subjected to a vicious antisemitic campaign during the 1938 gubernatorial election. The Marysville Advocate-Democrat called him "a tricky little Jew with just enough Aryan blood in his veins to camouflage his racial background and make him a welcome visitor in most any kind of respectable company. His father is a full-blooded Israelite who talks equally well with either hand." His opponent and leading Democratic officials condemned the slurs.

== Death ==
Ratner died in 1974 in Wichita, Kansas.

Party political offices
| Preceded by Will G. West | Republican nominee for Governor of Kansas; 1938, 1940 | Succeeded by Andrew Frank Schoeppel |
Political offices
| Preceded by Walter A. Huxman | Governor of Kansas; 1939–1943 | Succeeded by Andrew F. Schoeppel |
