= Warren W. Shaw =

American politician

Warren W. Shaw (January 20, 1908 – September 28, 1992) was an American judge, a member of U.S. General Dwight D. Eisenhower's staff during World War II, a representative in the Kansas House of Representatives and the 1956 Republican nominee for Kansas governor.

== Education ==
Shaw went to Central Park grade school in Topeka. He then attended Topeka High School where he was graduated near the top of his class. He was also class president. He excelled in math and science, making straight A's. He was on the first Topeka High Football team in 1924. He also played in 1925, and in 1926 he played center and was captain of the all-state team. He also met the girl he would later marry, Charlotte Mullinix.

Shaw graduated from Topeka High School in 1926 and went on to earn a law degree from Washburn University in 1931. During his time as a student at Washburn, he was captain of the 1929 and 1930 Washburn football teams under coach Ernest Bearg. In 1930 Washburn won the championship in the Central Kansas Conference. He was the all-state center and all-conference center in 1930 and captain of the all-conference team. He was a member of the Kansas Beta chapter of Phi Delta Theta fraternity, was President his senior year, and was also inducted into the school's prestigious Sagamore Society.

In his first two years at Washburn he took courses in pre-med, but during the second year, at the suggestion of friends in law school, he enrolled in a class in "contracts." He liked it. This was the beginning of a change of mind for Shaw. He had always intended to be a doctor, like his father. As one of six children in the Shaw family, he had to help put himself through college. He had a paper route that took him past the State Capitol building. The huge building loomed over him, a reminder of the vast importance of our government. It was then that he decided to pursue law school. He went home and told his father, Dr. Shaw that he wanted to be a lawyer instead of a doctor. It was a good choice. His successful Topeka practice would span the next 60+ years. He graduated in 1931 with his LL.B. degree and started practicing law shortly after.

== Military and legal work ==
Shaw started practicing law in the office of Allen Meyers, Topeka attorney. He was with Meyers until the fall of 1935, when he was appointed an Assistant Commissioner of Insurance. This was the depression era and times were tough. For two and a half years, Shaw gained experience in insurance and legal issues. At the time of the United States’ entry into World War II, Shaw was a judge of the Topeka Municipal Court. He left the bench in 1942 to enter the army. After a short time in North Africa, he was assigned to the London base command. Then, when SHAEF was set up (Supreme Headquarters, Allied Expeditionary Forces) Shaw was assigned as Staff Judge Advocate for this top level group headed by General Ike Eisenhower. "I saw a lot of Ike--he was always in and out of headquarters, but I was away down the line--just a major. He was my hero then." Shaw had clear memories of the many bombings on the headquarters at Bushey park, 20 miles west of London. Their headquarters was later moved to Southampton. On June 6, 1944, when the invasion began, he was a witness to sights he would never forget. "I can see it yet, the way those planes went over us in solid layers. It was just a continuous wave of roar, roar, roar." After the Normandy beaches were cleared, Shaw's unit moved into the Cherbourg peninsula behind the advancing forces to Versailles, and to Rheims at the time of the signing of the surrender. Then, they were moved to Frankfurt, Germany. As a legal officer, his military practice ranged from courts-martial to changing wills and prosecuting black market offenders. On May 24, 1945, Shaw received the Bronze Star Medal for his "untiring efforts, efficiency, ingenuity and resourcefulness", aiding in the "accomplishment of the mission of Headquarters Command, Supreme Headquarters, Allied Expeditionary Forces." He served in the European theater for 33 months as a staff judge advocate in the headquarters of fellow Kansan, General Eisenhower. He was discharged January 14, 1946, as a lieutenant colonel and resumed practice with his Topeka law firm.

"In Football or Politics He Gives With the Utmost", The Kansas City Star, Section D. Page 1, August 19, 1956.

== Political life ==
After World War II, Shaw served two terms as county attorney of Shawnee County before being elected to the Kansas House of Representatives in 1951. Shaw would go on to serve three terms representing Topeka, Kansas. In 1952, Shaw was a delegate to the Republican National Convention where Dwight Eisenhower was nominated for president.

In 1956, Shaw challenged fellow Republican Governor Fred Hall in the primary. Time magazine in August 1956 assessed the situation this way:

Stunned by Hall's ax-wielding and pro-labor actions, they assessed the situation silently, then began moving Kansas and earth to throw the upstart out. Hall's right-to-work veto drew the wrath of the powerful Kansas City Star; his purge of old friends in the State Civil Service Board brought suspicious frowns; his meddling and muddling in legislative affairs ("I am the governor") stirred deep resentment. When Hall called recalcitrant legislators "s.o.b.s" to their faces during a bitter legislative rhubarb early this year, the insulted lawmakers formed an "S.O.B. Club" to campaign against him. Kansas did a belly laugh, and thin-skinned Fred Hall was the victim.

Shaw won the 1956 Republican nomination but lost in the general election to Democrat George Docking.

Hall's defeat in the primary set in motion the so-called "triple play of 1956". Kansas Supreme Court Chief Justice Bill Smith, a strong supporter of Hall, was seriously ill and contemplating retirement. Smith was concerned that if he retired after Docking took office in January 1957, Docking would appoint a Democrat as Chief Justice. Smith and Hall devised a scheme to prevent this from happening. Chief Justice Smith resigned on December 31, 1956. Smith's resignation was quickly followed by Governor Hall's resignation on January 3, 1957. As a result of Hall's resignation, Lieutenant Governor McCuish was sworn in as Kansas Governor. The only official act of McCuish's 11-day tenure as governor was to appoint Hall as chief justice of the Kansas Supreme Court.

Shaw had no role in this affair but these events did help usher in a merit system for selecting judges in Kansas.

== Post-political activities ==
Shaw returned to practicing law with one of his former fraternity brothers, Wendell L. Garlinghouse. Garlinghouse had previously been an assistant attorney general in Kansas. In 1958-1959, he was president of the Topeka Bar Association. In the mid-1970s, Shaw was chairman of the state's American Bicentennial Commission.

== Honors and memberships ==
In 1948, the Topeka Phi Delta Theta Alumni Association named Shaw its "Phi of the Year." He was inducted into the Washburn Athletics Hall of Fame with the class of 1970-71. In 1980, Washburn University honored Shaw with its distinguished alumnus award. Shaw was inducted into the Hall of Fame of Topeka High School with the class of 1990-91. In 1995, the Topeka Bar Association honored Shaw by naming its most prestigious award for service to the legal profession in his honor.

During his lifetime, Shaw was a member of the American Legion, the Veterans of Foreign Wars, the Masonic Lodge, the Arab Shrine of Topeka and a past president of the Topeka Lions Club.

Party political offices
Preceded by Fred Hall	Republican nominee for Governor of Kansas; 1956	Succeeded by Clyde M. Reed Jr.
