= 1944 Kansas gubernatorial election =

- November 7, 1944
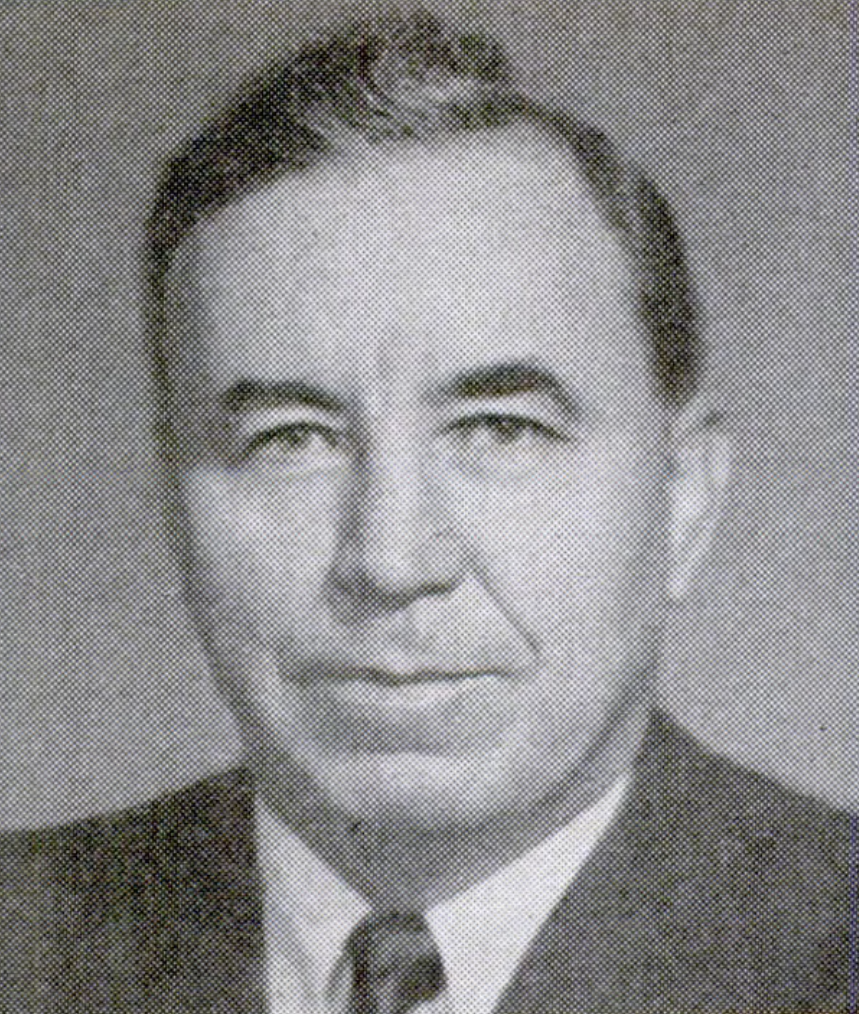

Nominee	Andrew Frank Schoeppel	Robert S. Lemon
Party	Republican	Democratic
Popular vote	463,110	231,410
Percentage	65.73%	32.84%
- County results Schoeppel: 50–60% 60–70% 70–80% 80–90%
Governor before election
Andrew Frank Schoeppel
Republican
Elected Governor
Andrew Frank Schoeppel
Republican

The 1944 Kansas gubernatorial election was held on November 7, 1944. Incumbent Republican Andrew Frank Schoeppel defeated Democratic nominee Robert S. Lemon with 65.73% of the vote.

== General election ==
=== Candidates ===
Major party candidates

- Andrew Frank Schoeppel, Republican
- Robert S. Lemon, Democratic

Other candidates

- David C. White, Prohibition
- W. W. Tamplin, Socialist

=== Results ===
1944 Kansas gubernatorial election
Party	Candidate	Votes	%	±%
Republican	Andrew Frank Schoeppel (incumbent)	463,110	65.73%	
Democratic	Robert S. Lemon	231,410	32.84%	
Prohibition	David C. White	7,794	1.11%	
Socialist	W. W. Tamplin	2,283	0.32%	
Majority		231,700		
Turnout				
Republican hold		Swing		
