= Walter A. Huxman =

American judge (1887–1972)

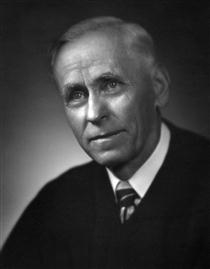

Senior Judge of the United States Court of Appeals for the Tenth Circuit
- In office April 1, 1957 – June 25, 1972

Judge of the United States Court of Appeals for the Tenth Circuit
- In office May 23, 1939 – April 1, 1957
- Appointed by: Franklin D. Roosevelt
- Preceded by: Robert L. Williams
- Succeeded by: Jean Sala Breitenstein

27th Governor of Kansas
- In office January 11, 1937 – January 9, 1939
- Lieutenant: William M. Lindsay
- Preceded by: Alf Landon
- Succeeded by: Payne Ratner

Personal details
- Born: Walter Augustus Huxman; February 16, 1887 Reno County, Kansas, U.S.
- Died: June 25, 1972 (aged 85) Topeka, Kansas, U.S.
- Party: Democratic
- Education: University of Kansas (LLB)

Walter Augustus Huxman (February 16, 1887 – June 25, 1972) was an American attorney, politician, and jurist who served as the 27th governor of Kansas and a United States circuit judge of the United States Court of Appeals for the Tenth Circuit.

== Early life and education ==
Huxman was born in Pretty Prairie, Kansas, and grew up on the family farm attending the local schools. He became a school teacher and from 1907 to 1909 he was principal of the Castleton Grade school and in 1910, principal of the Pretty Prairie Grade School. He attended Kansas State Normal School (now Emporia State University Teachers College) for two years and the University of Kansas School of Law where he received a Bachelor of Laws in 1914.

== Career ==
When he was admitted to the Kansas Bar Association, Huxman formed a partnership with Charles S. Fulton in Hutchinson, Kansas. As well as being in private practice from 1919 to 1937, he was an assistant county attorney of Kansas from 1915 to 1919, a city attorney from 1919 to 1921, and a member of the Kansas State Tax Commission from 1931 to 1932. An accomplished keynote speaker and chairman at the 1936 Democratic State Convention, Huxman was drafted as gubernatorial candidate.

=== Governor of Kansas ===
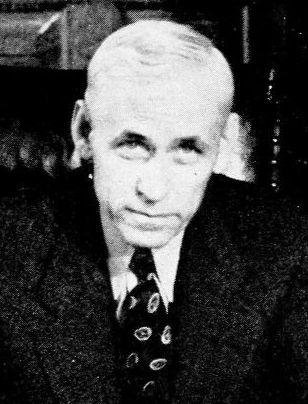
Huxman as governor.

He won the 1936 Kansas gubernatorial election and was sworn in as the governor of Kansas on January 11, 1937. Huxman's election as governor marked a reflection on his Republican predecessor, Alf Landon, who did not seek reelection as governor as he was instead the 1936 Republican presidential nominee.

Landon had failed to carry Kansas in the presidential race which would indicate that Huxman would have defeated Landon had Landon ran for re-election as governor.

During Huxman's tenure as governor, World War I soldier bonuses were paid, unemployment compensations benefits were approved, and driver's license regulations were amended. Huxman ran for re-election in 1938 but was defeated by Republican Payne Ratner.

=== Federal judicial service ===
Huxman was nominated by President Franklin D. Roosevelt on April 24, 1939, to a seat on the United States Court of Appeals for the Tenth Circuit vacated by Judge Robert L. Williams. He was confirmed by the United States Senate on May 17, 1939, and received his commission on May 23, 1939. He assumed senior status on April 1, 1957. His service terminated on June 25, 1972, due to his death. He was interred at Penwell-Gabel Cemetery and Mausoleum in Topeka, Shawnee County, Kansas.

Huxman was a member of the three-judge federal trial court in Brown v. Board of Education, and authored the court's opinion. Despite his personal objections to the ruling in Plessy, he abided by that precedent, based on the premise that the right to overrule the Supreme Court is reserved to the Supreme Court itself.

== Personal life ==
On January 21, 1915, he married Eula E. Biggs and they had one daughter, Ruth.

Party political offices
Preceded by Omar B. Ketchum	Democratic nominee for Governor of Kansas; 1936, 1938	Succeeded by William H. Burke
Political offices
Preceded by Alf Landon	Governor of Kansas; 1937–1939	Succeeded by Payne Ratner
Legal offices
Preceded by Robert L. Williams	Judge of the United States Court of Appeals for the Tenth Circuit; 1939–1957	Succeeded by Jean Sala Breitenstein
