= 1940 Kansas gubernatorial election =

- November 5, 1940
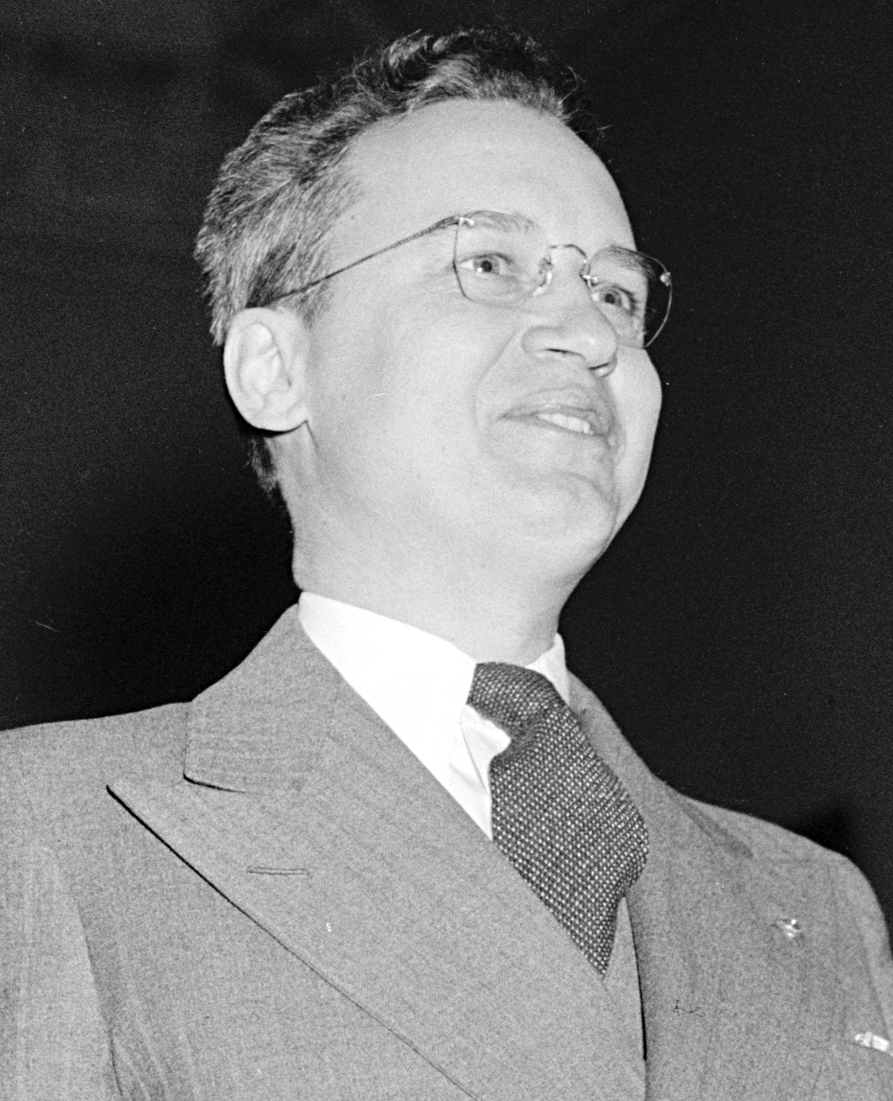

Nominee	Payne Ratner	William H. Burke
Party	Republican	Democratic
Popular vote	425,928	425,498
Percentage	49.63%	49.58%
- County results Ratner: 40–50% 50–60% 60–70% Burke: 40–50% 50–60% 60–70%
Governor before election
Payne Ratner
Republican
Elected Governor
Payne Ratner
Republican

The 1940 Kansas gubernatorial election was held on November 5, 1940. Incumbent Republican Payne Ratner defeated Democratic nominee William H. Burke with 49.63% of the vote.

== General election ==
=== Candidates ===
Major party candidates

- Payne Ratner, Republican
- William H. Burke, Democratic

Other candidates

- David C. White, Prohibition
- Ida A. Beloof, Socialist

=== Results ===
1940 Kansas gubernatorial election
Party	Candidate	Votes	%	±%
Republican	Payne Ratner (incumbent)	425,928	49.63%	
Democratic	William H. Burke	425,498	49.58%	
Prohibition	David C. White	5,227	0.61%	
Socialist	Ida A. Beloof	1,636	0.19%	
Majority		430		
Turnout				
Republican hold		Swing		
