= 1956 Kansas gubernatorial election =

- November 6, 1956
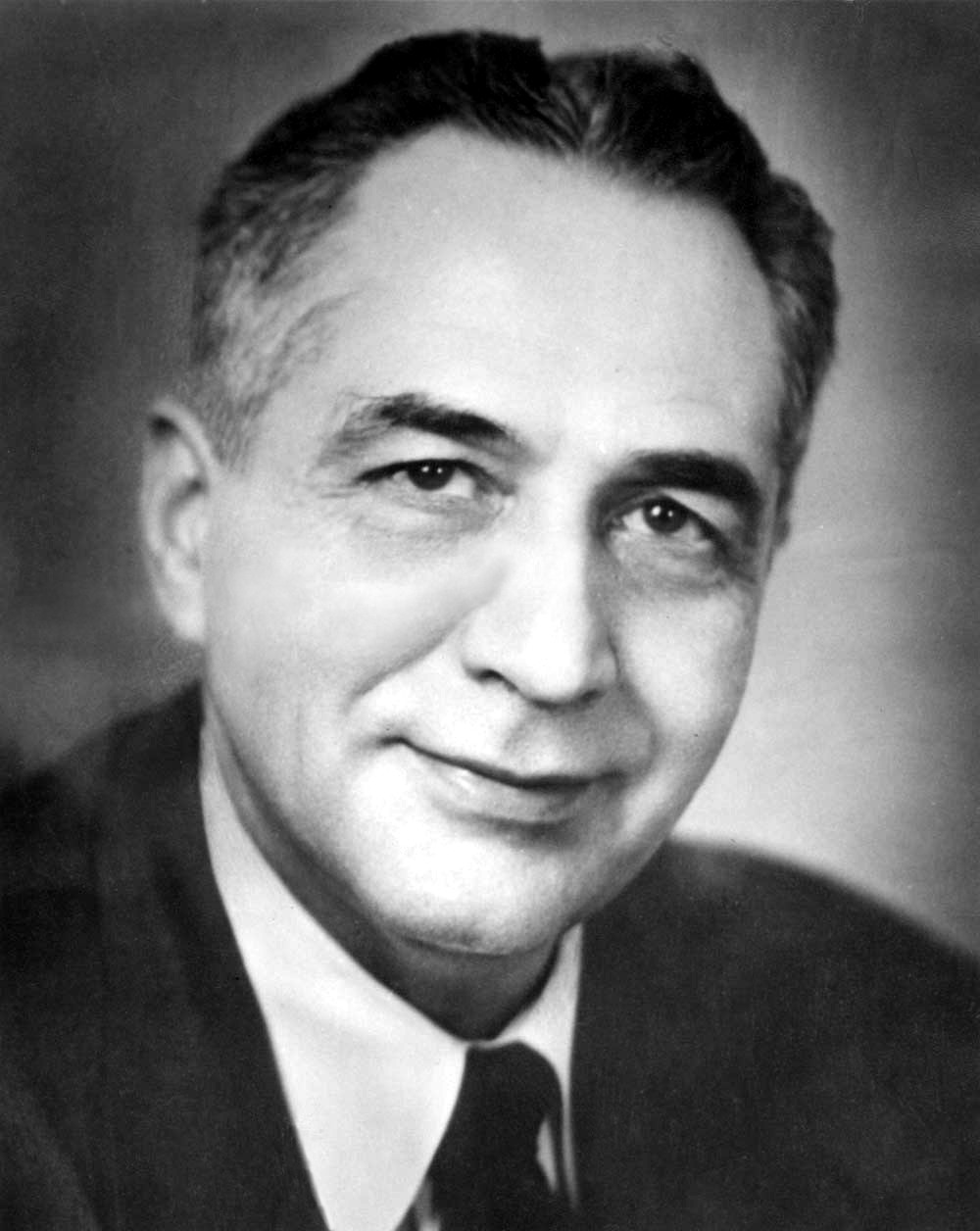

Nominee	George Docking	Warren W. Shaw
Party	Democratic	Republican
Popular vote	479,701	364,340
Percentage	55.46%	42.12%
- County results Docking: 40–50% 50–60% 60–70% Shaw: 40–50% 50–60% 60–70%
Governor before election
Fred Hall
Republican
Elected Governor
George Docking
Democratic

The 1956 Kansas gubernatorial election was held on November 6, 1956. Democratic nominee George Docking defeated Republican nominee Warren W. Shaw with 55.46% of the vote.

== Primary elections ==
Primary elections were held on August 7, 1956.

=== Democratic primary ===
==== Candidates ====
- George Docking, businessman
- Harry Hines Woodring, former governor and United States Secretary of War

==== Results ====
Democratic primary results
Party	Candidate	Votes	%
Democratic	George Docking	76,544	50.33
Democratic	Harry Hines Woodring	75,548	49.67
Total votes		152,092	100.00

=== Republican primary ===
==== Candidates ====
- Warren W. Shaw, state representative
- Fred Hall, incumbent governor
- Francis Holton
- John O. Stewart

==== Results ====
Republican primary results
Party	Candidate	Votes	%
Republican	Warren W. Shaw	156,476	52.66
Republican	Fred Hall (incumbent)	123,398	41.53
Republican	Francis Holton	10,682	3.60
Republican	John O. Stewart	6,594	2.22
Total votes		297,150	100.00

== General election ==
=== Candidates ===
Major party candidates

- George Docking, Democratic
- Warren W. Shaw, Republican

Other candidates

- Harry O. Lytle Jr., Prohibition

=== Results ===
1956 Kansas gubernatorial election
Party	Candidate	Votes	%	±%
Democratic	George Docking	479,701	55.46%	
Republican	Warren W. Shaw	364,340	42.12%	
Prohibition	Harry O. Lytle Jr.	20,894	2.42%	
Majority		115,361		
Turnout		864,935		
Democratic gain from Republican		Swing		
