= 1960 Kansas gubernatorial election =

- November 8, 1960
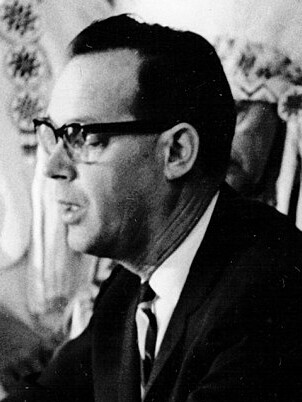

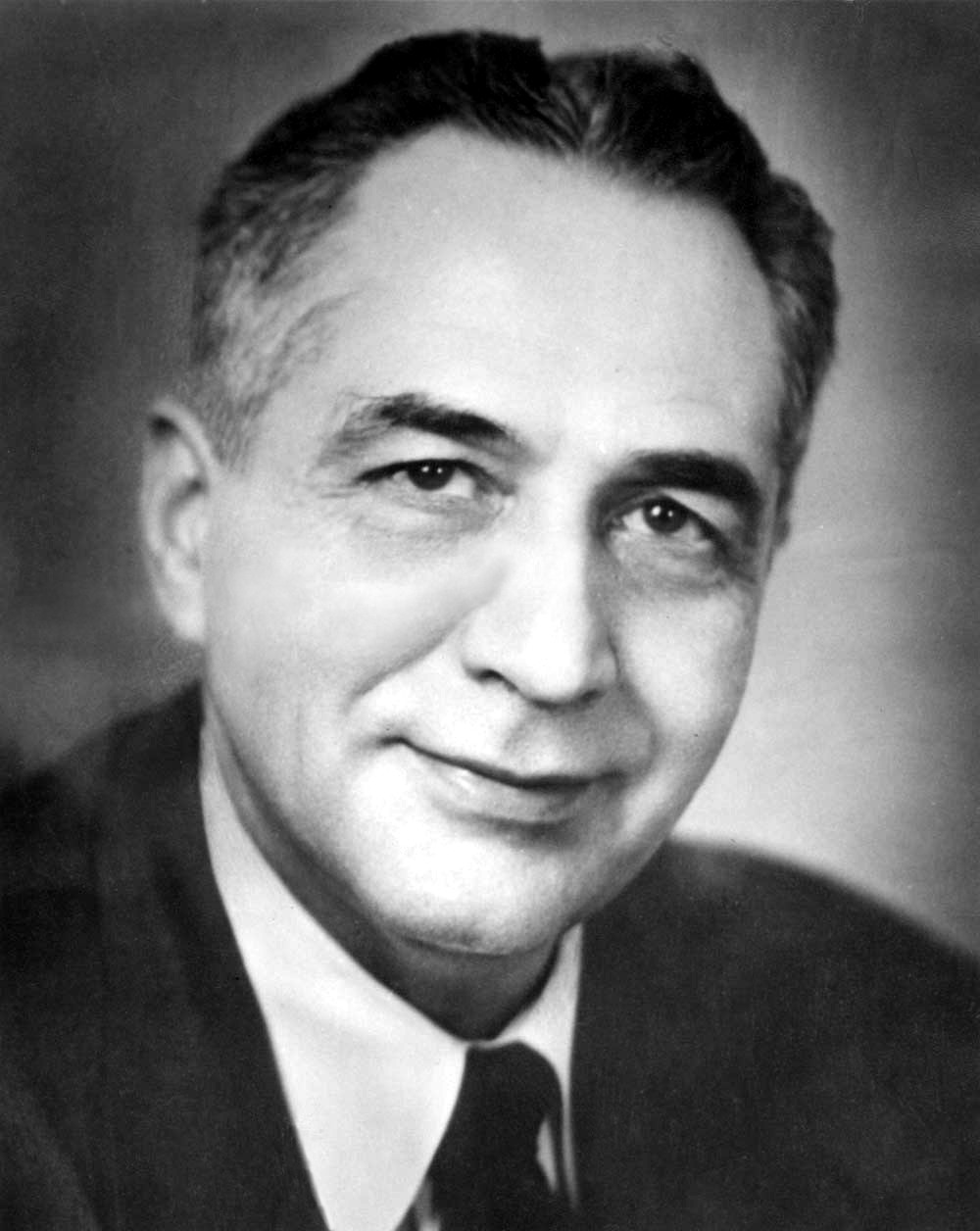
Nominee	John Anderson Jr.	George Docking
Party	Republican	Democratic
Popular vote	511,534	402,261
Percentage	55.45%	43.60%
- County results Anderson: 40–50% 50–60% 60–70% Docking: 50–60%
Governor before election
George Docking
Democratic
Elected Governor
John Anderson Jr.
Republican

The 1960 Kansas gubernatorial election was held on November 8, 1960. Republican nominee John Anderson Jr. defeated Democratic incumbent George Docking with 55.5% of the vote.

== Primary elections ==
Primary elections were held on August 2, 1960.

=== Republican primary ===
==== Candidates ====
- John Anderson Jr., Kansas Attorney General
- McDill "Huck" Boyd, Newspaper publisher
- W.H. "Bill" Addington, State Representative

==== Results ====
Republican primary results
Party	Candidate	Votes	%
Republican	John Anderson Jr.	128,081	48.71
Republican	McDill "Huck" Boyd	116,725	44.39
Republican	W.H. "Bill" Addington	18,169	6.91
Total votes		262,975	100.00

== General election ==
=== Candidates ===
Major party candidates

- John Anderson Jr., Republican
- George Docking, Democratic

Other candidates

- J. J. Steele, Prohibition

=== Results ===
1960 Kansas gubernatorial election
Party	Candidate	Votes	%	±%
Republican	John Anderson Jr.	511,534	55.45%	
Democratic	George Docking (incumbent)	402,261	43.60%	
Prohibition	J. J. Steele	8,727	0.95%	
Majority		109,273		
Turnout		922,522		
Republican gain from Democratic		Swing		
