= Joseph W. Henkle Sr. =

American politician

33rd Lieutenant Governor of Kansas
- In office January 14, 1957 – January 9, 1961
- Governor: George Docking
- Preceded by: John McCuish
- Succeeded by: Harold H. Chase

Personal details
- Born: August 29, 1906 Ponca City, Oklahoma, U.S.
- Died: January 25, 1983 (aged 76) Great Bend, Kansas, U.S.
- Party: Democratic

Joseph W. Henkle Sr. (August 29, 1906 – January 25, 1983) was an American politician. He was Lieutenant Governor of Kansas from 1957 to 1961.

Party political offices
Preceded by George Hart	Democratic nominee for Lieutenant Governor of Kansas; 1956, 1958	Succeeded by Jack Glaves
Preceded by Jack Glaves	Democratic nominee for Lieutenant Governor of Kansas; 1962	Succeeded by Keith Martin
Political offices
Preceded by John McCuish	Lieutenant Governor of Kansas; 1957 – 1961	Succeeded by Harold H. Chase
