= Harold H. Chase =

American politician

34th Lieutenant Governor of Kansas
- In office January 9, 1961 – January 11, 1965
- Governor: John Anderson, Jr.
- Preceded by: Joseph W. Henkle, Sr.
- Succeeded by: John Crutcher

2nd Chair of the National Lieutenant Governors Association
- In office 1963–1964
- Preceded by: Samuel Shapiro
- Succeeded by: Robert Evander McNair

Personal details
- Born: March 31, 1912 Springfield, Missouri, U.S.
- Died: October 24, 1976 (aged 64) Salina, Kansas, U.S.
- Party: Republican
- Occupation: lawyer

Harold H. Chase (March 31, 1912 – October 24, 1976) was an American politician. He was Lieutenant Governor of Kansas from 1961 to 1965. A lawyer, he was educated at Phillips University in Oklahoma, Washburn University, and Kansas Wesleyan University.

Party political offices
Preceded by Glenn D. Cogswell	Republican nominee for Lieutenant Governor of Kansas; 1960, 1962	Succeeded by John Crutcher
Political offices
Preceded by Joseph W. Henkle, Sr.	Lieutenant Governor of Kansas; 1961 – 1965	Succeeded by John Crutcher
