= 1954 Kansas gubernatorial election =

- November 2, 1954
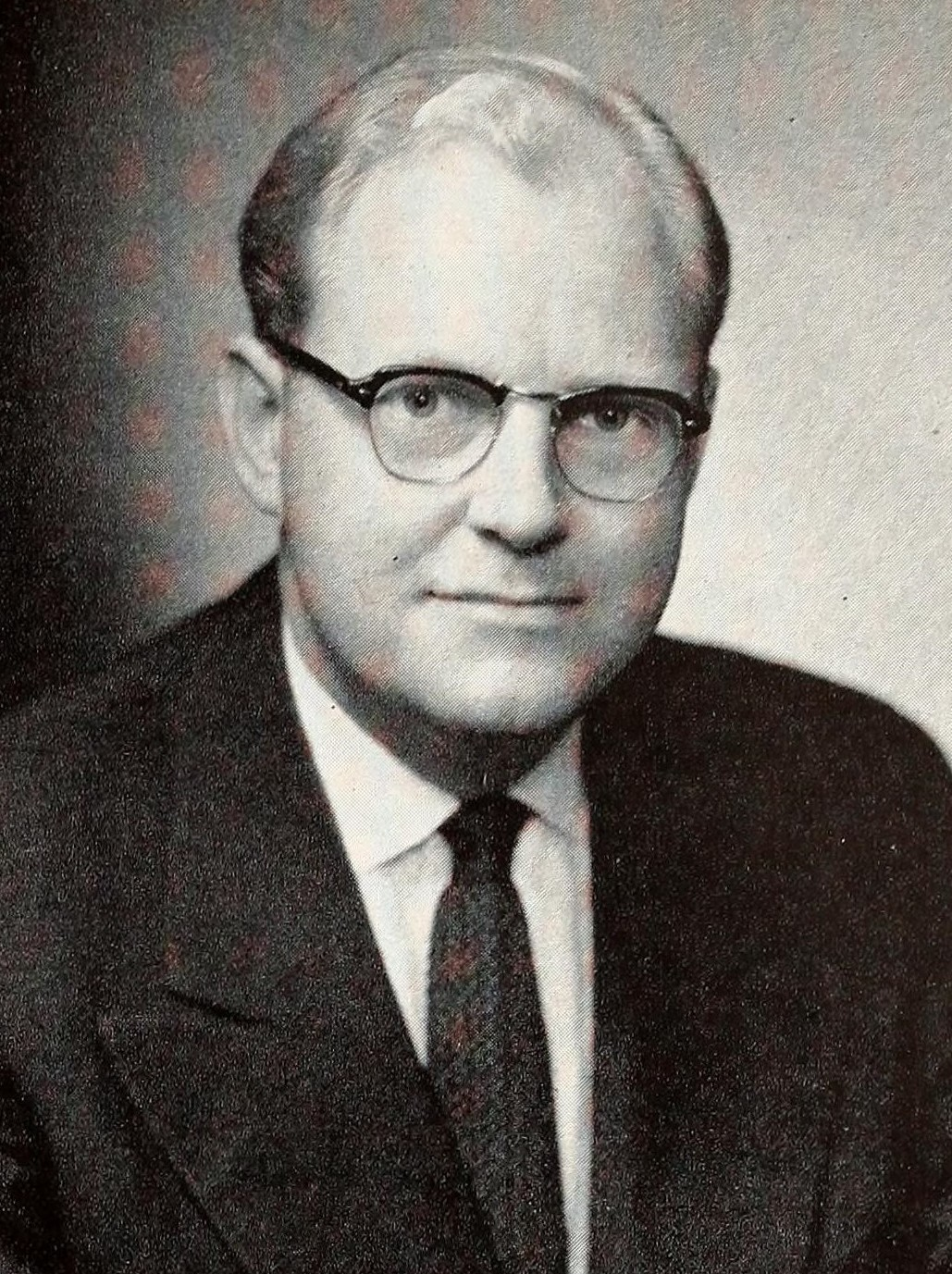

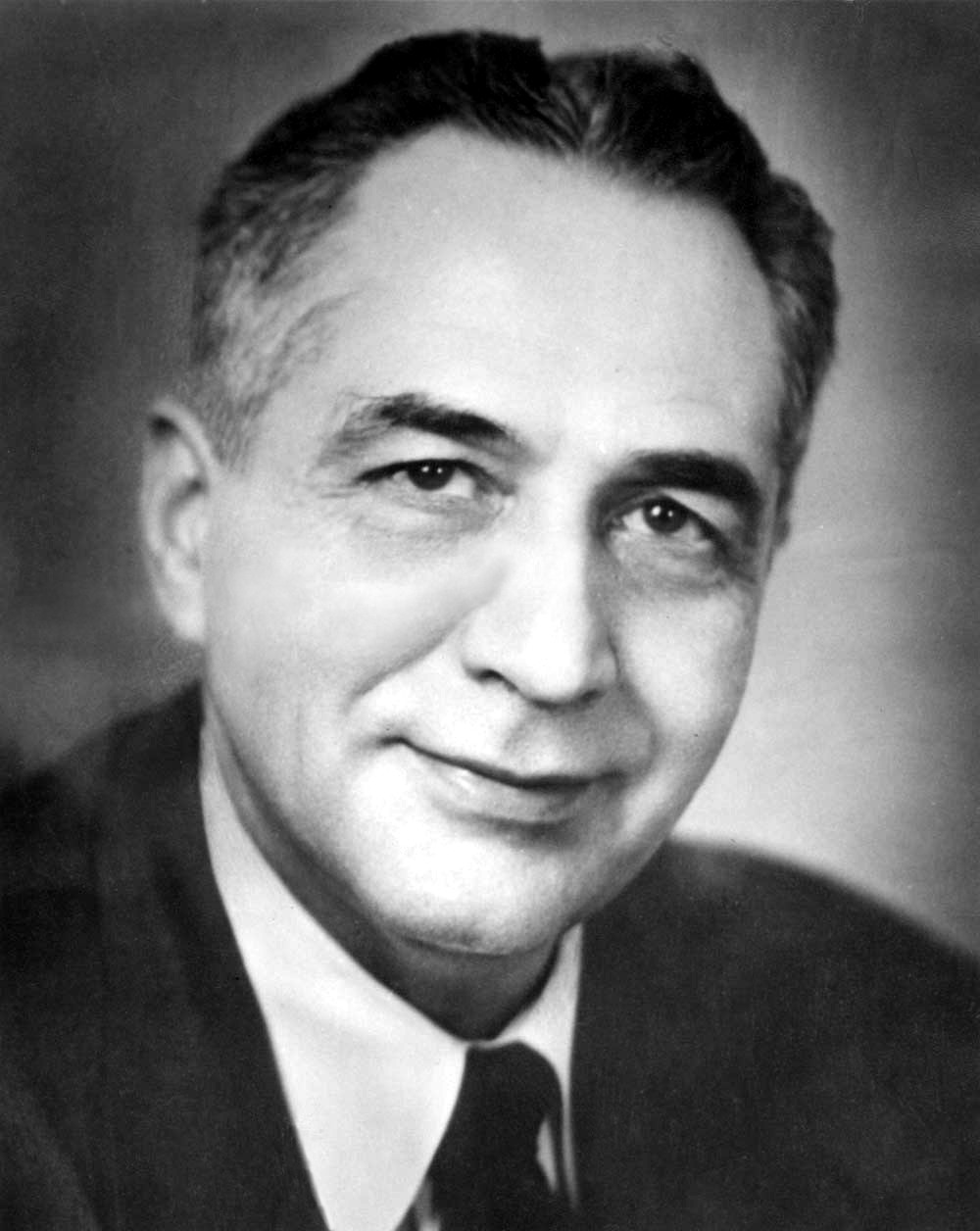
Nominee	Fred Hall	George Docking
Party	Republican	Democratic
Popular vote	329,868	286,218
Percentage	52.98%	45.97%
- County results Hall: 40–50% 50–60% 60–70% Docking: 40–50% 50–60% 60–70%
Governor before election
Edward F. Arn
Republican
Elected Governor
Fred Hall
Republican

The 1954 Kansas gubernatorial election was held on November 2, 1954. Republican nominee Fred Hall defeated Democratic nominee George Docking with 52.98% of the vote.

== Primary elections ==
Primary elections were held on August 3, 1954.

=== Democratic primary ===
==== Candidates ====
- George Docking, businessman
- William C. Salome

==== Results ====
Democratic primary results
Party	Candidate	Votes	%
Democratic	George Docking	54,351	56.72
Democratic	William C. Salome	41,478	43.28
Total votes		95,829	100.00

=== Republican primary ===
==== Candidates ====
- Fred Hall, incumbent Lieutenant Governor
- Henry George Templar, former United States Attorney for the District of Kansas
- Joe E. Rogers

==== Results ====
Republican primary results
Party	Candidate	Votes	%
Republican	Fred Hall	122,329	51.85
Republican	Henry George Templar	106,539	45.16
Republican	Joe E. Rogers	7,043	2.99
Total votes		235,911	100.00

== General election ==
=== Candidates ===
Major party candidates

- Fred Hall, Republican
- George Docking, Democratic

Other candidates

- Chester A. Roberts, Prohibition
- W. W. Tamplin, Socialist

=== Results ===
1954 Kansas gubernatorial election
Party	Candidate	Votes	%	±%
Republican	Fred Hall	329,868	52.98%	
Democratic	George Docking	286,218	45.97%	
Prohibition	Chester A. Roberts	5,531	0.89%	
Socialist	W. W. Tamplin	1,016	0.16%	
Majority		43,650		
Turnout		622,633		
Republican hold		Swing		
