= George Docking =

35th Governor of Kansas

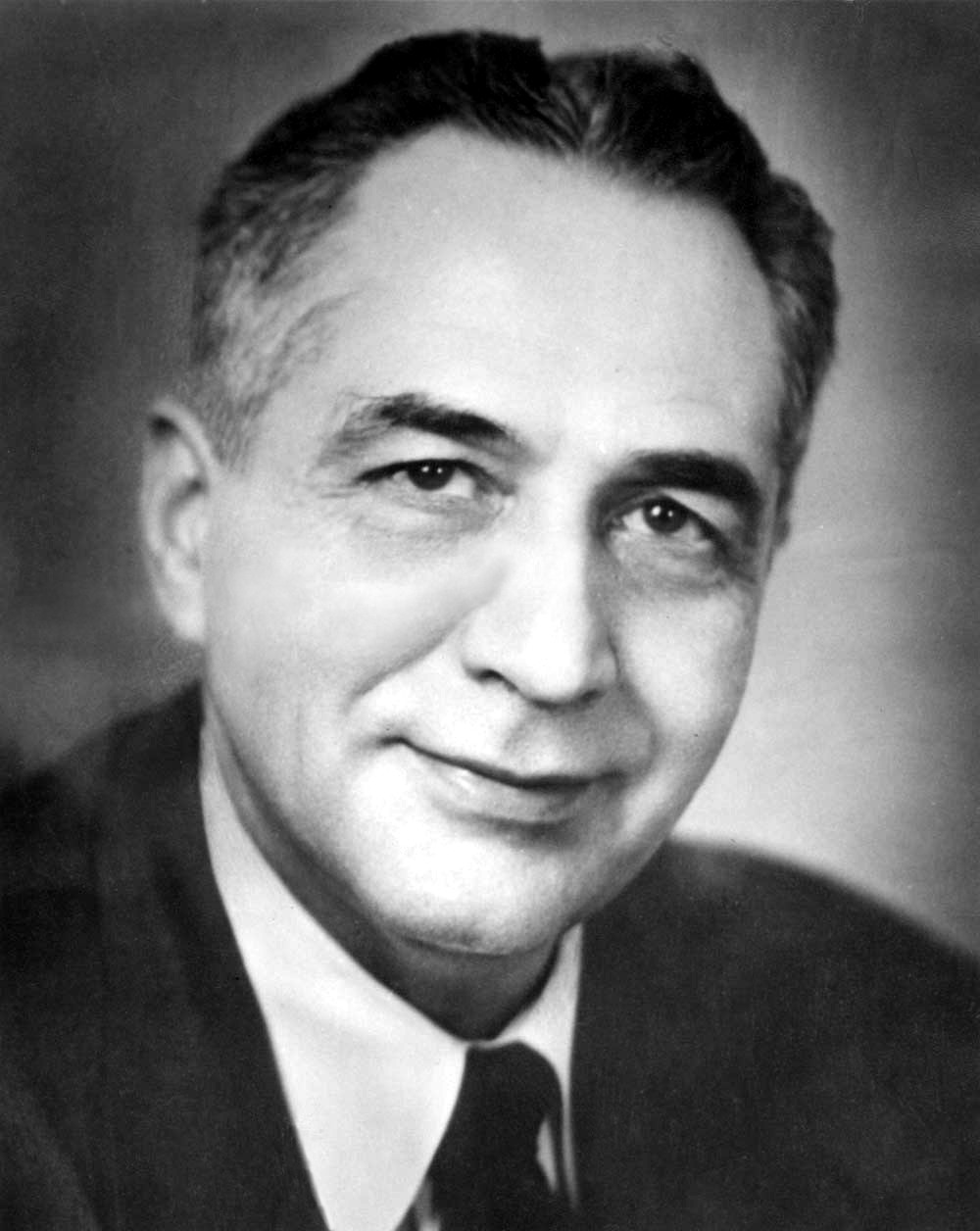

35th Governor of Kansas
- In office January 14, 1957 – January 9, 1961
- Lieutenant: Joseph W. Henkle Sr.
- Preceded by: John McCuish
- Succeeded by: John Anderson Jr.

Personal details
- Born: February 23, 1904 Clay Center, Kansas, U.S.
- Died: January 20, 1964 (aged 59) Kansas City, Kansas, U.S.
- Party: Democratic
- Spouse: Mary Virginia Blackwell
- Children: 2, including Robert
- Education: University of Kansas
- Profession: Bond salesman, banker, gas businessman

George Docking (February 23, 1904 – January 20, 1964) was an American businessman who served as the 35th governor of Kansas (1957–1961). He was a member of the Democratic Party.

== Biography ==
Born in Clay Center, Kansas, Docking was educated in the public schools of Lawrence, Kansas. He graduated from the University of Kansas in 1925. He married Mary Virginia Blackwell, and they had two children. Docking was a Presbyterian.

== Career ==
Docking changed party affiliations when Franklin D. Roosevelt was first nominated for president. In 1952, he became the fundraiser for the presidential campaign of Adlai Stevenson.

Docking was elected Governor of Kansas in 1956 and reelected in 1958, making him the first member of the Democratic Party to serve more than a single term as governor in Kansas. In the election of 1960 he lost to Republican candidate John Anderson Jr. perhaps in part because of his stance on the death penalty. He was known to say "I just don't like killing people." His tenure was marked by his battles with a Republican controlled legislature, and a three-year dispute with the University of Kansas Chancellor Franklin Murphy was settled, resulting in Murphy's resignation.

Docking was a delegate to the 1960 Democratic National Convention. In 1961, President John F. Kennedy appointed him Director of the Export-Import Bank in Washington, D.C. He served in that office until his death.

== Death and legacy ==
Docking died from emphysema in 1964 in a hospital in Kansas City, Kansas, and is interred at the Highland Park Cemetery in Kansas City. Docking's son Robert served four terms as Governor of Kansas, from 1967 to 1975, and his grandson Thomas served one term as Lieutenant Governor of Kansas, from 1983 to 1987. The Docking family remains one of the most prominent in Kansas politics. Docking was a champion amateur tennis player and a master bridge player.

Political offices
| Preceded by John McCuish | Governor of Kansas; 1957 - 1961 | Succeeded by John Anderson Jr. |
Party political offices
| Preceded by Charles Rooney | Democratic nominee for Governor of Kansas; 1954, 1956, 1958, 1960 | Succeeded by Dale E. Saffels |
