= 1922 Kansas gubernatorial election =

- November 7, 1922
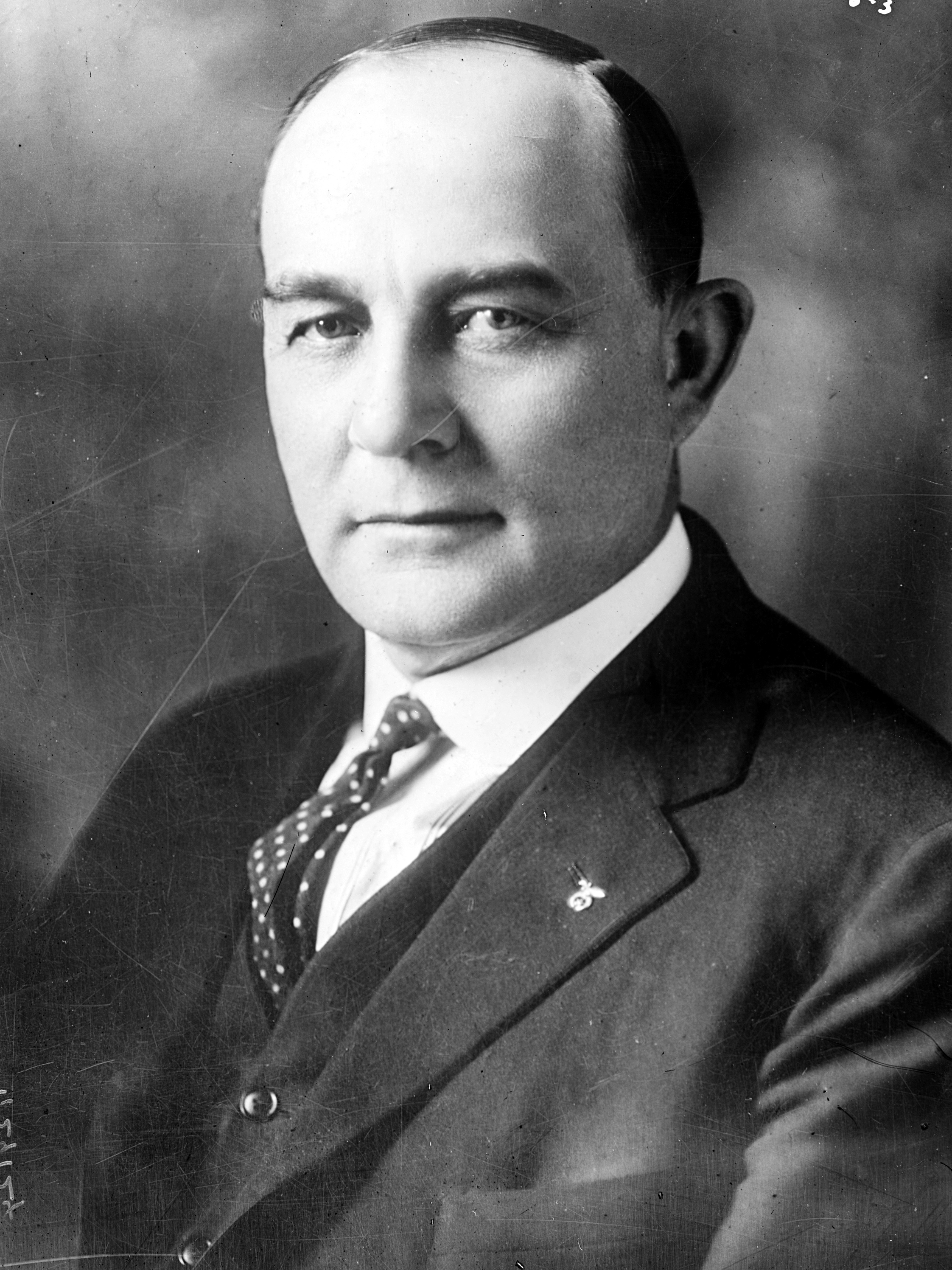

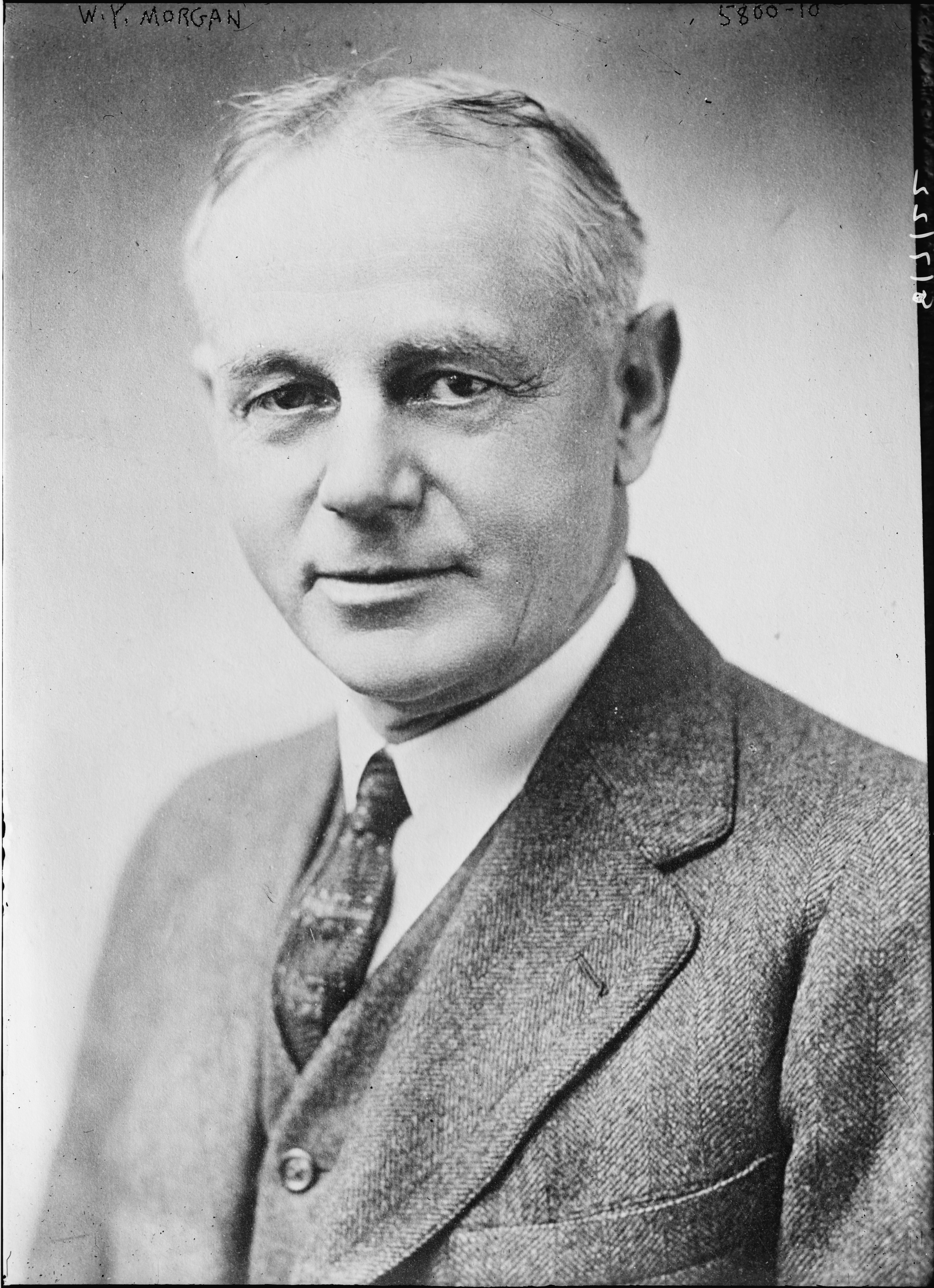
Nominee	Jonathan M. Davis	William Yoast Morgan
Party	Democratic	Republican
Popular vote	271,058	252,602
Percentage	50.87%	47.41%
- County results Davis: 40–50% 50–60% 60–70% Morgan: 40–50% 50–60% 60–70%
Governor before election
Henry Justin Allen
Republican
Elected Governor
Jonathan M. Davis
Democratic

The 1922 Kansas gubernatorial election was held on November 7, 1922. Democratic nominee Jonathan M. Davis defeated Republican nominee William Yoast Morgan with 50.87% of the vote.

== General election ==
=== Candidates ===
Major party candidates

- Jonathan M. Davis, Democratic
- William Yoast Morgan, Republican

Other candidates

- M. L. Phillips, Socialist

=== Results ===
1922 Kansas gubernatorial election
Party	Candidate	Votes	%	±%
Democratic	Jonathan M. Davis	271,058	50.87%	
Republican	William Yoast Morgan	252,602	47.41%	
Socialist	M. L. Phillips	9,138	1.72%	
Majority		18,456		
Turnout				
Democratic gain from Republican		Swing		
