= Senator Morgan =

Senator Morgan may refer to:

== Members of the Northern Irish Senate ==
- William James Morgan (1914–1999), Northern Irish Senator from 1969 to 1970

== Members of the United States Senate ==
- Edwin D. Morgan (1811–1883), U.S. Senator from New York from 1863 to 1869
- John Tyler Morgan (1824–1907), U.S. senator from Alabama from 1877 to 1907
- Robert Burren Morgan (1925–2016), U.S. Senator from North Carolina from 1975 to 1981

== United States state senate members ==
- B. F. Morgan (1858–1922), South Dakota State Senate
- Becky Morgan (politician) (born 1938), California State Senate
- George Morgan (New York) (1816–1879), New York State Senate
- James B. Morgan (1833–1892), Mississippi State Senate
- James G. Morgan (1885–1964), Missouri State Senate
- Jedediah Morgan (1774–1826), New York State Senate
- John T. Morgan (judge) (c. 1830–1910), Illinois State Senate
- Karen Morgan (born 1952), Utah State Senate
- Lewis H. Morgan (1818–1881), New York State Senate
- Lyman Morgan (1814–1896), Wisconsin State Senate
- Mike Morgan (politician) (born 1955), Oklahoma State Senate
- P. J. Morgan (born 1940), Nebraska State Senate
- William Albert Morgan (1841–1917), Kansas State Senate

== See also ==
- Morgan Morgans (1806–1889), Connecticut State Senate
