= William Yoast Morgan =

American newspaperman and politician (1866–1932)

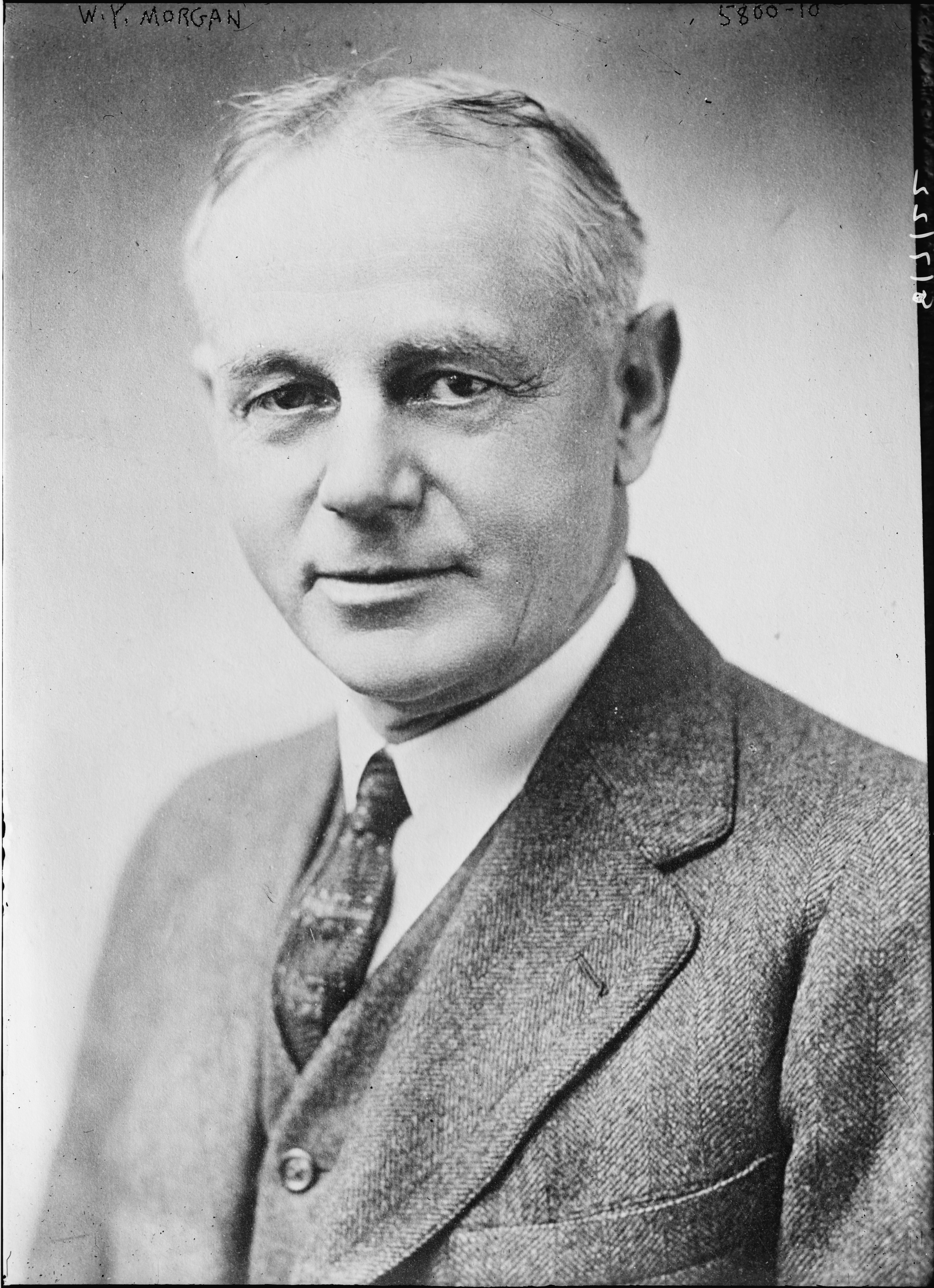
Morgan c. 1920–1925

William Yoast Morgan (April 6, 1866 – February 17, 1932) was an American newspaperman, author and politician who served as the 21st Lieutenant Governor of Kansas from 1915 to 1919 under Governor Arthur Capper. He was a member of the Republican Party.

== Family and early life ==
Morgan was born in Cincinnati, Ohio, where his grandfather James Morgan settled after emigrating from Ireland in 1847. Morgan's father William Albert Morgan (1841–1917) was apprenticed to a printer and then served in the Civil War. In 1871 he moved to Cottonwood Falls, Kansas and started the Chase County Leader newspaper, which he continued until retiring in 1903. He also served in both houses of the state legislature. Morgan's mother Wilhelmina (Yoast) Morgan (1843–1910) was active in civic organizations and politics, serving as Mayor of Cottonwood Falls in 1885. Morgan himself was educated in Cottonwood Falls and then at the state university in Lawrence, majoring in journalism.

Morgan married Colie Adair (1872–1958) in November 1890; they had one daughter, Claudia (d. 1958).

== Career ==
After working at the Lawrence Journal for two years, Morgan purchased and edited the Republican in Strong City. He sold that paper after four years and purchased the Emporia Daily Gazette; he operated that until selling it to William Allen White in 1895. He then organized a corporation to purchase and operate The Hutchinson News in Hutchinson, Kansas, where he remained until his death. As of 1912 it had the largest circulation of any newspaper in central Kansas. From 1899 to 1903 he was the state printer.

Morgan was active in the Republican Party; in 1903 he was elected to the Kansas House of Representatives, where he continued to serve until 1910. He was Lieutenant Governor of Kansas from 1915 to 1919, serving under Governor Arthur Capper. He was a delegate to the 1916 and 1920 Republican National Conventions, as well as the Republican candidate for Governor of Kansas in 1922. He lost the general election to Democrat Jonathan M. Davis.

Morgan had extensive business interests around Hutchinson, including the Hutchinson Printing Company. He served briefly as the president of the State Exchange Bank there. He served on the University of Kansas Board of Regents, as president of the Kansas Editorial Association, as state commander of the Sons of Veterans and the head of various charitable enterprises.

cover of A Jayhawker in Europe (1911)

From 1903 until 1905, Morgan served as Archon Councilor of his fraternity, Phi Gamma Delta. Letters Morgan wrote while travelling were compiled into four books: A Journey of a Jayhawker (1905), A Jayhawker in Europe (1911), The Near East (1913) and "Yurrup" As Is (1926).

Morgan Elementary School in Hutchinson is named in his honor.

Party political offices
| Preceded by Henry Justin Allen | Republican nominee for Governor of Kansas; 1922 | Succeeded by Benjamin S. Paulen |
Political offices
| Preceded by Sheffield Ingalls | Lieutenant Governor of Kansas; 1915–1919 | Succeeded by Charles S. Huffman |
