= Jonathan M. Davis =

American politician (1871–1943)

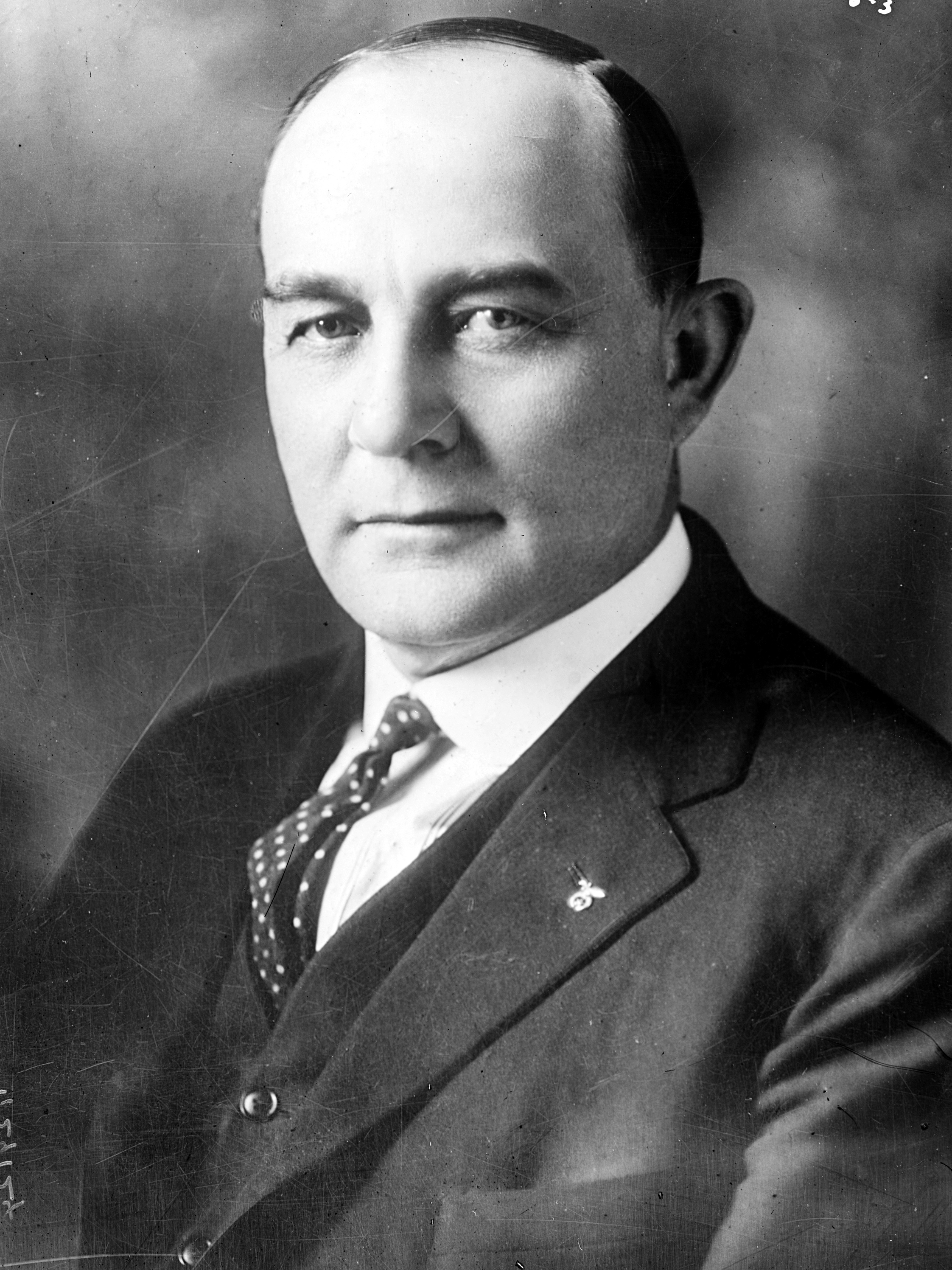

22nd Governor of Kansas
- In office January 8, 1923 – January 12, 1925
- Lieutenant: Benjamin S. Paulen
- Preceded by: Henry J. Allen
- Succeeded by: Benjamin S. Paulen

Member of the Kansas Senate
- In office 1915-1917

Member of the Kansas House of Representatives
- In office 1905-1913

Personal details
- Born: April 27, 1871 Bourbon County, Kansas, U.S.
- Died: June 27, 1943 (aged 72) Bourbon County, Kansas, U.S.
- Party: Democratic
- Spouse: Mary Purdom
- Profession: farmer, postmaster, politician

Jonathan McMillan Davis (April 27, 1871 – June 27, 1943) was an American politician and the 22nd governor of Kansas.

== Biography ==
Davis was born in Bronson, Kansas, to Jonathan McMillan and Eve (Holeman) Davis. His education was in the public schools and the University of Kansas and the University of Nebraska–Lincoln. He left college without graduating due to the death of his father. He married Mary "Mollie" Purdom on September 26, 1894, and they had four children. Mollie died in 1926 and he married Mary E. (Winston) Raymond on December 16, 1931.

== Career ==
Davis served in the Kansas House of Representatives from 1905 to 1913; and then in the Kansas State Senate from 1915 to 1917.

Davis won a narrow victory over Republican William Yoast Morgan in the 1922 Kansas gubernatorial election and was sworn into office on January 8, 1923. During his tenure, taxes were cut, prohibition and women's suffrage were endorsed, increased funding secured for veteran's pensions, banking procedures were limited, an improved road bill was authorized, utilities were controlled, and the chancellor of the University of Kansas was fired.

Davis was the Democratic candidate in the 1924 Kansas gubernatorial election but the independent candidacy of publisher William Allen White on an anti-Ku Klux Klan platform split the progressive vote and Republican Benjamin S. Paulen was elected by a plurality.

Davis was arrested the day after his term ended. He was indicted twice for bribery, tried twice and acquitted both times. His defense was led by Populist lawyers Alexander Miller Harvey and Frank Doster.

He was again the Democratic nominee in the 1926 Kansas gubernatorial election but lost in a landslide to the incumbent Paulen. In 1930 Davis was the Democratic nominee for US Senate opposing incumbent Republican Arthur Capper and suffered another landslide loss.

In 1936 Davis made another run for governor but lost the Democratic primary to Walter A. Huxman. He ran for governor as an independent in 1938 but received less than 2% of the vote.

== Death ==
Davis died on June 27, 1943, following a lengthy illness and several repeat visits to a Fort Scott hospital. He is interred at Bronson Cemetery in Bronson, Kansas.

Party political offices
Preceded by W. C. Lansdon	Democratic nominee for Governor of Kansas; 1920, 1922, 1924, 1926	Succeeded by Chauncey B. Little
Preceded by James Malone	Democratic nominee for U.S. Senator from Kansas (Class 2); 1930	Succeeded by Omar B. Ketchum
Preceded by I. S. Woodward	Democratic nominee for Lieutenant Governor of Kansas; 1950	Succeeded by James E. Fisher
Political offices
Preceded by Henry J. Allen	Governor of Kansas; 1923–1925	Succeeded by Ben S. Paulen
