= Charles Solomon =

Charles Solomon may refer to:

- Charles Solomon (racketeer) (1884–1933), known as King, American racketeer
- Charles Solomon (politician) (1889–1963), known as Charley, American socialist politician
- Charles J. Solomon (1906–1975), American bridge player
- Charles Solomon (animation historian), American animation critic and historian

== See also ==
- Charles Solomon Huffman (1865–1960), American politician
- Buddy Myer (Charles Solomon Myer, 1904–1974), American baseball player
