= 1930 United States Senate election in Kansas =

- November 4, 1930
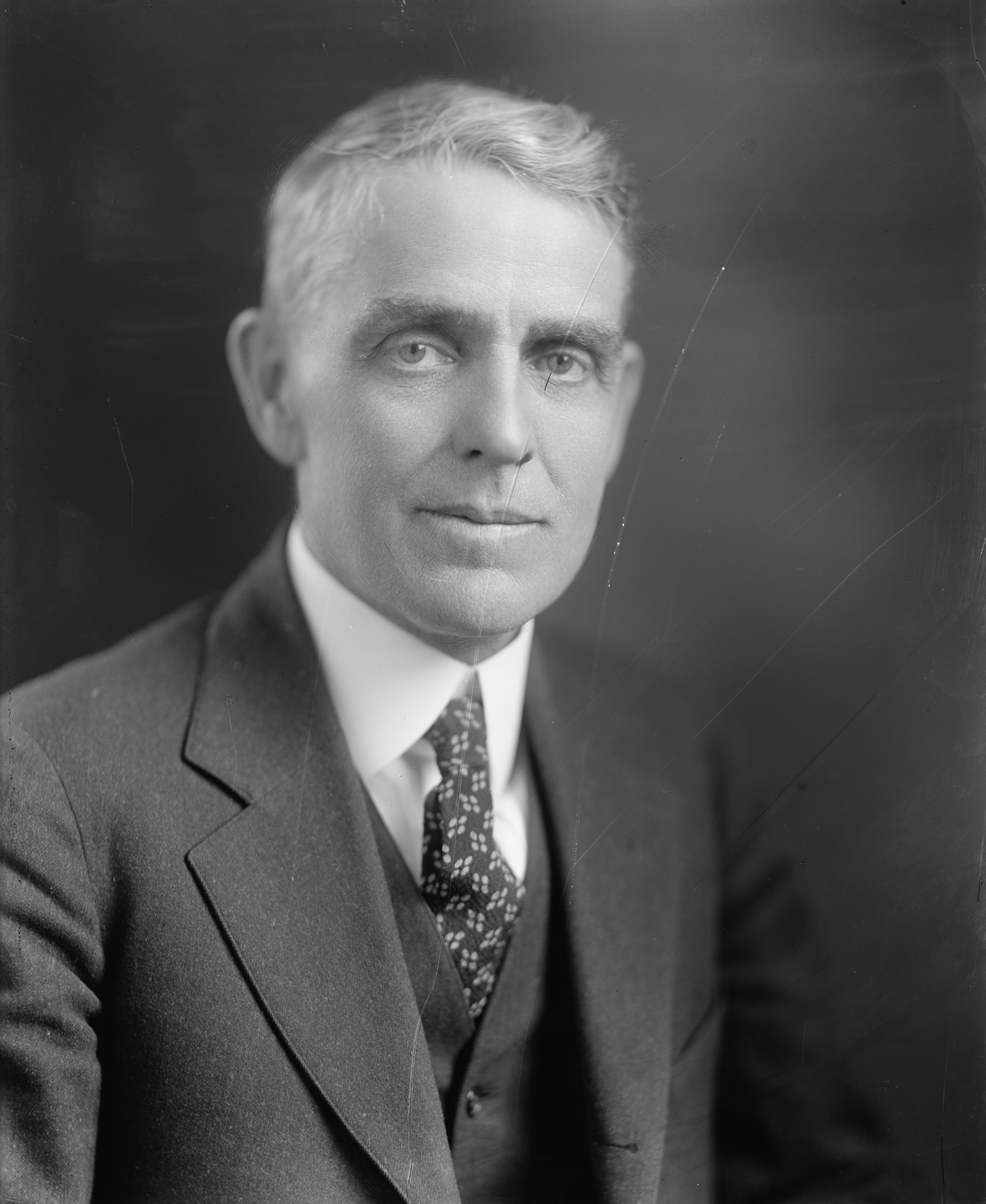

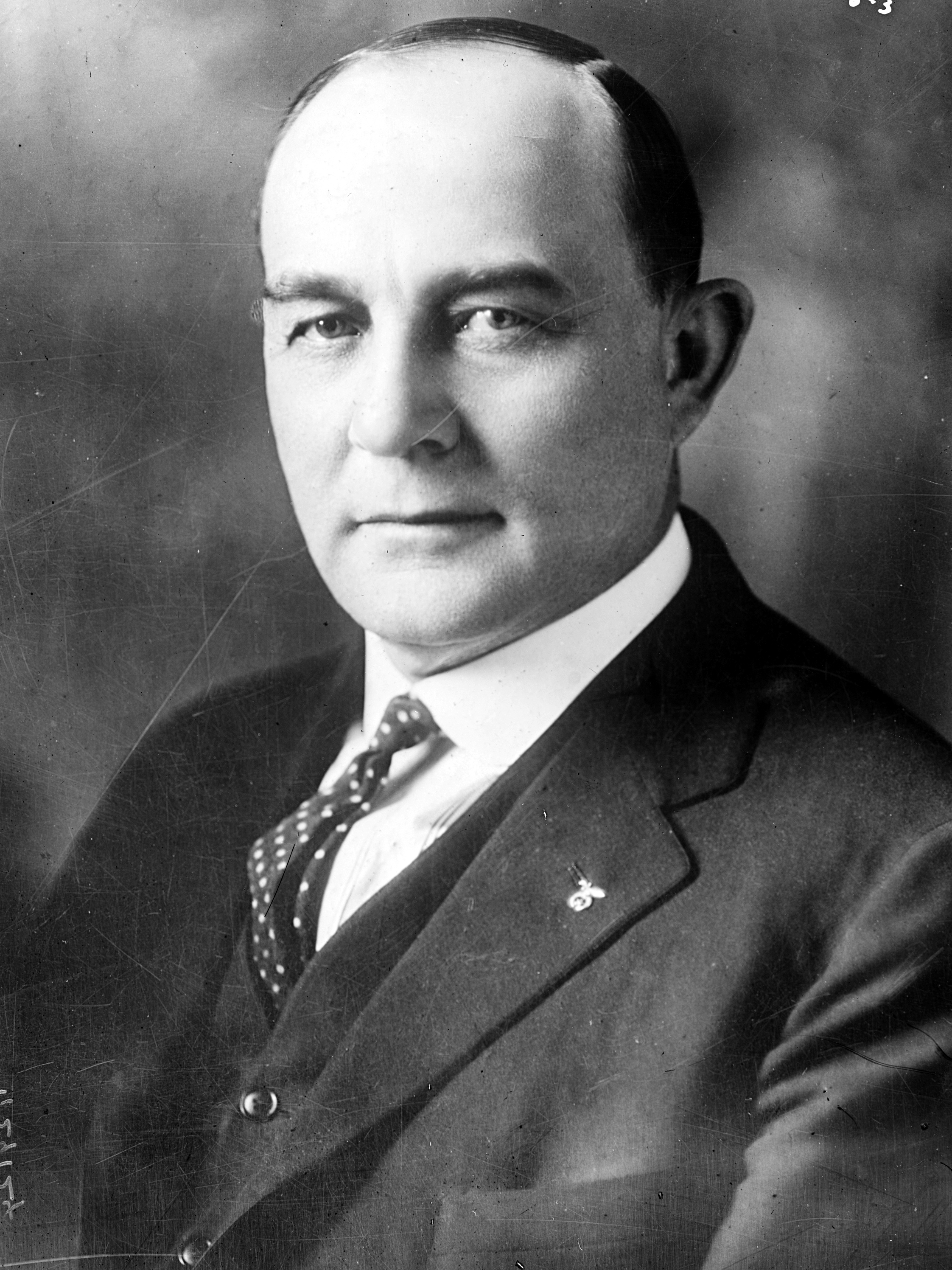
Nominee	Arthur Capper	Jonathan M. Davis
Party	Republican	Democratic
Popular vote	364,548	232,161
Percentage	61.09%	38.91%
- County results Capper: 50–60% 60–70% 70–80% Davis: 50–60% 60–70%
U.S. senator before election
Arthur Capper
Republican
Elected U.S. Senator
Arthur Capper
Republican

The 1930 United States Senate election in Kansas took place on November 4, 1930. Incumbent Republican Senator Arthur Capper ran for re-election to a third term. He was challenged by former Governor Jonathan M. Davis, the Democratic nominee. Despite the nationwide Democratic landslide, Capper easily defeated Davis, winning 61% of the vote.

== Democratic primary ==
=== Candidates ===
- Jonathan M. Davis, former Governor of Kansas

=== Results ===
Democratic primary results
Party	Candidate	Votes	%
Democratic	Jonathan M. Davis	47,685	100.00%
Total votes		47,685	100.00%

== Republican primary ==
=== Candidates ===
- Arthur Capper, incumbent U.S. Senator

=== Results ===
Republican primary results
Party	Candidate	Votes	%
Republican	Arthur Capper (inc.)	231,496	100.00%
Total votes		231,496	100.00%

== General election ==
=== Results ===
1930 United States Senate election in Kansas
Party	Candidate	Votes	%	±%
Republican	Arthur Capper (inc.)	364,548	61.09%	−9.00%
Democratic	Jonathan M. Davis	232,161	38.91%	+13.68%
Majority		132,387	22.19%	−22.69%
Total votes		596,709	100.00%	
Republican hold				

== See also ==
- 1930 United States Senate elections
