= Benjamin S. Paulen =

23rd Governor of Kansas

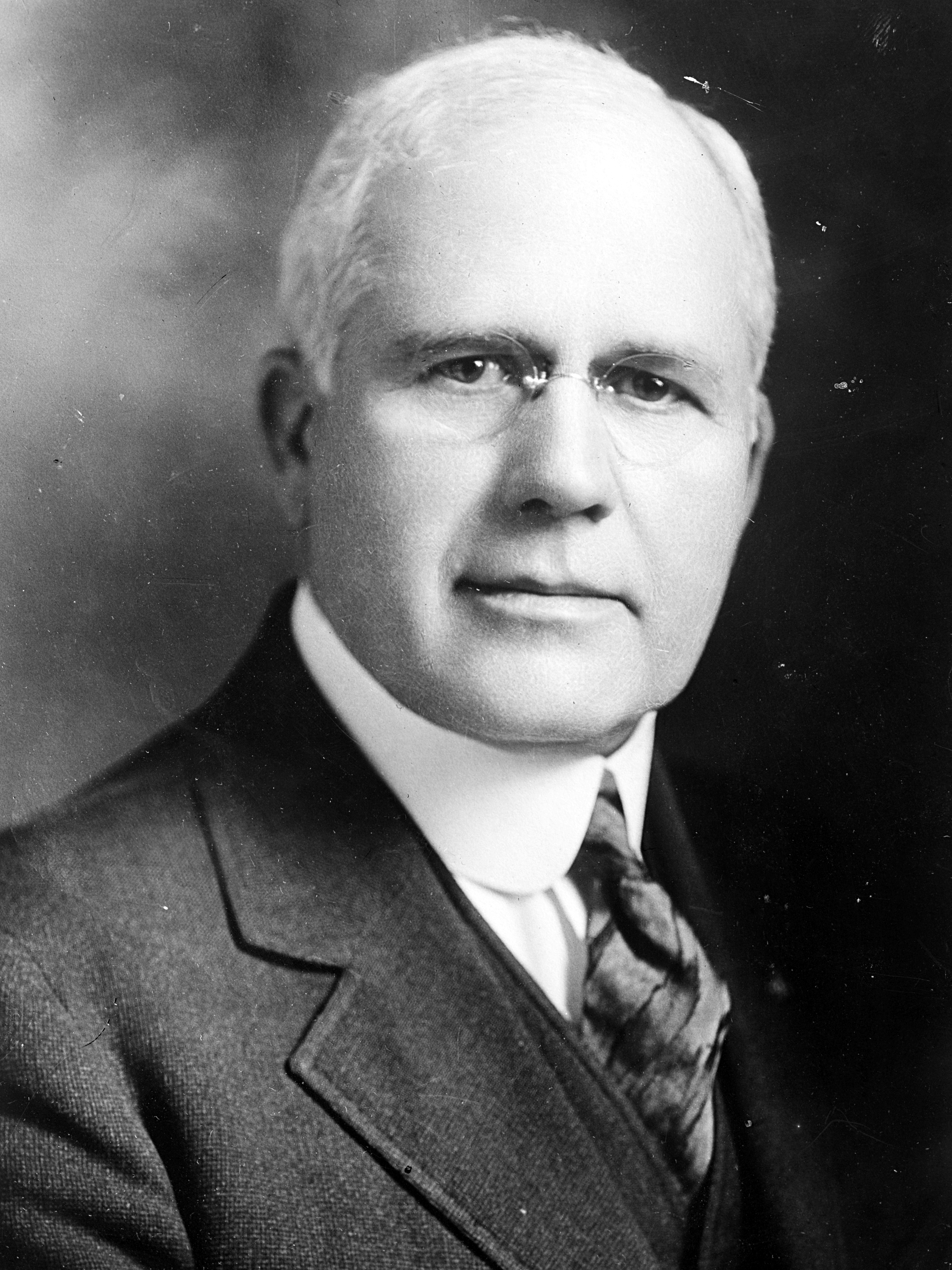

23rd Governor of Kansas
- In office January 12, 1925 – January 14, 1929
- Lieutenant: De Lanson Alson Newton Chase
- Preceded by: Jonathan M. Davis
- Succeeded by: Clyde M. Reed

23rd Lieutenant Governor of Kansas
- In office January 9, 1923 – January 12, 1925
- Governor: Jonathan M. Davis
- Preceded by: Charles Solomon Huffman
- Succeeded by: De Lanson Alson Newton Chase

Member of the Kansas Senate
- In office 1911–1919

Personal details
- Born: July 14, 1869 DeWitt County, Illinois, U.S.
- Died: July 11, 1961 (aged 91) Fredonia, Kansas, U.S.
- Party: Republican
- Spouse: Barbara Ellis
- Profession: hardware clerk, banker, politician

Benjamin Sanford Paulen (July 14, 1869 – July 11, 1961) was an American banker and the 23rd governor of Kansas from 1925 to 1929. He served as mayor of Fredonia, Kansas and in the Kansas Senate.

== Biography ==
Paulen was born in DeWitt County, Illinois to Jacob Walter and Lucy Bell (Johnson) Paulen. The family moved to Wilson County, Kansas, in late 1869 when he was less than six months old. He graduated from Fredonia High School in 1887 and took one term at Kansas University. He took a course at Bryant and Stratton Business College in Saint Louis, Missouri, and then worked in his father's merchandise store in 1889. He married Barbara Ellis in Holton, Kansas, on February 14, 1900, and they had no children.

== Career ==
Paulen served as city councilman, city treasurer, and then mayor of Fredonia. He was elected in 1912 and re-elected in 1916 to the Kansas State Senate. In 1922 Paulen was elected Lieutenant Governor of Kansas.

Paulen received support from the Ku Klux Klan during the Republican gubernatorial primary election in 1924.

Paulen was elected and reelected to serve two terms as Governor of Kansas from 1925 to 1929. During that time, he signed the 1927 Kindergarten Bill into law, cigarette sales became legal and taxed, a state gasoline tax was sanctioned, an insurance code was established, and a banking board was organized.

Paulen served as President of the Kansas Bankers Association and was a member of the executive council of the American Bankers Association. He was a member of the state's constitutional revision committee in 1957.

== Death and legacy ==
Paulen died in 1961 in Fredonia, Kansas. He is interred at Fredonia City Cemetery. Ben S. Paulen Elementary School in Fredonia, now part of Fredonia High School, was named in his honor in 1961.

Party political offices
Preceded by Charles Solomon Huffman	Republican nominee for Lieutenant Governor of Kansas; 1922	Succeeded by De Lanson Alson Newton Chase
Preceded by William Yoast Morgan	Republican nominee for Governor of Kansas; 1924, 1926	Succeeded by Clyde M. Reed
Preceded by Henry Justin Allen	Republican nominee for U.S. Senator from Kansas (Class 3); 1932	Succeeded by Clyde M. Reed
Political offices
Preceded by Charles S. Huffman	Lieutenant Governor of Kansas; 1923–1925	Succeeded by De Lanson Alson Newton Chase
Preceded by Arthur Capper	Governor of Kansas; 1925–1929	Succeeded by Clyde M. Reed
