= 1926 Kansas gubernatorial election =

- November 2, 1926
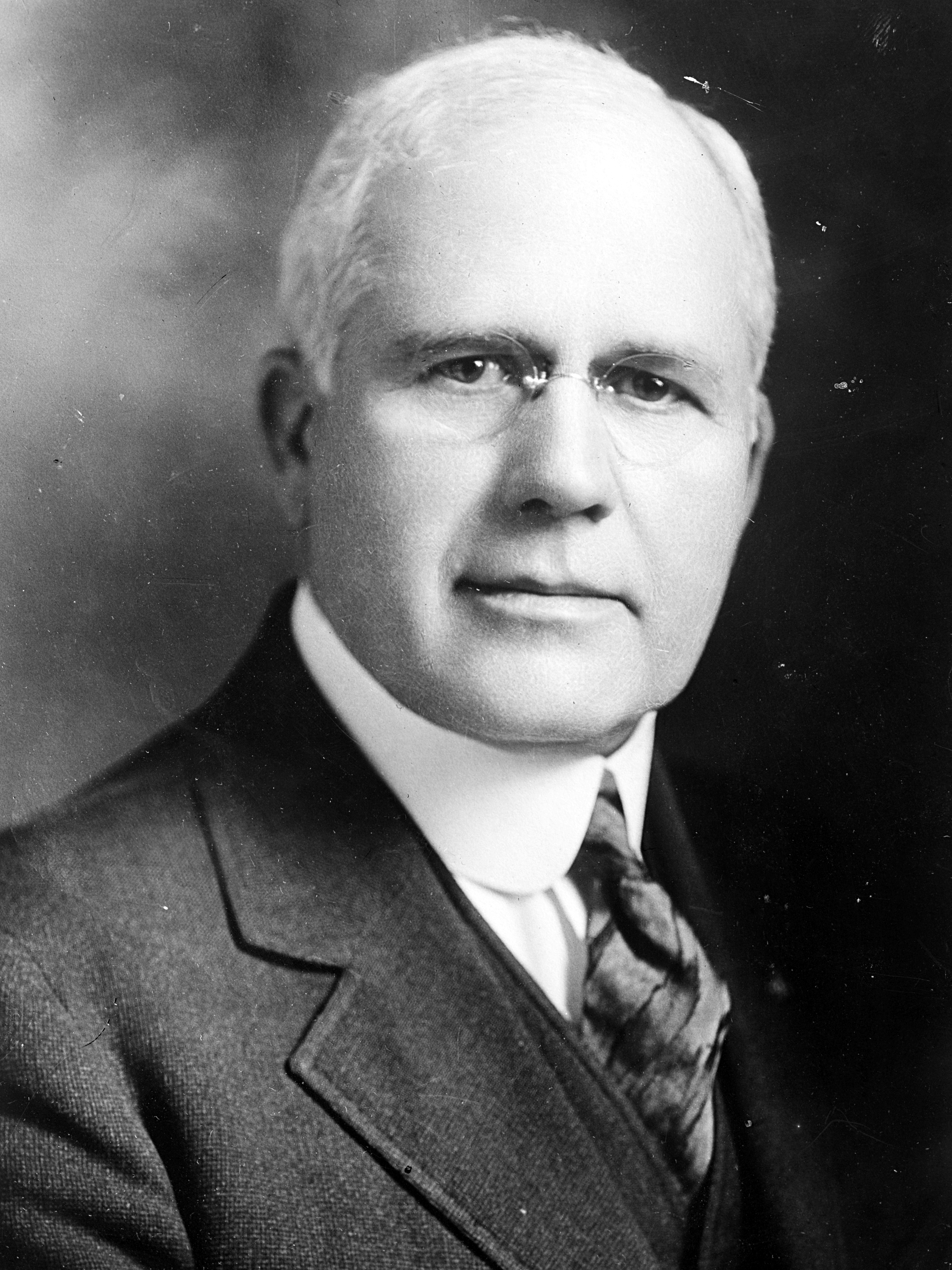

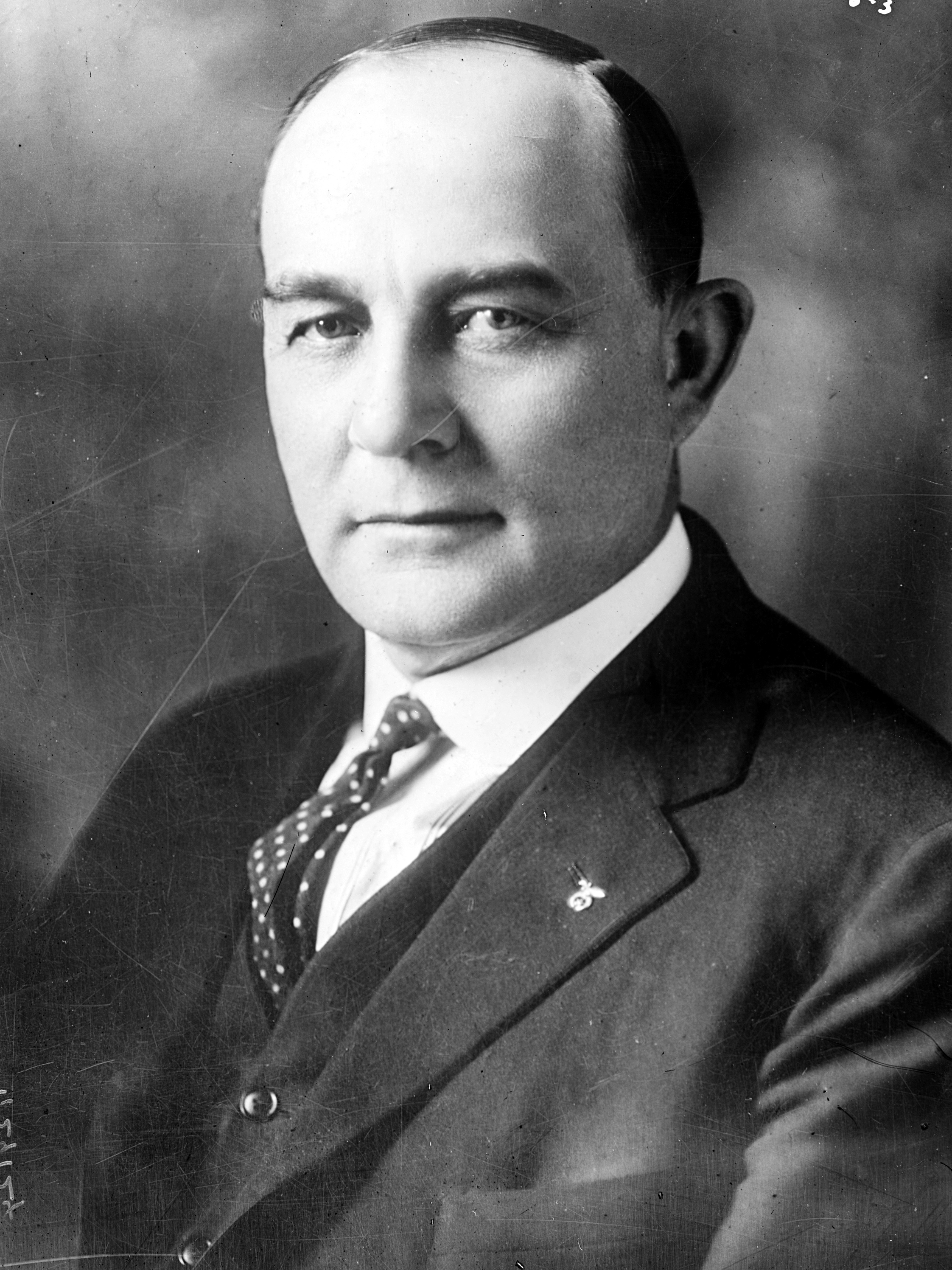
Nominee	Benjamin S. Paulen	Jonathan M. Davis
Party	Republican	Democratic
Popular vote	321,540	179,308
Percentage	63.31%	35.30%
- County results Paulen: 40–50% 50–60% 60–70% 70–80% Davis: 40–50% 50–60%
Governor before election
Benjamin S. Paulen
Republican
Elected Governor
Benjamin S. Paulen
Republican

The 1926 Kansas gubernatorial election was held on November 2, 1926. Incumbent Republican Benjamin S. Paulen defeated Democratic nominee Jonathan M. Davis with 63.31% of the vote.

== General election ==
=== Candidates ===
Major party candidates

- Benjamin S. Paulen, Republican
- Jonathan M. Davis, Democratic

Other candidates

- H. Hilfrich, Socialist

=== Results ===
1926 Kansas gubernatorial election
Party	Candidate	Votes	%	±%
Republican	Benjamin S. Paulen (incumbent)	321,540	63.31%	
Democratic	Jonathan M. Davis	179,308	35.30%	
Socialist	H. Hilfrich	7,046	1.39%	
Majority		142,232		
Turnout				
Republican hold		Swing		
