= 1920 Kansas gubernatorial election =

- November 2, 1920
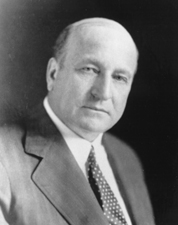

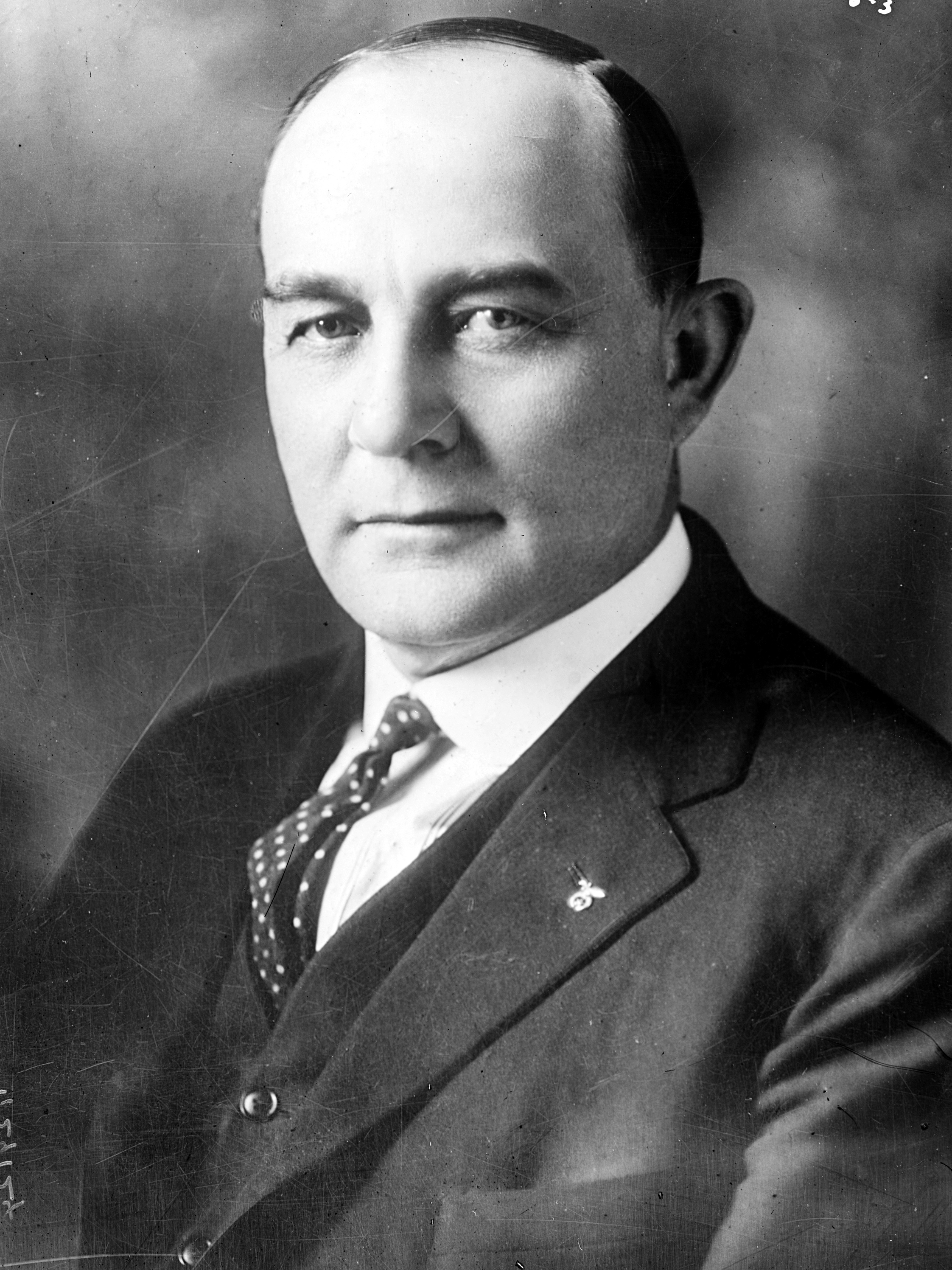
Nominee	Henry Justin Allen	Jonathan M. Davis
Party	Republican	Democratic
Popular vote	319,914	214,940
Percentage	58.44%	39.27%
- County results Allen: 40–50% 50–60% 60–70% 70–80% Davis: 50–60%
Governor before election
Henry Justin Allen
Republican
Elected Governor
Henry Justin Allen
Republican

The 1920 Kansas gubernatorial election was held on November 2, 1920. Incumbent Republican Henry Justin Allen defeated Democratic nominee Jonathan M. Davis with 58.44% of the vote.

== General election ==
=== Candidates ===
Major party candidates

- Henry Justin Allen, Republican
- Jonathan M. Davis, Democratic

Other candidates

- Roy Stanton, Socialist

=== Results ===
1920 Kansas gubernatorial election
Party	Candidate	Votes	%	±%
Republican	Henry Justin Allen (incumbent)	319,914	58.44%	
Democratic	Jonathan M. Davis	214,940	39.27%	
Socialist	Roy Stanton	12,544	2.29%	
Majority		104,974		
Turnout				
Republican hold		Swing		
