= 1924 Kansas gubernatorial election =

- November 4, 1924
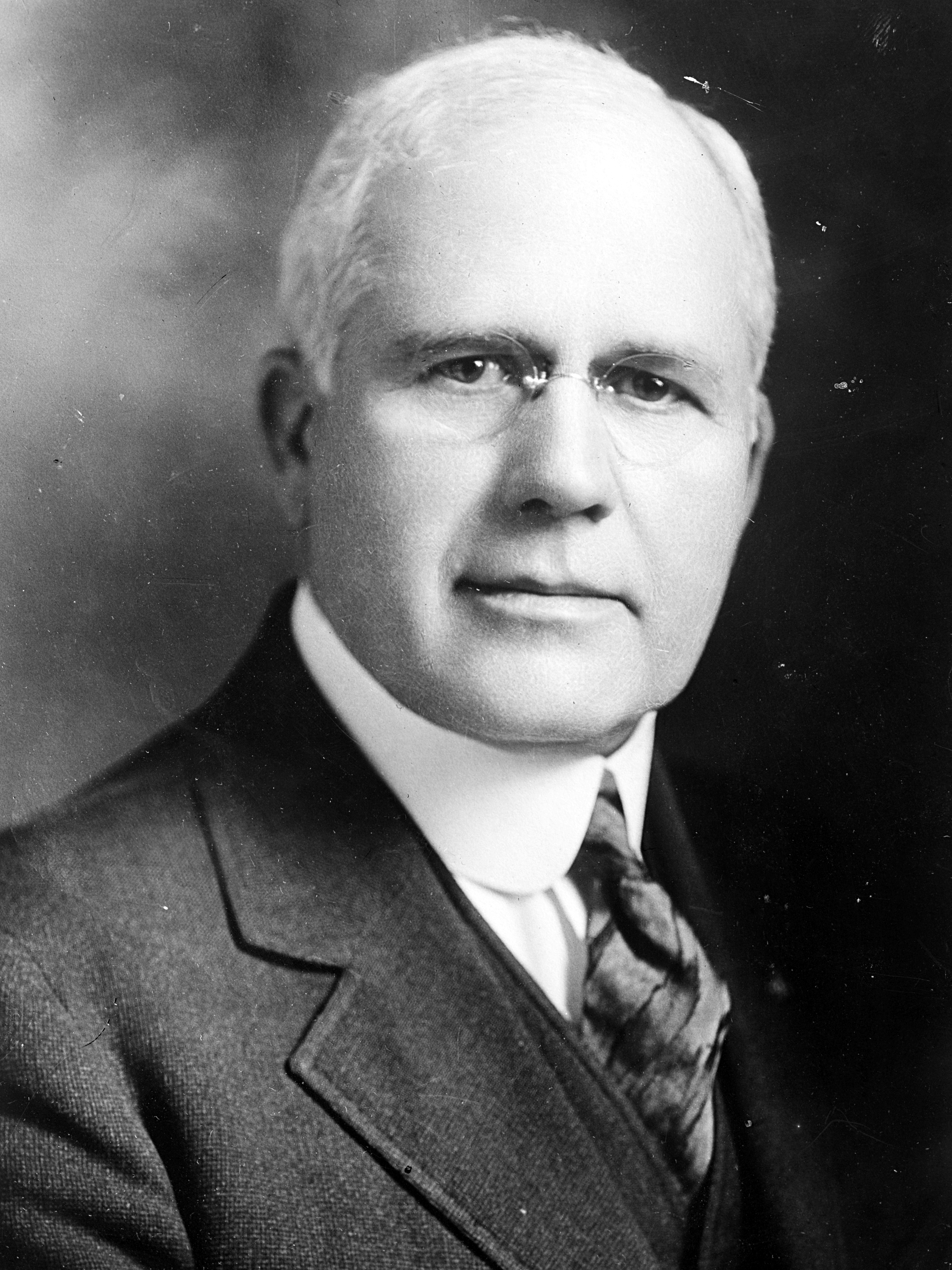

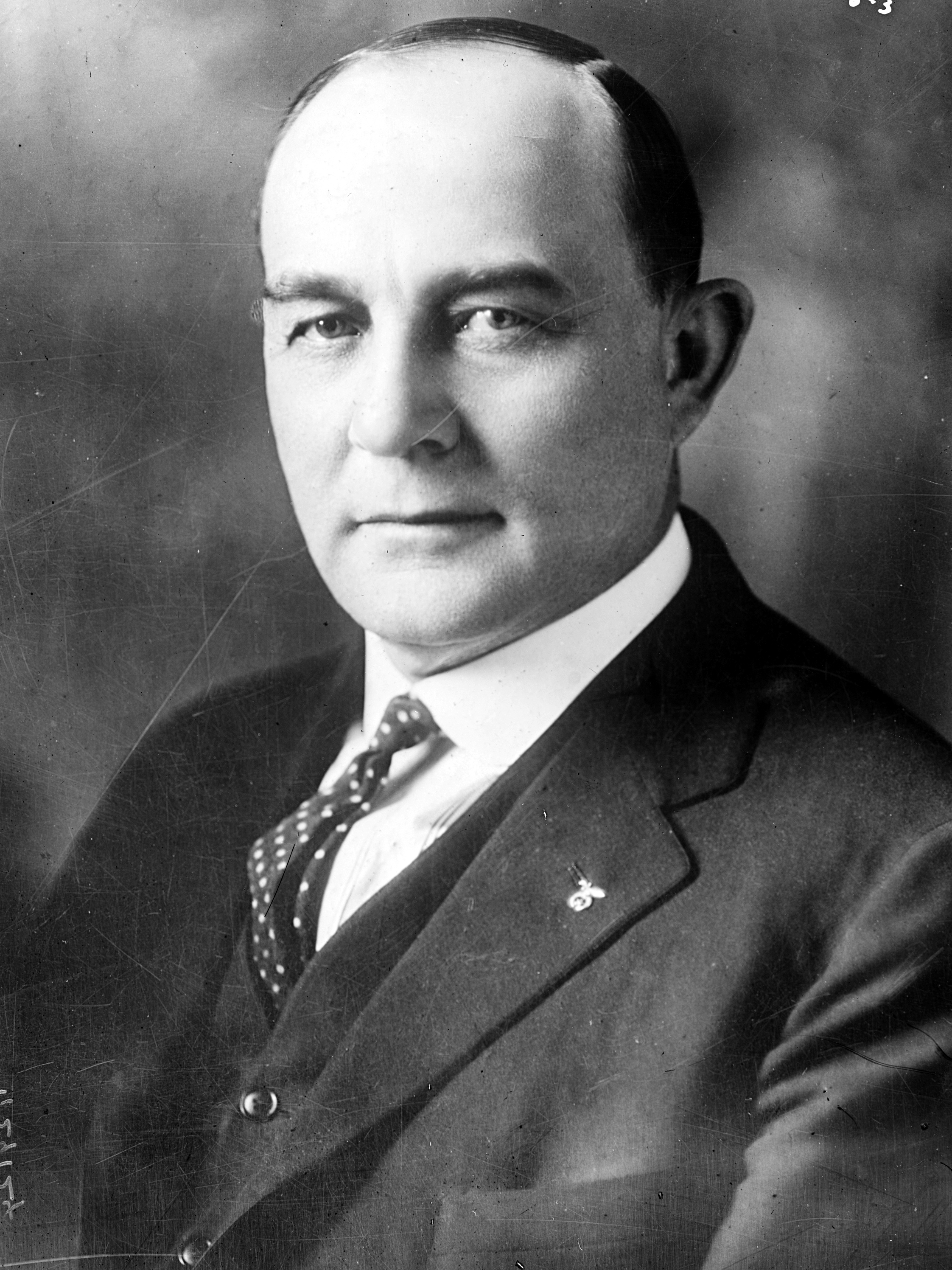

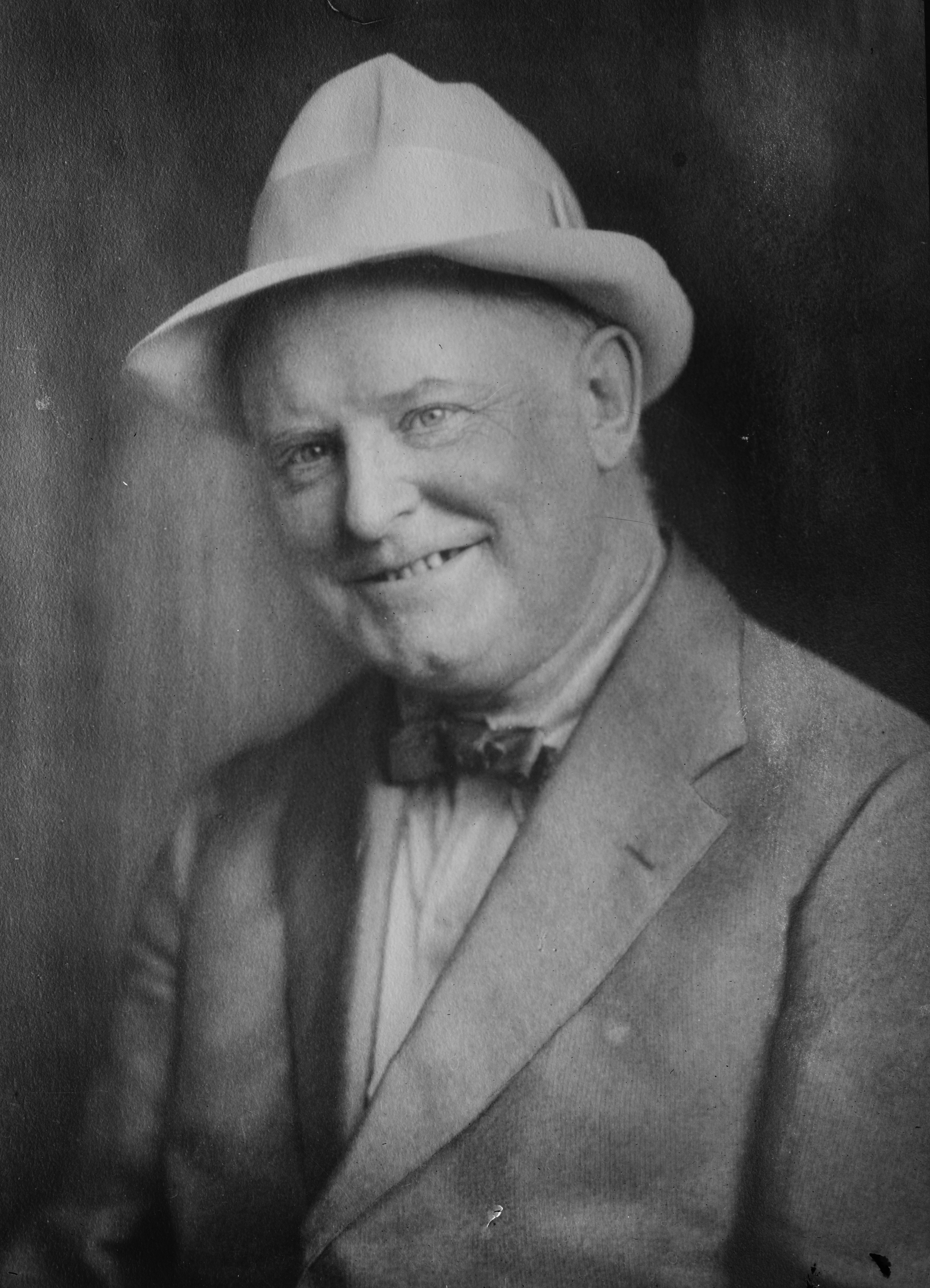
Nominee	Benjamin S. Paulen	Jonathan M. Davis	William Allen White
Party	Republican	Democratic	Independent
Popular vote	323,403	182,861	149,811
Percentage	49.02%	27.72%	22.71%
- County results Paulen: 30–40% 40–50% 50–60% 60–70% Davis: 40–50% 50–60% White: 30–40%
Governor before election
Jonathan M. Davis
Democratic
Elected Governor
Benjamin S. Paulen
Republican

The 1924 Kansas gubernatorial election was held on November 4, 1924. Republican nominee Benjamin S. Paulen defeated Democratic incumbent Jonathan M. Davis with 49.02% of the vote.

== General election ==
=== Candidates ===
Major party candidates

- Benjamin S. Paulen, Republican
- Jonathan M. Davis, Democratic

Other candidates

- William Allen White, Independent
- M. L. Phillips, Socialist

=== Results ===
1924 Kansas gubernatorial election
Party	Candidate	Votes	%	±%
Republican	Benjamin S. Paulen	323,403	49.02%	
Democratic	Jonathan M. Davis (incumbent)	182,861	27.72%	
Independent	William Allen White	149,811	22.71%	
Socialist	M. L. Phillips	3,606	0.55%	
Majority		140,542		
Turnout				
Republican gain from Democratic		Swing		
