= Arthur J. Carruth Jr. =

Arthur Jay Carruth Jr. (July 26, 1887 – September 29, 1962) was a leading newspaperman and civic leader in Kansas for more than five decades.

== Education ==
Carruth was born into a family of journalists in Clinton, New York. In 1900 his parents moved the family from New York to Herrington, Kansas, where Caherruth graduated from high school. He then attended Washburn College, where in about 1907 he became a member of the Delta Phi fraternity. In 1910 Delta Phi became the Kansas Beta chapter of Phi Delta Theta, with Carruth the fifth man being initiated. A member of the fraternity's Golden Legion, Carruth was named the Topeka Area Alumni Club's “Phi of the Year” in 1959.

At Washburn, Carruth was the editor of both the school paper, The Review, and its yearbook, The Kaw. The 1908 Kaw stated that he was the "editor of the best Review ever published" and that he "will enter newspaper work next year."

== Journalism career ==
During a more than 50-year career as a journalist, Carruth held almost every position possible, from cub reporter to co-owner of the Topeka State Journal.

The Journal was a politically independent afternoon paper published Monday to Saturday with a daily circulation of 17,000 by the time of its sale in 1940. Oscar Stauffer's Topeka Daily Capital, on the other hand, was considered more closely aligned with the Republicans.

In the mid-1920s Carruth began a column published under his initials, "AJC", entitled "Under the Whispering Willow" which ran on Saturdays for 38 years. In all that time only two issues were missed when the columnist was hospitalized.

For a quarter of a century Carruth was managing editor of the newspaper until its sale in 1940 to Stauffer Publications. At the time, daily circulation was 17,000. He was one of three partners who owned the paper, the other two being former Senator Henry Allen and William P. Snyder. Snyder and Carruth had been fraternity brothers at Washburn.

Carruth's column was published until the day of his death, September 29, 1962. He was inducted into the Kansas Newspaper Hall of Fame in 1966.

== Civic leader ==
Carruth was a long-time supporter of his alma mater. From the time of the university's conversion to a municipal university in 1941 until the time of his death, he was the chairman of its board of regents. In 1958 he was inducted into the school' prestigious Sagamore Honor Society. In 1960 a three-story residence hall was dedicated to him. Carruth Hall was torn down in 1999 to make way for the current Living Learning Center.

A mason, Carruth was active in a variety of civic and professional groups. He was president and an active member for all his professional life of the Topeka Press Club. He helped found the Shawnee County Historical Society, the Topeka Civic Orchestra and the Topeka Rotary Club. He served on the board of the Topeka Library, which later dedicated its newspaper collection to Carruth.
