= William Albert Morgan =

American politician

William Albert Morgan (born Bandon, County Cork, Ireland, March 6, 1841; died Hutchinson, Kansas, March 24, 1917) was an Irish-American newspaper publisher, politician and prominent citizen of the state of Kansas.

== Early years ==
Morgan's father James Morgan was an Irish wool comber, farmer and stock raiser. He came to America in 1847 with his four sons after the death of his wife Katherine in 1845, settling in Cincinnati. William Morgan was educated in the public schools and at thirteen entered a printing office to learn that trade. During the Civil War he served in the 23rd Regiment Kentucky Volunteer Infantry, rising to be a first lieutenant after 3 years service.

== Life in Kansas ==
Morgan returned to the printing business and remained in Cincinnati until 1871, when he moved to Cottonwood Falls, Kansas and started the Chase County Leader newspaper, continuing it until his retirement in 1903. He was a Republican and in 1879 he represented Chase County in the state legislature. From 1893-5 he was a state senator, active in promoting prohibition. In 1891 he was part of a government commission which negotiated a treaty with the Paiute residents of the Pyramid Lake Indian Reservation in Nevada; the treaty was never ratified by Congress.

Morgan was involved with the Grand Army of the Republic, serving as commander of the Department of Kansas 1908-9. He was a long-time member and director of the Kansas Historical Society.

== Family ==
Morgan married Wilhelmina Yoast (1843-1910) in 1864. She was active in many social and political organizations, working for woman suffrage and prohibition, and was elected mayor of Cottonwood Falls in 1885 on a prohibition platform. They had two children, Anna Morgan Coe (1871-1953) and William Yoast Morgan (1866-1932), lieutenant governor of Kansas from 1915-1919.
