= Charles Solomon Huffman =

American politician

Charles Solomon Huffman (8 October 1865 – 6 May 1960) was an American politician. Between 1919 and 1923 he served as Lieutenant Governor of Kansas.

== Life ==
Charles Huffman was born in Vincennes, Indiana and attended local schools. In his younger years he worked on his father's farm. After his graduation from high school in 1883 he taught school for some time and he studied medicine at the University of Missouri. Starting in 1890 he practiced as a physician in Columbus, Kansas. During the Spanish–American War he served in the Philippines as a captain in the medical department of the US forces. Shortly after the turn of the century he terminated his medical career. Instead he was engaged in banking and became one of the directors of the Columbus State Bank. He became the president of this bank in 1915. He held this position until 1960, just before his death. Between 1917 and 1919 he was also Adjutant General of the Kansas National Guard. In addition he was a member of various organizations.

Huffman joined the Republican Party. Between 1904 and 1919 he was a member of the Kansas Senate. For four years he was the chairperson of the Committee on Ways and Means. In 1918 he was elected to the office of the Lieutenant Governor of Kansas. After a re-election in 1920 he served two terms in this position between 13 January 1919 and 8 January 1923 when his second term ended. In this function he was the deputy of Governor Henry Justin Allen. After the end of his time as Lieutenant Governor Huffman continued his career in the banking business. He died on 6 May 1960 in Columbus (Kansas) at the age of 94.

Party political offices
| Preceded by William Yoast Morgan | Republican nominee for Lieutenant Governor of Kansas; 1918, 1920 | Succeeded by Benjamin S. Paulen |
Political offices
| Preceded by William Yoast Morgan | Lieutenant Governor of Kansas; 1919–1923 | Succeeded by Benjamin S. Paulen |
