= Henry J. Allen =

American politician (1868–1950)

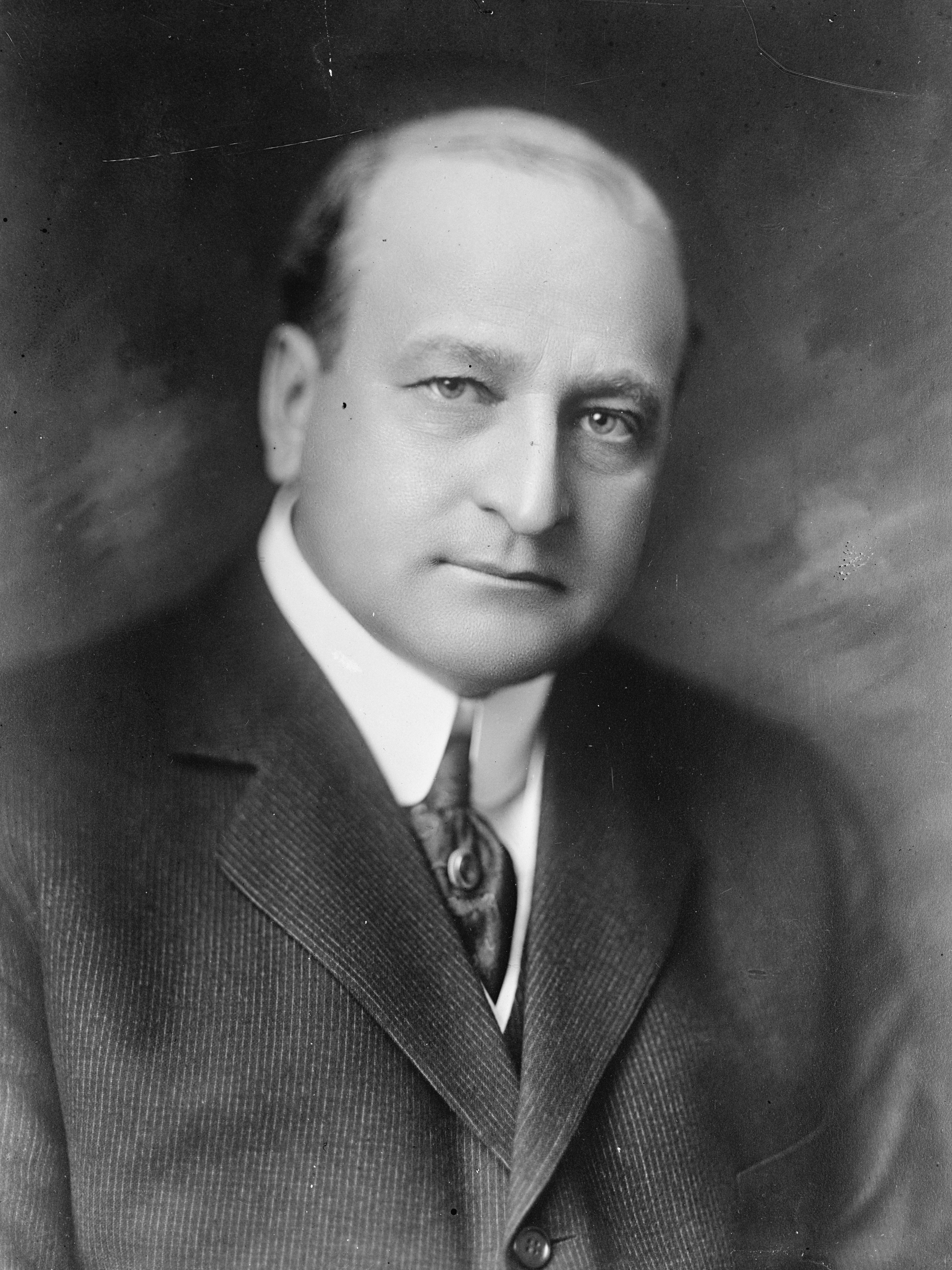
- Allen in 1917

United States Senator from Kansas
- In office April 1, 1929 – November 30, 1930
- Appointed by: Clyde M. Reed
- Preceded by: Charles Curtis
- Succeeded by: George McGill

Chair of the National Governors Association
- In office 1919
- Preceded by: Emerson Harrington
- Succeeded by: William Cameron Sproul

21st Governor of Kansas
- In office January 13, 1919 – January 8, 1923
- Lieutenant: Charles Solomon Huffman
- Preceded by: Arthur Capper
- Succeeded by: Jonathan M. Davis

Personal details
- Born: September 11, 1868 Pittsfield, Pennsylvania, U.S.
- Died: January 17, 1950 (aged 81) Wichita, Kansas, U.S.
- Party: Republican
- Other political affiliations: Progressive (1912–1916)
- Spouse: Elsie Nuzman
- Education: Washburn University; Baker University
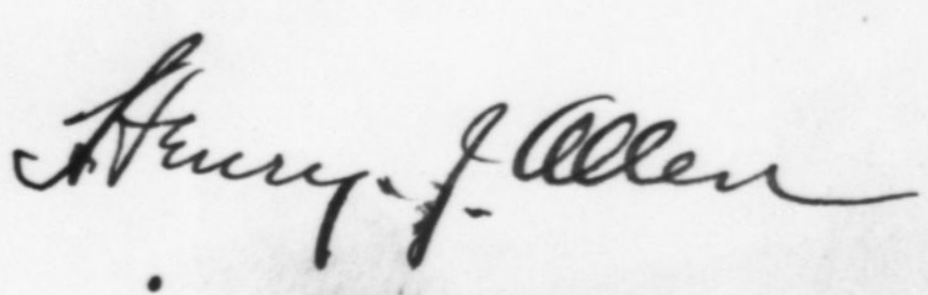
- Signature

Henry Justin Allen (September 11, 1868 – January 17, 1950) was an American politician who served as the 21st governor of Kansas from 1919 to 1923 and as a United States senator from 1929 to 1930.

== Life and career ==
Allen was born in Pittsfield Township, Pennsylvania, to John and Rebecca Elizabeth (Goodwin) Allen. In 1870, his family moved to Kansas, where it settled in Clay County.

Before becoming active in politics, Allen acquired ownership of newspapers throughout Kansas, beginning in 1894 with the Manhattan Nationalist in Manhattan, Kansas. He owned the Topeka State Journal with Arthur J. Carruth Jr. and William P. Snyder, and the Parsons Sun newspaper in Parsons, Kansas. Generally forward-looking in his outlook, he hired Frank Lloyd Wright to design his home in Wichita, Kansas. Allen's home is the only residence designed by Wright in Kansas.

Allen was in France with William Allen White inspecting the facilities provided to Kansas soldiers of the American Expeditionary Force during World War I when his party nominated him for the office of governor. During the campaign in 1918, Allen never spent any of his own money and learned about his nomination from a Parisian newspaper. He served from 1919 to 1923.

Faced with a coal field strike in 1920, Allen pushed through the legislature a plan to prohibit strikes and send labor disputes to an industrial court. The court plan attracted nationwide interest; Allen debated American Federation of Labor president Samuel Gompers on the issue at Carnegie Hall in New York City on May 28, 1920. When publisher William Allen White objected to the court, Allen had him arrested. White won the 1923 Pulitzer Prize for his editorial "To an Anxious Friend," published July 27, 1922, opposing the law.

After leaving the governorship, Allen was U.S. Special Commissioner for Near East Relief in Armenia, Turkey, Greece, and Southern Russia. In 1928, he was Director of Publicity for the Republican National Committee.

In April 1929, he was appointed to the United States Senate to fill the vacancy caused when Charles Curtis resigned to become Vice President. Allen served from April 1, 1929, to November 30, 1930. He ran for the remainder of Curtis' term and was narrowly defeated by George McGill.

Allen died in 1950 following a cerebral thrombosis in Wichita, Kansas. He is buried at the Maple Grove Cemetery in Wichita. Allen was posthumously inducted into the Kansas Newspaper Hall of Fame two years later.

Party political offices
| First | Progressive nominee for Governor of Kansas; 1914 | Succeeded by None |
| Preceded by Arthur Capper | Republican nominee for Governor of Kansas; 1918, 1920 | Succeeded by William Yoast Morgan |
| Preceded by Charles Curtis | Republican nominee for U.S. Senator from Kansas (Class 3); 1930 | Succeeded by Benjamin S. Paulen |
Political offices
| Preceded by Arthur Capper | Governor of Kansas; 1919–1923 | Succeeded by Jonathan M. Davis |
| Preceded by Emerson Harrington | Chair of the National Governors Association; 1919 | Succeeded by William Cameron Sproul |
U.S. Senate
| Preceded by Charles Curtis | United States Senator (Class 3) from Kansas; 1929–1930; Served alongside: Arthur Capper | Succeeded by George McGill |
