= William Allen White =

American newspaper editor and Progressive leader (1868–1944)

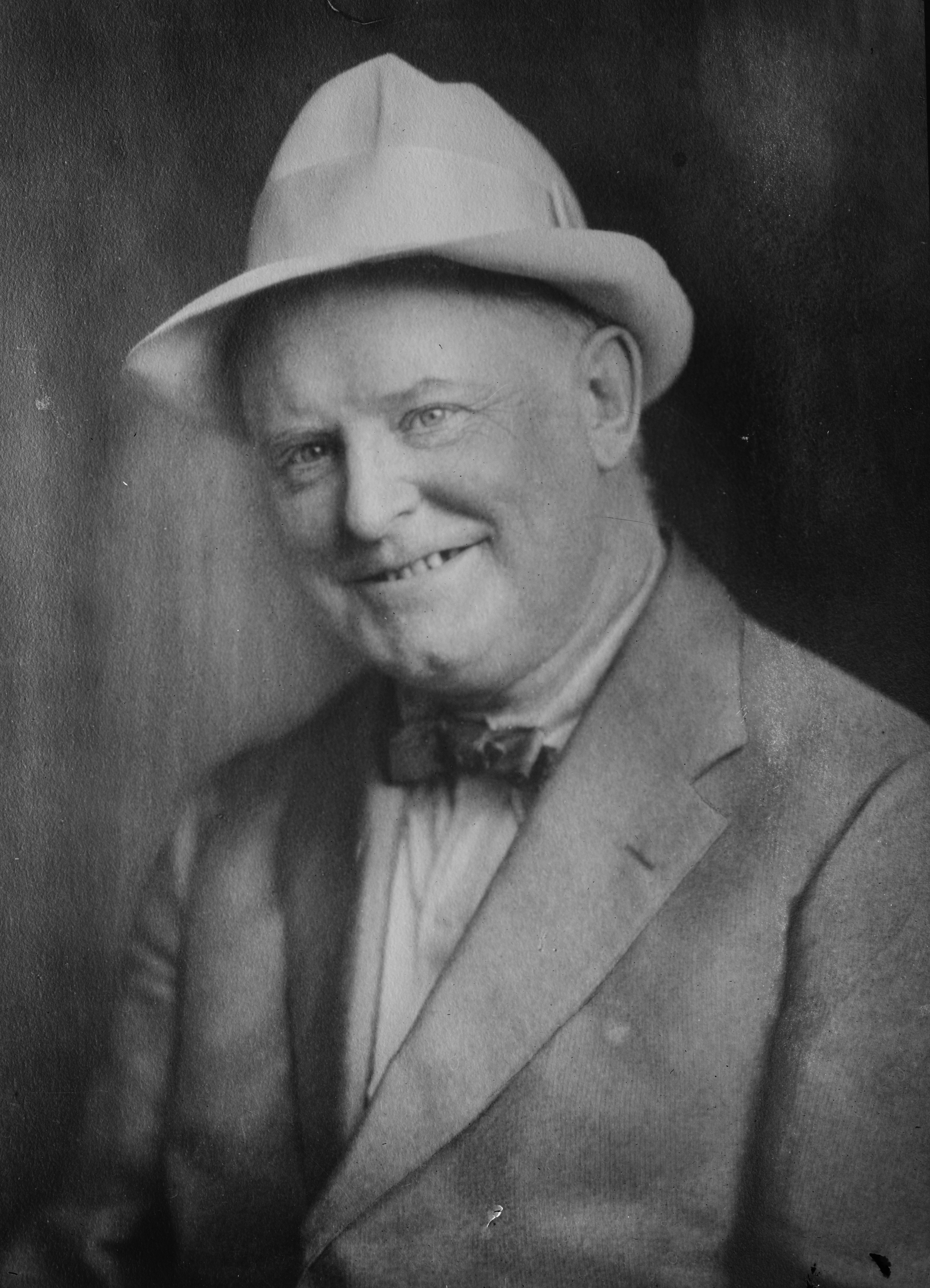
- White in 1924
- Born: February 10, 1868; Emporia, Kansas, U.S.
- Died: January 29, 1944 (aged 75); Emporia, Kansas, U.S.
- Education: College of Emporia; University of Kansas
- Occupations: Newspaper editor, author
- Political party: Republican; Progressive (Bull Moose) Party
- Spouse: Sallie Lindsay (m. 1893)
- Children: 2; including William
- Parent(s): Allen, Mary Ann

William Allen White (February 10, 1868 – January 29, 1944) was an American newspaper editor, politician, author, and leader of the Progressive movement. Between 1896 and his death, White became a spokesman for middle America.

At a 1937 banquet held in his honor by the Kansas Editorial Association, he was called "the most loved and most distinguished member" of the Kansas press.

== Early life ==
White was born in Emporia, Kansas and moved to El Dorado, Kansas, with his parents, Allen and Mary Ann Hatten White, where he spent the majority of his childhood. He loved animals and reading books. He attended the College of Emporia and the University of Kansas, and in 1889 started work at The Kansas City Star as an editorial writer.

== The Emporia Gazette ==
In 1895, White bought the Emporia Gazette for $3,000 and became its editor, remaining it for the rest of his life.

=== What's the matter with Kansas? – 1896 ===
White was a political conservative at this early stage of his career. In 1896 a White editorial titled "What's the Matter With Kansas?" attracted national attention with a scathing attack on William Jennings Bryan, the Democrats, and the Populists. White sharply ridiculed Populist leaders for letting Kansas slip into economic stagnation and not keeping up economically with neighboring states because their anti-business policies frightened away economic capital from the state. White wrote:

"There are two ideas of government," said our noble Bryan at Chicago. "There are those who believe that if you legislate to make the well-to-do prosperous, this prosperity will leak through on those below. The Democratic idea has been that if you legislate to make the masses prosperous their prosperity will find its way up and through every class and rest upon them." That's the stuff! Give the prosperous man the dickens! Legislate the thriftless man into ease, whack the stuffing out of the creditors and tell the debtors who borrowed the money five years ago when money "per capita" was greater than it is now, that the contraction of currency gives him a right to repudiate.

The Republicans sent out hundreds of thousands of copies of the editorial in support of William McKinley during the intensely fought presidential election of 1896, providing White with national exposure.

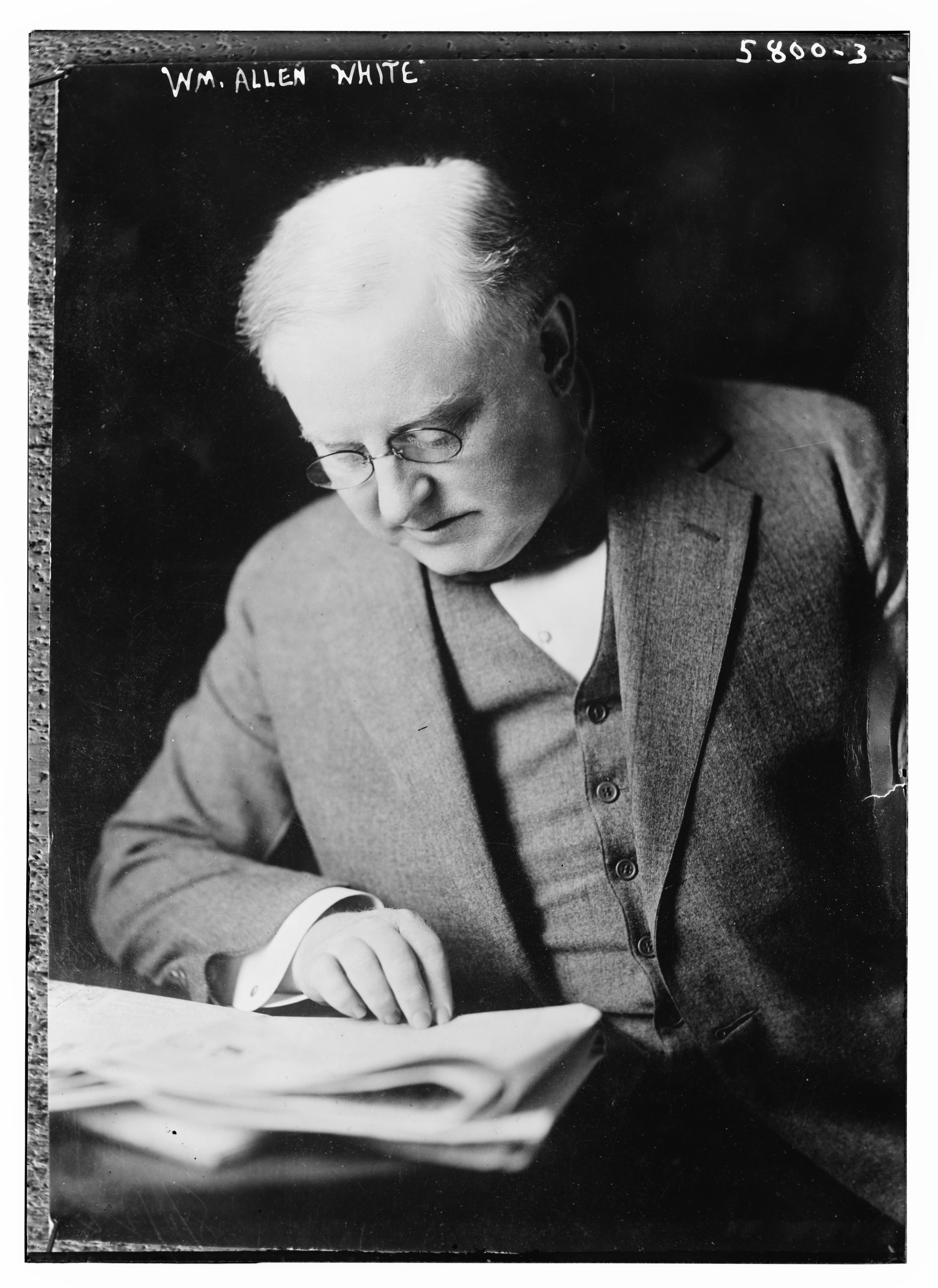
White c. 1920–1925

With his warm sense of humor, articulate editorial pen, and uncommon sense approach to life, White soon became known throughout the country. His Gazette editorials were widely reprinted; he wrote stories on politics syndicated by the George Matthew Adams Service; and he published many books, including biographies of Woodrow Wilson and Calvin Coolidge. "What's the Matter With Kansas?" and "Mary White" (a tribute to his 16-year-old daughter on her death in 1921) were his best-known writings. Locally he was known as the greatest booster for Emporia.

He won a 1923 Pulitzer Prize for his editorial "To an Anxious Friend", published July 27, 1922, after being arrested in a dispute over free speech following objections to the way the state of Kansas handled the men who participated in the Great Railroad Strike of 1922.

=== Small-town ideals ===
In his novels and short stories, White developed his idea of the small town as a metaphor for understanding social change and for preaching the necessity of community. While he expressed his views in terms of the small town, he tailored his rhetoric to the needs and values of emerging urban America. The cynicism of the post-World War I world stilled his imaginary literature, but for the remainder of his life he continued to propagate his vision of small-town community. He opposed chain stores and mail order firms as a threat to the business owner on Main Street. The Great Depression shook his faith in a cooperative, selfless, middle-class America. Like most old Progressives his attitude toward the New Deal was ambivalent: President Franklin D. Roosevelt cared for the country and was personally attractive, but White considered his solutions haphazard. White saw the country uniting behind old ideals by 1940, in the face of foreign threats.

==== Fighting corruption ====
White sought to encourage a viable moral order that would provide the nation with a sense of community. He recognized the powerful forces of corruption but called for slow, remedial change having its origin in the middle class. In his novel In the Heart of a Fool (1918), White fully developed the idea that reform remained the soundest ally of property rights. He felt that the Spanish–American War fostered political unity, and believed that a moral victory and an advance in civilization would be compensation for the devastation of World War I. White concluded that democracy in the New Era inevitably lacked direction, and the New Deal found him a baffled spectator. Nevertheless, he clung to his vision of a cooperative society until his death in 1944.

== Politics ==
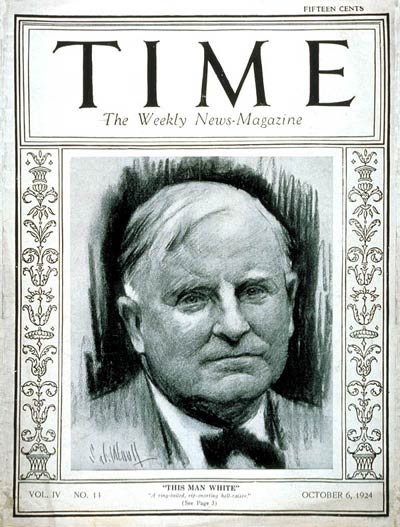
Time cover, 6 Oct 1924

White became a leader of the Progressive movement in Kansas, forming the Kansas Republican League in 1912 to oppose railroads. White helped Theodore Roosevelt form the Progressive (Bull-Moose) Party in the 1912 presidential election in opposition to the conservative forces surrounding incumbent Republican president William Howard Taft.

White was a reporter at the Paris Peace Conference in 1919 and a strong supporter of Woodrow Wilson's proposal for the League of Nations. The League went into operation but the U.S. never joined. During the 1920s, White was critical of both the isolationism and the conservatism of the Republican Party.

According to Roger Bresnahan:

White's finest hour came in his vigorous assault, beginning with Gazette editorials in 1921, on the Ku Klux Klan – a crusade that led him to run for governor of Kansas in 1924 so that his anti-Klan message would reach a broader state and national audience. As expected, White did not win the election, but he was widely credited with deflating Klan intentions in Kansas.

In the 1928 presidential election, he condemned the Democratic nominee Al Smith as the candidate of "the saloon, prostitution, and gambling" for Smith's opposition to Prohibition. He was an early supporter of Republican presidential nominees Alf Landon of Kansas in 1936 and Wendell Willkie in 1940. However, White was on the liberal wing of the Republican Party and wrote many editorials praising the New Deal of President Franklin D. Roosevelt.

== Sponsoring painter John Steuart Curry ==
White was the leader in persuading Kansas newspaper editors and publishers to run a fund-raising campaign so as to invite Kansas's most famous artist, John Steuart Curry, to paint murals for Kansas. He got the support of Governor Walter Huxman and other politicians, and the result was the prestigious invitation to paint murals for the Kansas Capitol. The result was Tragic Prelude.

== Sage of Emporia ==
The last quarter century of White's life was spent as an unofficial national spokesman for Middle America. This led President Franklin Roosevelt to ask White to help generate public support for the Allies before America's entry into World War II. In 1940 White was fundamental in the formation of the Committee to Defend America by Aiding the Allies, sometimes known as the White Committee. He resigned on January 3, 1941, writing to a newspaper columnist that "In our New York and Washington chapters we have a bunch of war mongers and under our organization we have no way to oust them and I just can't remain at the head of an organization that is being used by those chapters to ghost dance for war."

Sometimes referred to as the Sage of Emporia, he continued to write editorials for the Gazette until his death in 1944. He was also a founding editor of the Book of the Month Club, along with longtime friend Dorothy Canfield.

== Family ==
White married Sallie Lindsay in 1893. They had two children, William Lindsay, born in 1900, and Mary Katherine, born in 1904. Mary died in a 1921 horseback-riding accident, prompting her father to publish a famous eulogy, "Mary White," on May 17, 1921.

White visited six of the seven continents at least once in his long life. Due to his fame and success, he received 10 honorary degrees from universities, including one from Harvard.

White taught his son William L. the importance of journalism, and after his death, William L. took charge of the Gazette and continued its local success; after he died, his wife Kathrine ran it. Their daughter Barbara and her husband, David Walker, took it over much as William had earlier, and today the paper remains family-run, currently headed by William Allen White's great-grandson, Christopher White Walker.

== White and the two Roosevelts ==
White developed a friendship with President Theodore Roosevelt in the 1890s that lasted until Roosevelt's death in 1919. Roosevelt spent several nights at White's Wight and Wight-designed home, Red Rocks, during trips across the United States. White was to say later, "Roosevelt bit me and I went mad." Later, White supported much of the New Deal, but voted against Franklin D. Roosevelt every time.

== Famous visitors to Red Rocks (White family home in Emporia) ==
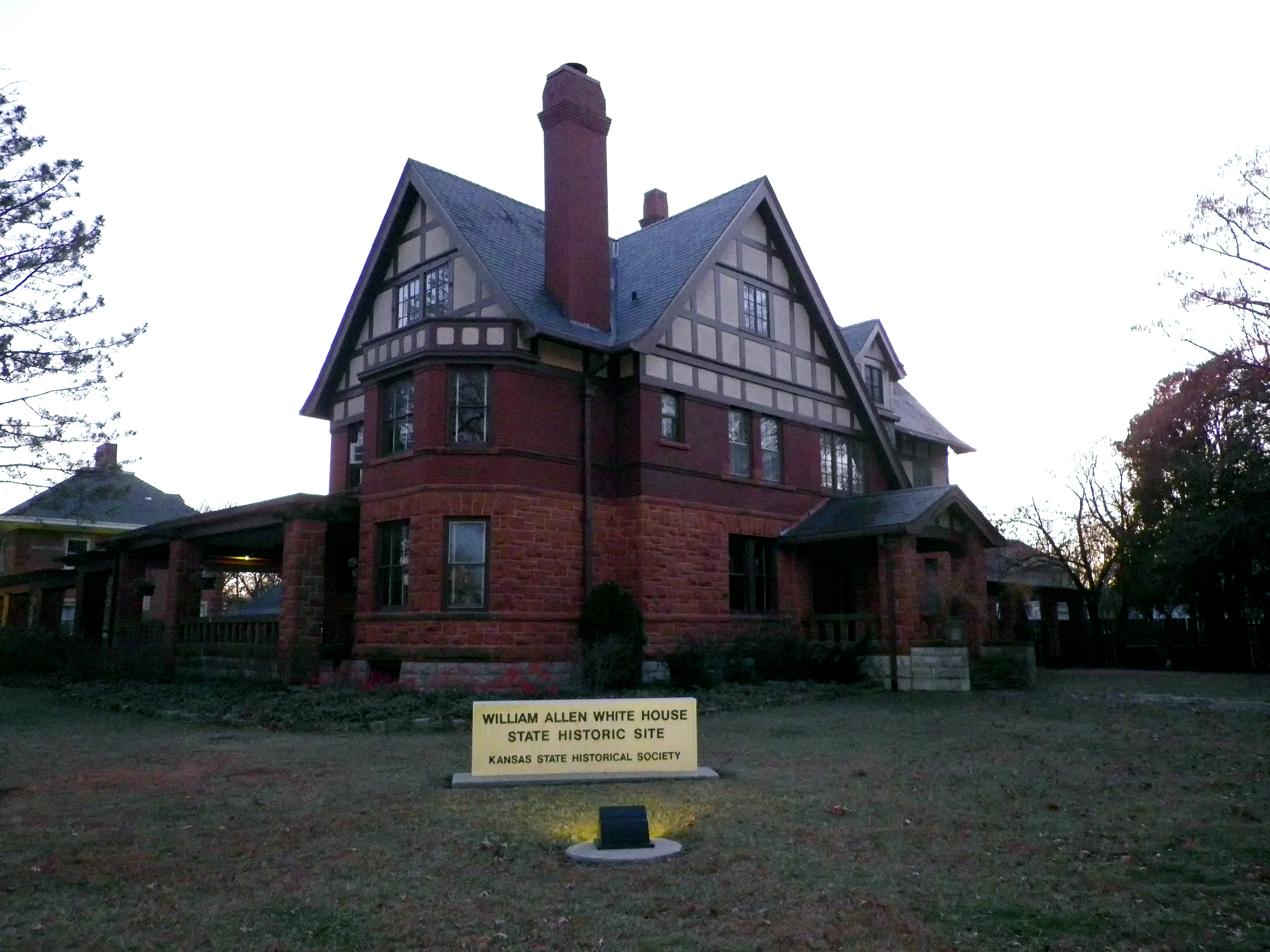
The William Allen White House, a Kansas state historic site

- Henry J. Allen
- Dorothy Canfield
- Calvin Coolidge
- Douglas Fairbanks
- Edna Ferber
- Herbert Hoover
- Theodore Roosevelt
- Frances Louise Tracy and Anne Morgan, the wife and daughter, respectively, of J.P. Morgan

== Posthumous honors ==
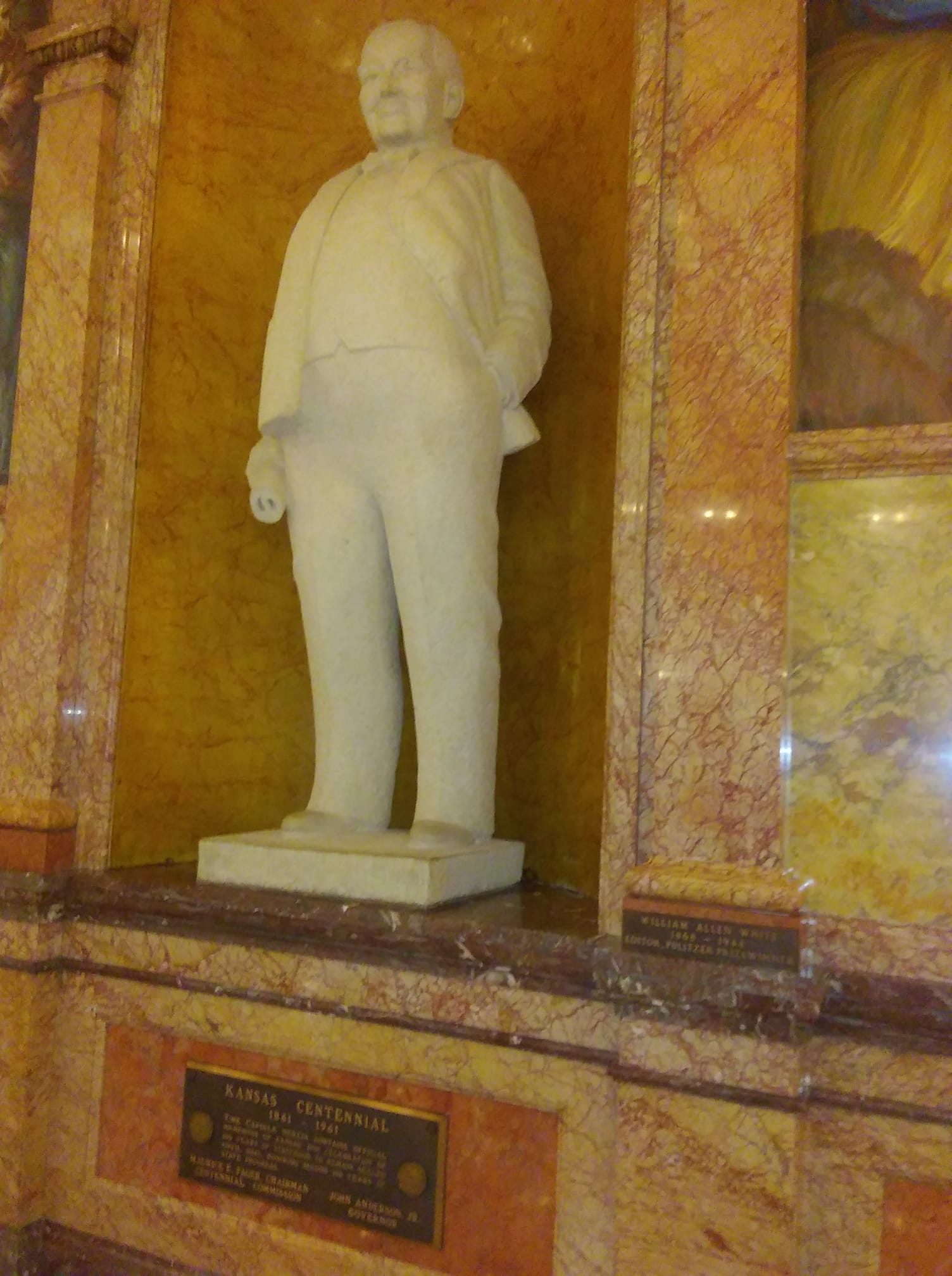
White statue in the state capitol in Topeka, Kansas

Life described White:

He is the small-town boy who made good at home. To the small-town man who envies the glamour of the city, he is living assurance that small-town life may be preferable. To the city man who looks back with nostalgia on a small-town youth, he is a living symbol of small-town simplicity and kindliness and common sense.

The city of Emporia raised $25,000 in war bonds during World War II and were granted naming rights for a B-29 bomber in early 1945. They unsurprisingly chose to name it after their most famous citizen, William Allen White. This bomber was sent with a crew of men to the island of Tinian in the South Pacific and was part of the same bomber squadron that the Enola Gay was in.

During World War II, the William Allen White Liberty ship was launched from Richmond, California on May 8, 1944.

His autobiography, which was published posthumously in 1946, won the 1947 Pulitzer Prize for Biography or Autobiography.

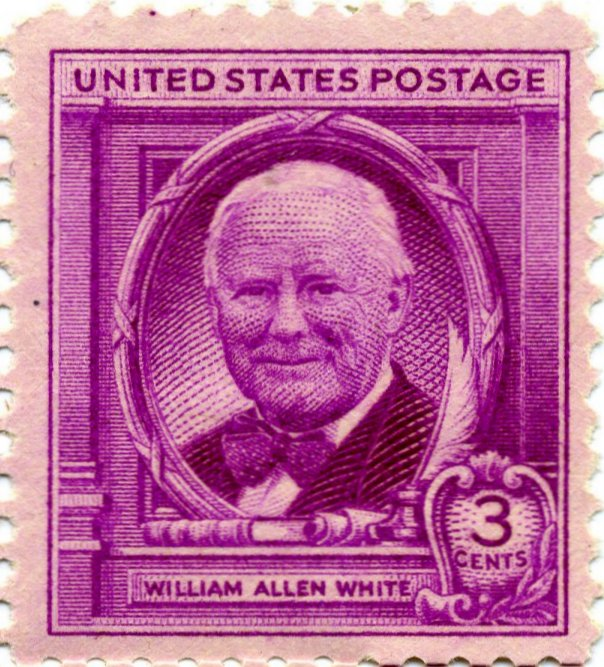
US postage stamp, 1948

In 1948 a 3¢ stamp was issued in his honor by the U.S. Postal Service.

The University of Kansas Journalism School is named for him.

The library building at Emporia State University is named the William Allen White Library.

There are also two awards the William Allen White Foundation has created: the William Allen White Award for outstanding journalistic merit and the Children's Book Award.

The town of Emporia honors him to this day with city limits signs on I-35, US-50, and K-99 announcing "Home of William Allen White."

A photograph of White has been used by the band They Might Be Giants in stagecraft and music videos throughout their entire career.

== Quotations ==
From editorial "Mary White":

A rift in the clouds in a gray day threw a shaft of sunlight upon her coffin as her nervous, energetic little body sank to its last sleep. But the soul of her, the glowing, gorgeous, fervent soul of her, surely was flaming in eager joy upon some other dawn.

From editorial "Student Riots", The Emporia Gazette, April 8, 1932:

As a matter of fact student riots of one sort or another, protests against the order that is, kicks against college and university management indicate a healthy growth and a normal functioning of the academic mind. Youth should be radical. Youth should demand change in the world. Youth should not accept the old order if the world is to move on. But the old orders should not be moved easily—certainly not at the mere whim or behest of youth. There must be clash and if youth hasn't enough force or fervor to produce the clash the world grows stale and stagnant and sour in decay. If our colleges and universities do not breed men who riot, who rebel, who attack life with all their youthful vim and vigor, then there is something wrong with our colleges. The more riots that come on college campuses, the better world for tomorrow.

From a 1933 editorial about the futility of war (referring to World War I):

The boys who died just went out and died. To their own souls' glory of course -- but what else? ... Yet the next war will see the same hurrah and the same bowwow of the big dogs to get the little dogs to go out and follow the blood scent and get their entrails tangled in the barbed wire.

From an editorial published in February 1943, shortly after President Franklin D. Roosevelt returned from the Casablanca Conference with Winston Churchill:

Biting good Republican nails, we're compelled to say that Franklin Roosevelt is the most unaccountable president the United States has ever seen; he has seen more of this amazing world than Marco Polo. Well, damn your smiling old picture, here it is: We who hate your gaudy guts salute you."

From a March 20, 1899 editorial, The Emporia Gazette:

Riots against the police are occurring in Havana. They will keep occurring. No Latin country governs itself. Self-government is the most difficult thing in the world for a people to accomplish. It is not a matter that a nation acquires by adopting a set of laws. Only Anglo-Saxons can govern themselves. The Cubans will need a despotic government for many years to restrain anarchy until Cuba is filled with Yankees. Uncle Sam, the First, will have to govern Cuba as Alphonso, the Thirteenth, governed it if there is any peace in the island at all. The Cubans are not and, of right, ought not to be free. To say that they are, or that they should be, is folly. Riot will follow riot. Anarchy will rise to be crushed. And unrest will prevail until the Yankee takes possession of the land. Then the Cubans will be an inferior—if not a servile—race. Then there will be peace in the land. Then will Cuba be free. It is the Anglo-Saxon's manifest destiny to go forth in the world as a world conqueror. He will take possession of all the islands of the sea. He will exterminate the peoples he cannot subjugate. That is what fate holds for the chosen people. It is so written. Those who would protest, will find their objections overruled. It is to be.

== Published works ==
White had 22 works published throughout his life. Many of these works were collections of short stories, magazine articles, or speeches he gave throughout his long career.

=== Poetry ===
- Rhymes by Two Friends, with Albert Bigelow Paine (1893)

=== Biographies ===
- Woodrow Wilson, The Man, His Times, and His Tasks (1924)
- Calvin Coolidge, The Man Who is President (1925)
- Masks in a Pageant (1928); profiles presidents from McKinley to Wilson
- A Puritan in Babylon: The Story of Calvin Coolidge (1938)
- The Autobiography of William Allen White (1946)

=== Fiction ===
- The Real Issue: A Book of Kansas Stories (1896)
- The Court of Boyville (1899)
- Stratagems and Spoils: Stories of Love and Politics (1901)
- In Our Town (1906)
- A Certain Rich Man (1909)
- God's Puppets (1916)
- The Martial Adventures of Henry & Me (1918)
- In the Heart of a Fool (1918)

=== Political and social commentary ===
- The Old Order Changeth: A View of American Democracy (1910)
- Politics: The Citizen's Business (1924)
- Some Cycles of Cathay (1925)
- Boys-Then and Now (1926)
- What It's All About: Being A Reporter's Story of the Early Campaign of 1936 (1936)
- Forty Years on Main Street (1937)
- The Changing West: An Economic Theory About Our Golden Age (1939)

== See also ==
- Theodore Roosevelt
- Progressive Party (United States, 1912)
- William Lindsay White
- Emporia Gazette
- Pulitzer Prize
- Great Railroad Strike of 1922
- William Allen White Cabins, the Whites' summer retreat, now in Rocky Mountain National Park and listed in the National Register of Historic Places

== Notes ==
Awards and achievements
Preceded by Hiram Johnson	Cover of Time Magazine; 6 October 1924	Succeeded by Glenn H. Curtiss
Preceded by Frank M. O'Brien	Pulitzer Prize for Editorial Writing; 1923	Succeeded by Boston Herald
