= Joseph K. Hudson =

US Army brigadier general (1840–1907)

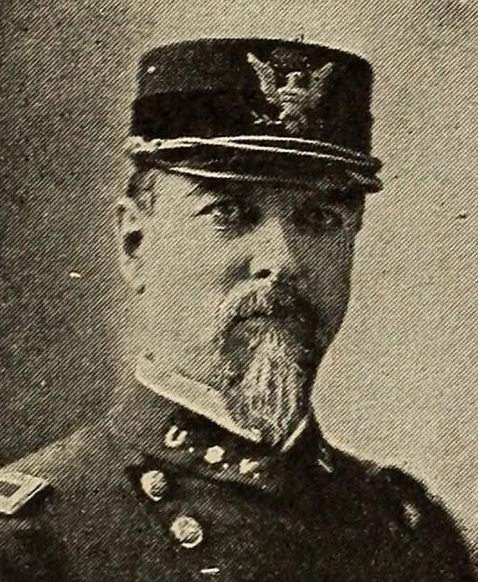
- Hudson as a brigadier general in 1898
- Born: 4 May 1840; Carrollton, Ohio, US
- Died: 5 May 1907 (aged 67); Topeka, Kansas, US
- Burial place: Topeka Cemetery, Topeka, Kansas, US
- Spouse: Mary Worrall Smith (m. 1863–1907)
- Children: 4
- Relatives: Donald Hudson (grandson)
- Military career
- Allegiance: Union (American Civil War); United States
- Service: Union Army; United States Army
- Service years: 1861–1865 (Union Army); 1898 (US Army)
- Rank: Brigadier General
- Unit: US Army Infantry Branch
- Commands: 2nd Brigade, 2nd Division, Fourth Army Corps
- Wars: American Civil War; United States Army
- Other work: Newspaper publisher Member, Kansas House of Representatives

Signature
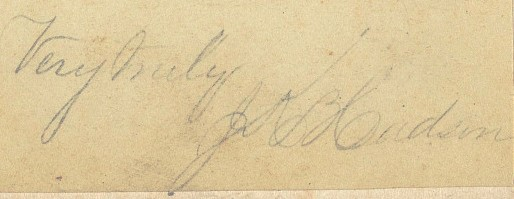

Joseph K. Hudson (4 May 1840 – 5 May 1907) was an American newspaper publisher, politician, and military officer from Kansas. A Union Army veteran of the American Civil War, he was recalled to service for the Spanish–American War and served as a brigadier general of United States Volunteers.

A native of Carrollton, Ohio and the son of a prominent abolitionist, Hudson moved to Kansas as a teenager and became active in the anti-slavery movement. At the start of the American Civil War, he joined Company E, 3rd Kansas Infantry Regiment. When his regiment was combined with another to form the 10th Kansas Infantry Regiment, he was commissioned as a first lieutenant in the new regiment's Company C. He served in the Trans-Mississippi theater until December 1863, when he was commissioned as a major in the 63rd Regiment of United States Colored Troops. He took part in the Red River campaign and served until the end of the war.

After his military service, Hudson farmed and raised livestock on a farm near Leavenworth. In 1871, he served a term in the Kansas House of Representatives. In 1873, he purchased a Leavenworth newspaper, which he subsequently moved to Topeka and renamed the Topeka Capital. He published the Capital until 1895 and served as the state printer from 1895 to 1897. In 1898, the US Army temporarily expanded during the Spanish–American War and Hudson was commissioned as a brigadier general of United States Volunteers. He commanded a brigade in Florida and Alabama, but the war ended before it embarked for Cuba, and he was discharged at the end of 1898. Hudson died in Topeka on 5 May 1907. He was buried at Topeka Cemetery.

== Early life ==
Joseph Kennedy Hudson was born in Carrollton, Ohio on 4 May 1840, the son of John F. Hudson and Rebecca (Rothacker) Hudson. John Hudson was prominent in the abolitionist movement and was the publisher of The Anti-Slavery Bugle, the newspaper of the Western Anti-Slavery Society. Joseph Hudson was raised and educated in Salem, Ohio. While a teenager, he joined the John Brown League, a semi-secret organization which worked to overthrow slavery. After the start of the American Civil War in 1861, he moved to Kansas to join the brigade of volunteers led by abolitionist Jim Lane.

== Start of career ==
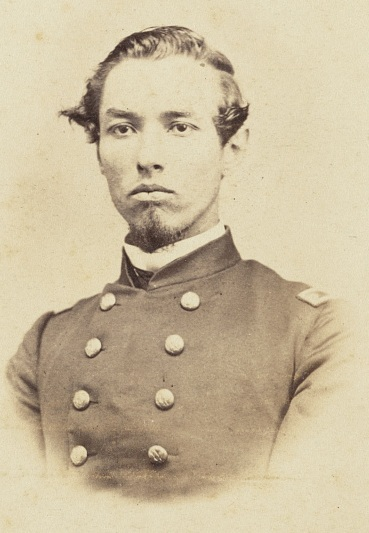
Hudson as a major in 1864

In July 1861, Hudson enlisted as a private in the Union Army's Company E, 3rd Kansas Infantry Regiment, a unit of Lane's brigade, and he was subsequently appointed his company's orderly sergeant. In April 1862, Hudson's 3rd Kansas and the 4th Kansas Infantry Regiment were combined to create the 10th Kansas Infantry Regiment. Hudson was commissioned a first lieutenant in the 10th Kansas Infantry's Company C, which was part of Lane's brigade. Lane's command was part of the Union Army's Army of the Frontier, which served in the Trans-Mississippi theater, including engagements in Kansas, Arkansas, and Indian Territory. When 10th Kansas Infantry commander William Weer assumed command of the Army of the Frontier's 2nd Brigade, 1st Division, Hudson acted as his adjutant.

In 1863, Hudson was appointed adjutant of the 1st Division's 1st Brigade. He subsequently served on the staff of Brigadier General Thomas Alfred Davies, commander of the District of North Kansas, which was followed by appointment to the staff of Major General John Schofield, commander of the Department of the Missouri. In December 1863, Hudson was commissioned as a major in the 63rd Regiment of United States Colored Troops. He served with his regiment in the Red River campaign during several battles in Louisiana and Texas, including the May 1865 Battle of Palmito Ranch, which is regarded by many historians as the final armed engagement of the war. Near the end of his term of service, Hudson served on the staff of Egbert B. Brown, commander of the District of Rolla. He was discharged from the army in July 1865.

== Continued career ==
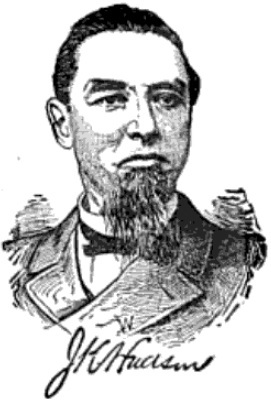
From Volume I of 1898's National Cyclopedia of American Biography

After his wartime service, Hudson intended to study law and become an attorney in Kansas City, Missouri. He subsequently decided on a career in agriculture and settled near Leavenworth, Kansas, where he farmed and raised cattle and horses. A Republican, his activities in politics and government included service as a board of regents member of the Kansas State Agricultural College. In 1871, he served a term in the Kansas House of Representatives. In 1873, Hudson purchased a newspaper, the Kansas Farmer of Leavenworth. Two years later, he relocated the paper to Topeka and renamed it the Topeka Capital. In 1880 and 1881, Hudson served as secretary of the Kansas Department of Agriculture. He published the Capital until 1895 and made it a force in statewide politics; he used the editorial pages to advocate for Republican causes, most notably the prohibition of alcohol. Indebtedness led to the Capital's receivership and reorganization in 1895 and 1896; Hudson then concentrated his time and effort on managing his investments in mining and land speculation. In January 1895, the state legislature elected Hudson to the state printer's office, and he served in this position for two years.

With the outbreak of the Spanish–American War in April 1898, the federal government expanded the army by enlisting United States Volunteers. This effort included commissions for prominent individuals who could aid in recruiting soldiers and organizing units; Kansas political and business leaders lobbied for Hudson, who received an appointment as a brigadier general. Hudson was assigned to command 2nd Brigade, 2nd Division, Fourth Army Corps, with regular army officer William J. Glasgow as his aide-de-camp. Hudson led his command during mobilization and training in Tampa, Florida and Huntsville, Alabama. The war ended before his unit was scheduled to embark for Cuba, and he was discharged in November 1898.

In 1899, Hudson regained control of the Topeka Capital. Ownership later passed to Arthur Capper. Hudson was a member of the Grand Army of the Republic and the Military Order of the Loyal Legion of the United States. He died in Topeka on 5 May 1907. He was buried at Topeka Cemetery in Topeka.
