= 5th Indiana Volunteers =

5th Indiana Volunteers 5th Indiana Volunteer Infantry Regiment
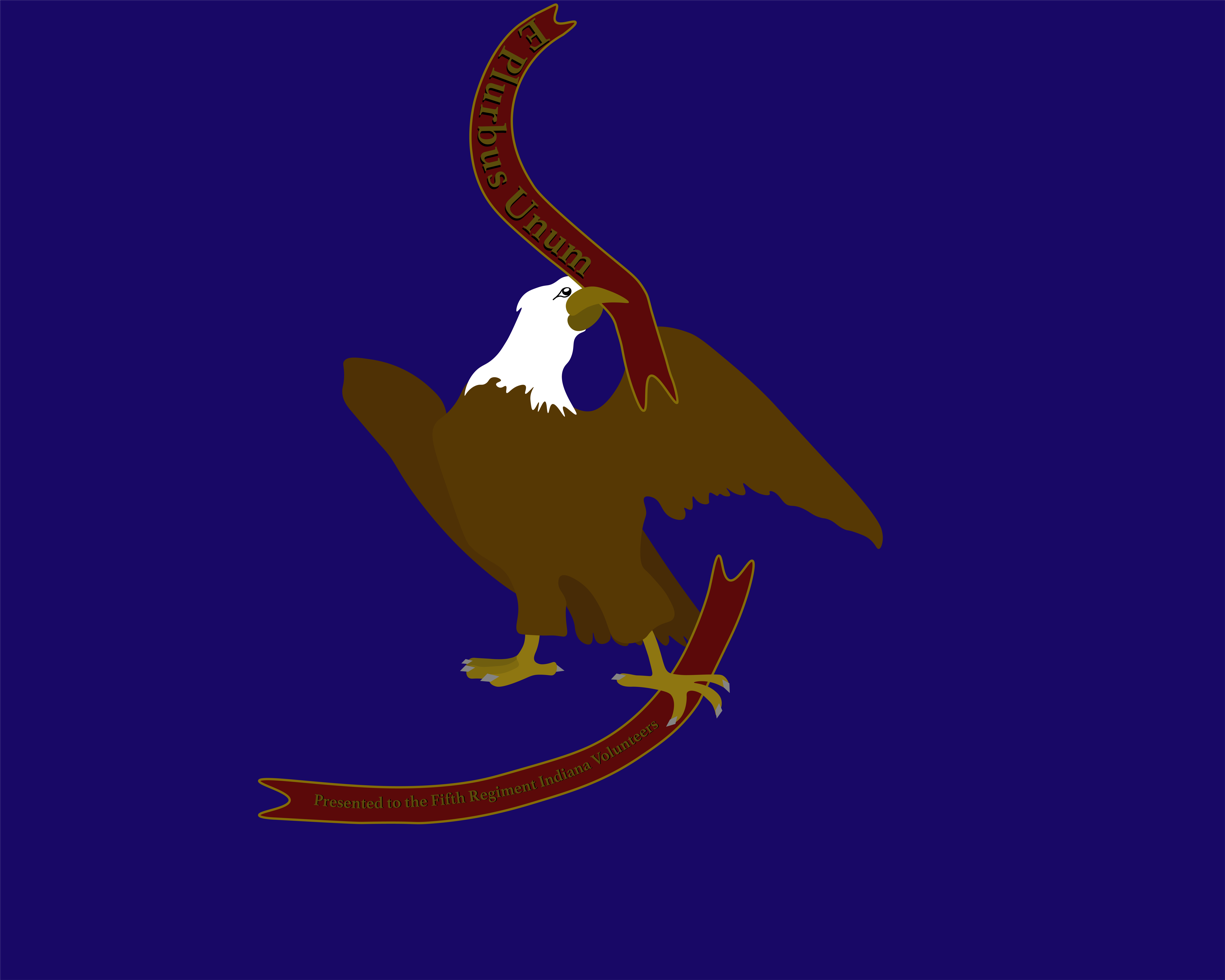
- Artistic rendition of the Regimental flag of the 5th Indiana Volunteers (1848)
- Active: October 14, 1847 – July 28, 1848
- Disbanded: July 28, 1848
- Country: United States
- Allegiance: Indiana
- Branch: United States Volunteers
- Type: Infantry
- Size: 973
- Engagements: Mexican-American War

Commanders
- Colonel: James Henry Lane
- Notable commanders: Mahlon Dickerson Manson; John McDougal

The 5th Indiana Volunteers, also known as the 5th Regiment Indiana Volunteer Infantry, was an infantry regiment that participated in the Mexican–American War. The unit was formed and commanded by future Kansas Senator James Henry Lane who had recently returned from commanding the 3rd Indiana Volunteer Infantry. The regiment remained in Mexico for the duration of the war.

== Organization ==
The regiment was organized in Madison, Indiana, on October 14, 1847. In total the regiment recruited some 973 men from the state of Indiana, the regiment was organized as follows during its muster:

Original Organization of Regiment in October 1847
Company	Earliest Moniker	Primary Place of Recruitment	Earliest Captain
A	The Indiana Guards	Vernon and Jennings County	Horace Hull
B	Rough and Ready Guards	Charlestown and Clark County	George Greene
C	The Covington Guards	Madison and Jefferson County	Robert M. Evans
D	The Hancock boys (B'hoys)	Greenfield and Hancock County	Aaron C. Gibbs
E	Shelbyville Hards	Shelbyville and Shelby County	Samuel McKinsey
F	Centre Guards	Madison and Jefferson County	John McDougal
G	Grabbers No. 2	Lawrenceburg and Dearborn County	Aaron C. Gibbs
H	Washington Guards	Madison and Jefferson County	Ebenezer Cary
I	Montgomery Boys	Crawfordsville and Montgomery County	Allen May
K	Wayne Guards	Madison and Jefferson County	David W. Lewis

== Service ==
The regiment elected James Henry Lane as the regiments Colonel, Allen May as Lieutenant Colonel, John M. Myers as Major, James Baker as Regimental Quartermaster, James S. Athon as Surgeon, and John M. Lord as the regiment's Adjutant. Lane had originally entered the army as Captain of the "Dearborn Volunteers" and had seen service in the 3rd Indiana Volunteer Infantry Regiment before being appointed to the 5th Regiment.

In the meantime the regiment was issued military uniforms. According to the book Hazzard's History of Henry County: 1822–1906 by George Hazzard, Hazzard describes the uniforms as "dark blue cloth, something like those worn in the late war, and we wore caps. The light blue overcoats worn during the late war, were very similar to those issued to our regiment". One article from the New Albany, Indiana newspaper, the New Albany Democrat from October 15, 1857, describes the regiment as follows:

"Nine companies have arrived and been mustered into the service. The last one, Captain Gary's company from Grant County, was mustered in last evening. All the companies are now in camp and comprise in all something like 700 men, and recruiting for the various companies is going on rapidly. Every one about the camp is in the highest spirits. Every volunteer is elated with the hope of soon leaving that they may aid their fellow soldiers in subduing our treacherous and obstinate foe and share in the revels in the halls of the Montezumas — that all absorbing desire of the volunteer that is now being realized in the City of the Aztecs. The clothing of the different companies is going on rapidly and will be completed by the last of next week at farthest."

The regiment remained at Marion until Sunday October 31, 1847, when it was ordered to New Orleans. Three steamboats, the Ne Plus Ultra, the Phoenix, and the Wave transported the regiment to Louisiana. Near the middle of November 1847, the regiment reached San Juan de Ulúa in Veracruz. The Fifth regiment had been assigned to a brigade with the 3rd Tennessee Regiment, commanded by then Colonel Benjamin F. Cheatham. The 5th Indiana and 3rd Tennessee marched on foot from Veracruz to Xalapa, from Xalapa the unit continued to Perote until it finally arrived in Puebla shortly after the Siege of Puebla. The regiment was garrisoned for one month in Mexico City where the regiments temporary barracks were at the Convento de Santa Clara. The regiment was eventually ordered to Molino del Rey, five miles east of the capital and near the Chapultepec Castle where it was eventually garrisoned for six weeks. By August 24, 1847, an armistice had been agreed upon to cease fighting and the regiment was thence moved to San Agustin where it was transferred to a different brigade alongside the 4th Tennessee Volunteers commanded by then Colonel Richard Waterhouse. On February 2, 1848, the Treaty of Guadalupe Hidalgo was signed by Nicholas P. Trist, the peace commissioner on behalf of the United States. The regiment eventually received orders to return to Veracruz where it disembarked back to New Orleans. On July 25, 1848, the regiment reached Madison, Indiana and was later mustered out of federal service on July 28, 1848. The regiment did not fight in any major battles during the course of the Mexican-American War. Despite this, the regiment lost a great number of men due to disease, heat stroke, and dysentery. For example, Company H had lost a total of 21 men, all to disease.

== Notable people ==
- James "Jim" Henry Lane: Served as the Colonel of the regiment. Lane would later become a famous Republican politician and Jayhawker during the Bleeding Kansas period. During the American Civil War Lane served as the Brigadier-General of the so-called "Kansas Brigade" which consisted of volunteers of the 3rd Kansas Infantry Regiment, the 4th Kansas Infantry Regiment, and the 5th Kansas Infantry Regiment.
- Mahlon Dickerson Manson: Served as the latter Captain of Company I. Manson later became a member of the United States Congress and a general in the American Civil War.
- John McDougal: Served as the Captain of Company F. McDougal was later elected as the 2nd Governor of California and served as the 1st Lieutenant Governor of California.
