= List of battles fought in Oklahoma =

This is an incomplete list of military and other armed confrontations that have occurred within the boundaries of the modern US State of Oklahoma since European contact. The region was part of the Viceroyalty of New Spain from 1535 to 1679, New France from 1679 to 1803, and part of the United States of America 1803–present.

The Plains Indian Wars directly affected the region during westward expansion, as did the American Civil War.

== Battles ==
| Name | Date | Location | War | Campaign | Dead | Belligerents |
|---|---|---|---|---|---|---|
| Battle of the Twin Villages | 1759 | uncertain | | | 114 | Kingdom of New Spain vs. Wichita |
| Battle of Claremore Mound | June 1817 | modern Rogers County | | | 38+ | Cherokee vs. Osage |
| Cutthroat Gap Massacre | Spring 1833 | modern Kiowa County | | | 150 | Osage vs. Kiowa |
| Battle of Wolf Creek | June 1838 | modern Ellis County | | | 72 | Cheyenne & Arapaho vs. Kiowa, Comanche, & Apache |
| Battle of Little Robe Creek | May 12, 1858 | modern Ellis County | Plains Indian Wars | Antelope Hills Expedition | 78 | Comanche vs. Texas Rangers |
| Battle of the Wichita Village | October 1, 1858 | near modern Rush Springs | Plains Indian Wars | Wichita Expedition | 75 | Comanche vs. United States |
| Battle of Round Mountain | November 19, 1861 | unknown / location disputed | American Civil War | Trail of Blood on Ice | 6+ | Creek & Seminole vs. Confederate States of America |
| Battle of Chusto-Talasah | December 9, 1861 | near modern Tulsa | American Civil War | Trail of Blood on Ice | 15+ | Creek & Seminole vs. Confederate States of America |
| Battle of Chustenahlah | December 26, 1861 | near modern Skiatook | American Civil War | Trail of Blood on Ice | 9+ | Creek & Seminole vs. Confederate States of America |
| Battle of Locust Grove | July 3, 1862 | near present day Locust Grove | American Civil War | Operations to Control Indian Territory | 103 | United States vs. Confederate States of America |
| Battle of Old Fort Wayne | October 22, 1862 | Fort Wayne | American Civil War | Operations North of Boston Mountains (1862) | 64+ | United States vs. Confederate States of America |
| Tonkawa Massacre | October 24, 1862 | modern Caddo County | American Civil War | | 137–150 | Osage vs Tonkawa |
| Battle of Cabin Creek | July 1–2, 1863 | modern Mayes County | American Civil War | Operations to Control Indian Territory | 88 | United States vs. Confederate States of America |
| Battle of Honey Springs | July 17, 1863 | modern Muskogee County & McIntosh County | American Civil War | Operations to Control Indian Territory | 167 | United States vs. Confederate States of America |
| Battle of Perryville | August 23, 1863 | near modern Chambers | American Civil War | Operations to Control Indian Territory | 49 | Confederate States of America vs. United States |
| Battle of Middle Boggy Depot | February 13, 1864 | near modern Allen | American Civil War | Operations to Control Indian Territory | 47 | United States vs. Confederate States of America |
| Ambush of the steamboat J. R. Williams | June 15, 1864 | near modern Tamaha | American Civil War | Operations to Control Indian Territory | 4 | United States vs. Confederate States of America |
| Second Battle of Cabin Creek | September 19, 1864 | near modern Pensacola | American Civil War | Operations to Control Indian Territory | 29 | Confederate States of America vs. United States |
| Battle of Washita River | November 27, 1868 | near modern Cheyenne | Plains Indian Wars | Comanche Campaign | 171+ | United States vs. Cheyenne |
| Battle of Soldier Spring | December 25, 1868 | modern Greer County & modern Kiowa County | Plains Indian Wars | Canadian River Expedition | 26 | Comanche & Kiowa vs 6th U.S. Cavalry & 37th U.S. Infantry |
| Goingsnake Massacre | April 15, 1872 | modern Adair County | | | 11 | U.S. Marshals vs. Cherokee |
| Sand Hill Fight | April 6, 1875 | modern Canadian County | Plains Indian Wars | Red River War | | Cheyenne vs. United States |
| Enid-Pond Creek Railroad War | 1893–1894 | modern Grant and Garfield Counties | Railroad Wars | | 0 | Citizens vs. Rock Island Railroad |
| Crazy Snake Rebellion | March 1909 | Okmulgee County | | | 3 | Creek Indians Snake Government vs. Local citizens, 8th Cavalry Regiment U.S. Army, 1st Regiment Oklahoma National Guard |
| Green Corn Rebellion | August 2–3, 1917 | Pontotoc County | World War I | | 3 | Tenant farmers vs. Local authorities |
| Tulsa Race Massacre | May 31 – June 1, 1921 | Tulsa County | | | 36 (1921 total); 39 (1921 estimate by activist Walter White); 75–100 to 150–300 (2001 commission estimate) | White citizens vs. Black citizens |
| Red River Bridge War | July 3 – September 7, 1931 | Bryan County, Oklahoma and Grayson County, Texas | | | 0 | Oklahoma Army National Guard vs. Texas Ranger Division |

== See also ==
- History of Oklahoma
- Plains Indians Wars
- Indian Territory in the American Civil War
