= William Weer =

American lawyer

- Military career
- Allegiance: United States of America; Union
- Branch: United States Army; Union Army
- Service years: 1861–1864
- Rank: Brigadier General, Kansas Militia; Colonel, U.S.V.
- Commands: 4th Kansas Volunteer Infantry; 10th Kansas Infantry
- Conflicts: American Civil War; Battle of Locust Grove; Sacking of Osceola; First Battle of Newtonia; Battle of Old Fort Wayne; Battle of Cane Hill; Battle of Prairie Grove; Battle of Westport
- Other work: Kansas Attorney General

William Weer (a.k.a. William A. Weer and William Weir) was a lawyer, attorney general for Kansas and an officer in the Union Army during the American Civil War. He is notable for his service in the Trans-Mississippi Theater early in the war and later for being dismissed from the army following a court-martial.

== Biography ==
During the time Weer worked as a lawyer, he served as legal counsel for the Wyandott Reservation in Kansas. In 1857 Weer became the second person to hold to position of attorney general in the territory of Kansas. He held that post from 1857 to 1858. He was also active in the Kansas State Militia and became a brigadier general of militia in 1861.

On June 29, 1861, Weer was appointed colonel of the 4th Kansas Volunteer Infantry intended to serve in Jim Lane's "Kansas Brigade". (Note: Lane was a Kansas State Senator, a strong opponent of slavery, and said to be a major leader of the Jayhawkers) Before the regiment was fully up to strength, General James G. Blunt chose Weer, then the senior colonel at Baxter Springs, Kansas, to command the so-called "Indian Expedition" into the Indian Territory (present-day Oklahoma). A sizable force of 5,000 men was assembled and departed from Baxter Springs, Kansas. The expedition started well for the Union soldiers. Weer drove off pro-Confederate Cherokee forces, and defeated a force of Missourians under Colonel J. J. Clarkson at the battle of Locust Grove, capturing the Rebel's supply train. The expedition moved from Locust Grove to Flat Rock, 14 miles (23 km) from Fort Gibson. Low supplies, oppressive summer heat, and indecision on Weer's part led to extreme low morale among the Union troops. Weer's habitual drunkenness led to a mutiny among the other officers of the expedition, spearheaded by Colonel Frederick Salomon. Salomon placed Weer under arrest and assumed command of the expedition and withdrew to meet up with the supply trains.

While serving in Lane's Kansas Brigade, Weer was present during the Sacking of Osceola, and was one of the few Jayhawker officers present to favor sparing the town over burning it. His desire was overruled by Lane.

By 1862 the 4th Kansas Infantry had never been completed and the existing soldiers were merged with those of the 3rd Kansas Infantry and 5th Kansas Infantry to form the 10th Kansas Infantry. The 10th Kansas was mustered into service on April 3, 1862, with William F. Cloud (from the 2nd Kansas Cavalry) as colonel; Weer was ordered to take command of the regiment on June 1, 1862. His regiment was attached to the Department of Kansas and as ranking officer he assumed command of that department's 2nd Brigade. He led his brigade at the First Battle of Newtonia under the overall command of (now brigadier general) Frederick Salomon. In October 1862 Weer assumed command of the 2nd Brigade in Blunt's 1st Division of the Army of the Frontier. He commanded this brigade at the battles of Old Fort Wayne, Cane Hill and Prairie Grove. In Blunt's official report on the action at Prairie Grove he praised Weer for behaving with 'gallantry, leading men into the thickest of the fight'. Shortly after the battle, Blunt left Weer in command of the 1st Division, which he commanded for a short while into 1863.

Weer's main accomplishment was to recruit pro-Union Indians into military service, once this was approved by President Lincoln. He formed the Indian Home Guard into two regiments. The 1st Regiment, commanded by Colonel Robert Furnas, contained Creek and Seminole warriors, most of whom had fought under Chief Opothleyahola on the fight to Kansas in 1861. The 2nd Regiment, led by Colonel John Ritchie, contained an assortment of tribesmen, including Cherokees, Caddos, Delawares, Kaws, Kickapoos, Osages, Quapaws and Shawnees.

Weer's drinking again caused his removal from his field command and in 1863 he was assigned to a desk job as assistant adjutant general in St. Louis, Missouri. He served that post for a short time before he and his regiment were assigned to prison duty at Alton, Illinois. Weer and the 10th Kansas Volunteer Infantry took charge of Alton Prison and remained there for the rest of the Civil War. On April 8, 1864, Weer was arrested for misappropriation of prisoner funds, drunkenness and neglect of duty. He was convicted following a court martial and cashiered from the army on August 20, 1864. He briefly returned to military duty during Price's Missouri Raid as colonel of a Kansas militia regiment in 1864.
