= Topeka Cemetery =

Cemetery in Topeka, Kansas

Coordinates: 39.04055°N 95.65287°W

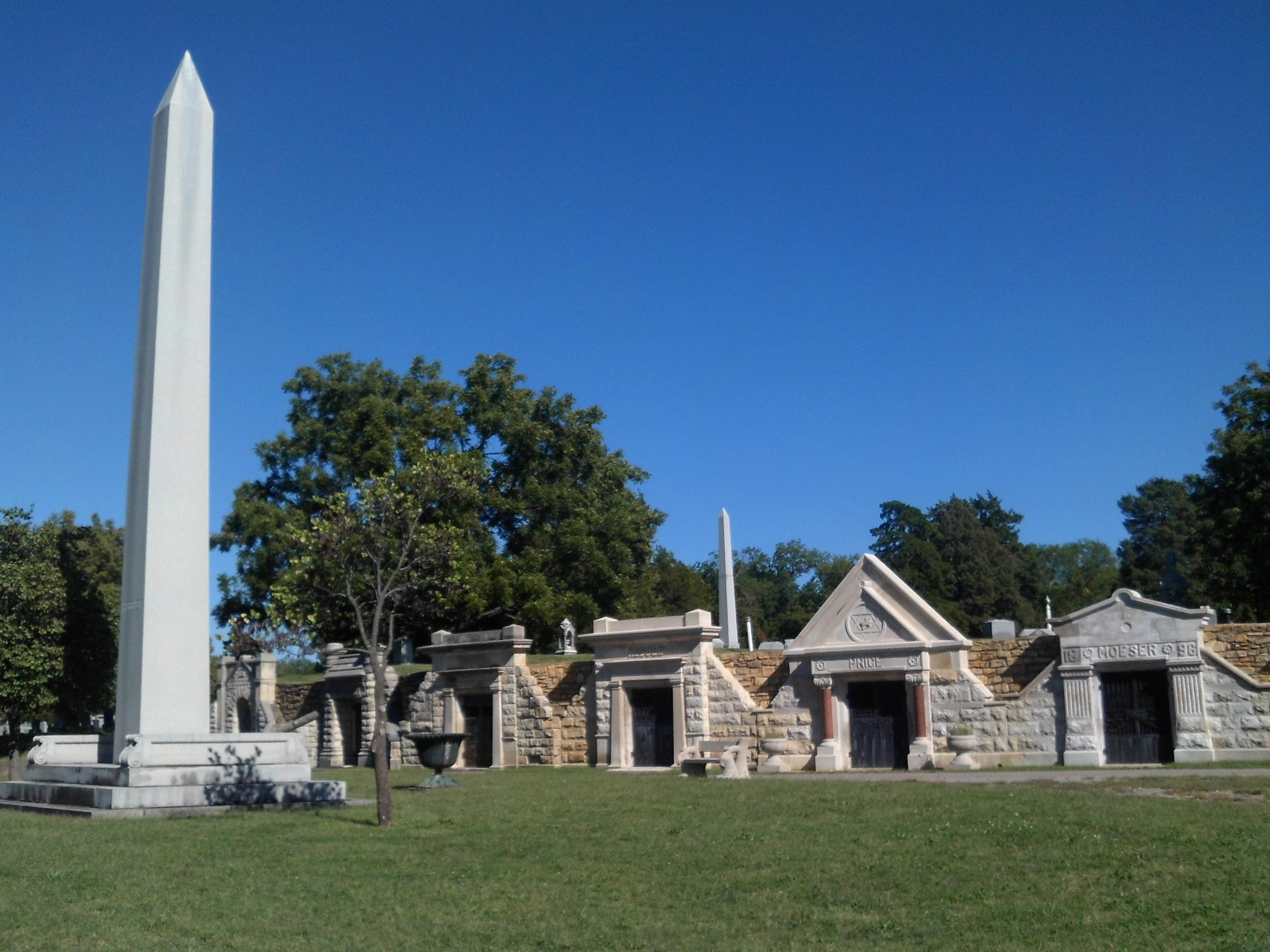
- Mausoleum Row
- Interactive map of Topeka Cemetery

Details
- Established: 1859
- Location: Topeka, Kansas
- Size: 80 acres (32 ha)
- No. of graves: Over 35,000

The Topeka Cemetery is a cemetery in Topeka, Kansas, United States. Established in 1859, it is the oldest chartered cemetery in the state of Kansas.

The 80-acre cemetery had more than 35,000 burials by 2019, including several prominent Kansans. Among them is Charles Curtis, 31st vice president of the United States under Herbert Hoover, the first person of Native descent to ever serve in the Executive Branch.

Also buried in Topeka Cemetery are many city and state founders such as Cyrus K. Holliday, first chairman of the Topeka Town Association and founder of the Atchison, Topeka & Santa Fe Railway; U.S. Sen. Arthur Capper, owner and publisher of The Topeka Daily Capital and later Topeka's first radio station, WIBW, shares a cemetery lot with Gov. Sam Crawford, his father-in-law. Capper served two terms as governor and five terms in the U.S. Senate. Joseph K. Hudson, publisher of the Capital and a brigadier general in the US Army, is also buried at Topeka Cemetery.

The cemetery is notable for its Mausoleum Row, which was placed on the National Register of Historic Places in 2001. The National Register Listing was enlarged in 2017 to include the entire cemetery.

Facing Mausoleum Row is the Hurley Monument, a memorial to Santa Fe general manager James Hurley, who died in 1910. The obelisk is 40 feet tall, the shaft a single piece. It was paid for by donations from Santa Fe employees across the nation.

In the cemetery's Grand Army of the Republic section stand a granite statue of a soldier, a tribute to the Topekans who died in the Battle of the Blue.

== See also ==
- List of burial places of presidents and vice presidents of the United States
