= Battle of Old Fort Wayne =

American Civil War battle

Coordinates: 36.368°N 94.6478°W

- Part of the Trans-Mississippi Theater of the American Civil War
Date	October 22, 1862
Location	Fort Wayne, Indian Territory (southeast of modern-day Sycamore, Oklahoma)
Result	Union victory

Belligerents
United States of America (Union)	(Confederate States of America) CSA (Confederacy)

Commanders and leaders
James G. Blunt	Douglas H. Cooper

Units involved
1st Division, Army of the Frontier	1st Indian Brigade

Strength
1 division	1 brigade

Casualties and losses
14	150

The Battle of Old Fort Wayne, also known as Maysville, Beattie's Prairie, or Beaty's Prairie, was an American Civil War battle on October 22, 1862, in Delaware County in what is now eastern Oklahoma.

Confederate Major General Thomas C. Hindman, commander of the Trans-Mississippi Department, had ordered his troops to put down bushwhackers in southwest Missouri and northwest Arkansas. At the time, Colonel Douglas H. Cooper and his Indian Brigade were stationed near Newtonia, Missouri, preparing to move to Springfield, Missouri. Hindman ordered Cooper to hold Newtonia until he could move other troops to surround Springfield. There were several skirmishes between Confederate and Union forces from September 30 and October 3. On October 4, Blunt's troops surrounded Newtonia on three sides. Cooper and his Indian forces beat a hasty retreat back to Indian Territory.

Brig. Gen. James G. Blunt and his Cherokee, Indiana, and Kansas troops from the First Division of the Army of the Frontier attacked Col. Douglas H. Cooper and his Confederate command on Beatties Prairie near Old Fort Wayne at 7:00 a.m. on October 22, 1862. The Confederates put up stiff resistance for a half-hour, but overwhelming numbers forced them to retire from the field in haste, leaving artillery and other equipment behind. This was a setback in the 1862 Confederate offensive that extended from the Tidewater in the East to the plains of the Indian Territory of the West.

== Opposing forces ==
=== Union ===
1st Division, Army of the Frontier – Brigadier General James G. Blunt.

- 1st Brigade (detachment)
  - 11th Kansas Infantry: Col. Thomas Ewing, Jr.
  - 2nd Indian Home Guard
- 2nd Brigade – Colonel William Weer
  - 6th Kansas Cavalry: Col. William R. Judson
  - 3rd Indian Home Guard: Col. William A. Phillips
  - 10th Kansas Infantry: Ltc Charles S. Hills
  - 1st Kansas Battery: Cpt Marcus D. Tenney
- 3rd Brigade – Colonel William F. Cloud
  - 2nd Kansas Cavalry: Ltc Owen Bassett
  - 2nd Indiana Light Artillery: Cpt. John Rabb
  - 1st Indian Home Guard: Ltc Stephen H. Wattles

=== Confederate ===
1st Brigade, 1st Division, I Corps, Army of the Trans-Mississippi– Colonel Douglas Cooper

  - 1st Choctaw/Chickasaw Regiment – Colonel S. N. Folsom
  - 2nd Cherokee Mounted Rifles – Colonel Stand Watie
  - 3rd Cherokee Regiment – Colonel Phillips
  - Buster's Battalion
  - Creek Battalion – Lieutenant Colonel Chilly McIntosh
  - Howell's Texas Battery

== Battle ==
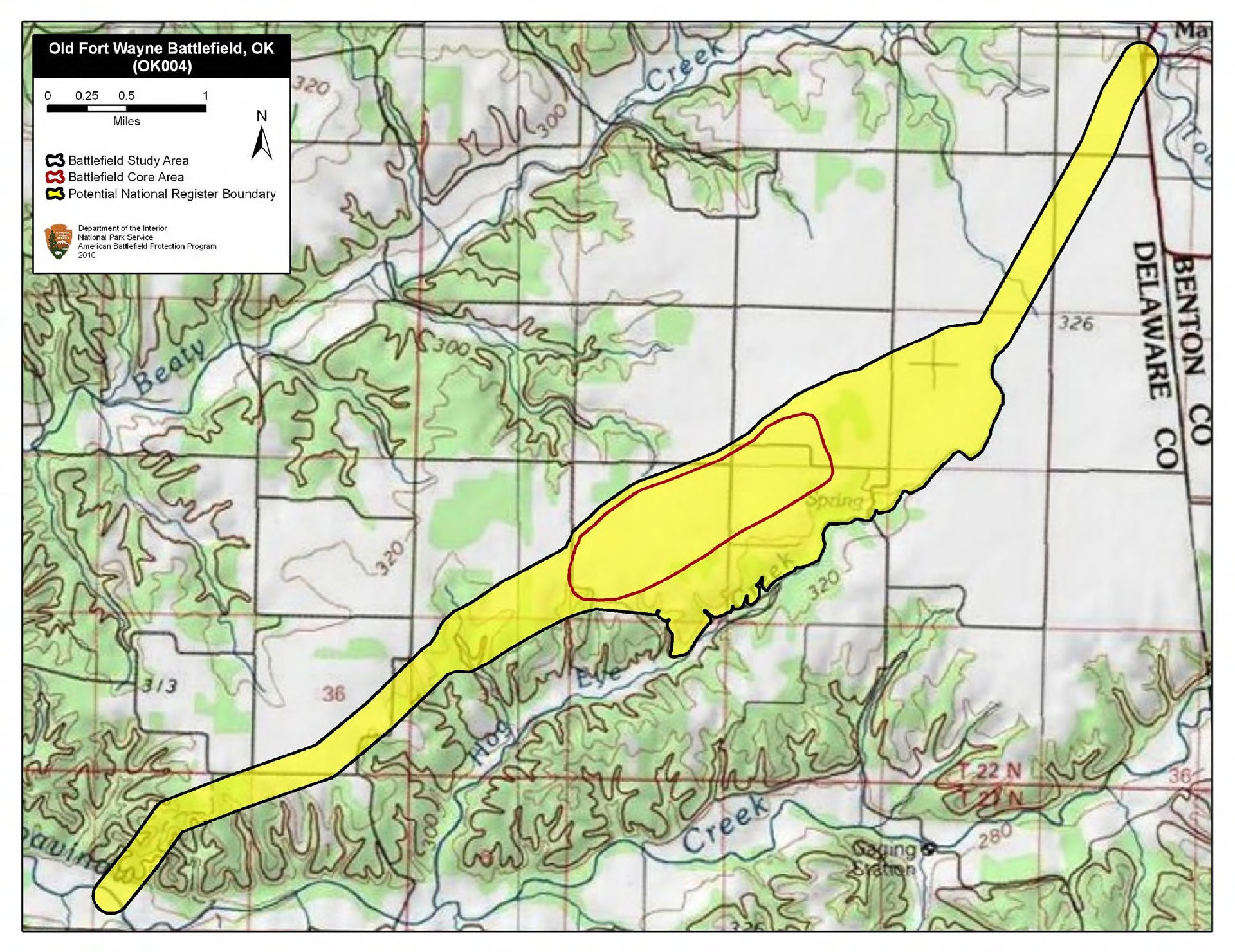
Map of Old Fort Wayne Battlefield core and study areas by the American Battlefield Protection Program.

In mid-July 1862, the Confederate Army started concentrating forces at Fayetteville, Arkansas, for a planned raid into Missouri. Concurrently, Douglas Cooper was to raid Kansas with his force of Choctaws, Chickasaws, and Lower Creeks. After weeks of recruiting to bolster their numbers, Cooper led his men through Indian Territory to Old Fort Wayne, an abandoned pre-war Federal military garrison on the southern edge of the sprawling Beatties Prairie. He positioned pickets 4 miles (6.4 km) to the north in Maysville, a small village directly on the Arkansas - Indian Territory boundary (23 miles (37 km) west of Bentonville). He was within supporting distance of John S. Marmaduke's small 4,000-man force of mostly Texans, which was positioned at Cross Hollows (near Lowell, Arkansas).

The nearest Federal troops were from John Schofield's Army of the Frontier, encamped at Pea Ridge, Arkansas. Word had been received that Cooper, accompanied by Stand Watie's two Cherokee Indian Regiments, was at Maysville, and scouts reported his total force to be about 7,000 men. James Blunt's First Division was relatively small (3,500 men), but was better trained and equipped than many of the recently raised Confederate units. At 7 p.m. on October 20, Blunt departed camp with the Second and Third Brigades. His command consisted of the 2nd Kansas Cavalry in the lead, followed by the 6th Kansas Cavalry, 10th Kansas Infantry and 11th Kansas Infantry, the 1st and 3rd Cherokee Regiments, the 1st Kansas Battery, 2nd Indiana Battery, and four mountain howitzers. After a night march southward, he arrived in Bentonville shortly after sunrise and paused until 5 p.m. to wait for his cumbersome supply wagons to arrive. He was anxious to surprise the Confederates, who were unaware of his advance. After a forced march of 25 miles (40 km) westward late on October 21, he stopped his column at 2 a.m. and allowed most of his men to rest.

However, he pushed forward the 2nd Kansas Cavalry, which struck the Confederates at 5 a.m. at Maysville, while the balance of the division was sleeping, nearly 7 miles (11 km) back. After driving in the pickets at Maysville, the Union cavalry followed them three and 1.5 miles (2.4 km) into the Indian Territory, where they encountered Cooper's main Confederate battleline, aligned along an east and west road, facing north, with a dense wood at their backs. Despite early Federal reports that he had as many as 7,000 men, Cooper in reality had roughly 1,500 men at his disposal, with Howell's Texas Battery of four artillery guns in the center of his three-quarter mile line. Blunt positioned howitzers in place to duel with the Confederate artillery, then deployed the 2nd Kansas, which soon pushed back Confederate skirmishers from a ridge fronting their main battleline. When the balance of Blunt's division arrived, he attacked, concentrating his men on the center of the thinly spread Confederate battleline. His howitzers silenced the lone enemy battery, and the Kansans and Cherokees opened a wide hole in Cooper's center. Within a half-hour, much of Cooper's ill-trained force was in full retreat (minus their artillery), with Blunt in pursuit for nearly 7 miles (11 km) before halting. Blunt lost 14 men; Cooper approximately 150, including a reported 50 dead who were buried on the battlefield.

The Confederates retreated nearly 70 miles (110 km) to Fort Gibson. The Union Army once again had undisputed possession of Indian Territory north of the Arkansas River. For his decisive victory, Blunt was appointed major general of volunteers.

The State of Arkansas erected a commemorative marker in Benton County at the northwest corner of state routes 43 and 72 in Maysville.

== See also ==
- Fort Wayne (Indian Territory)
- List of battles fought in Oklahoma
