= Cane Hill Battlefield =

- U.S. National Register of Historic Places
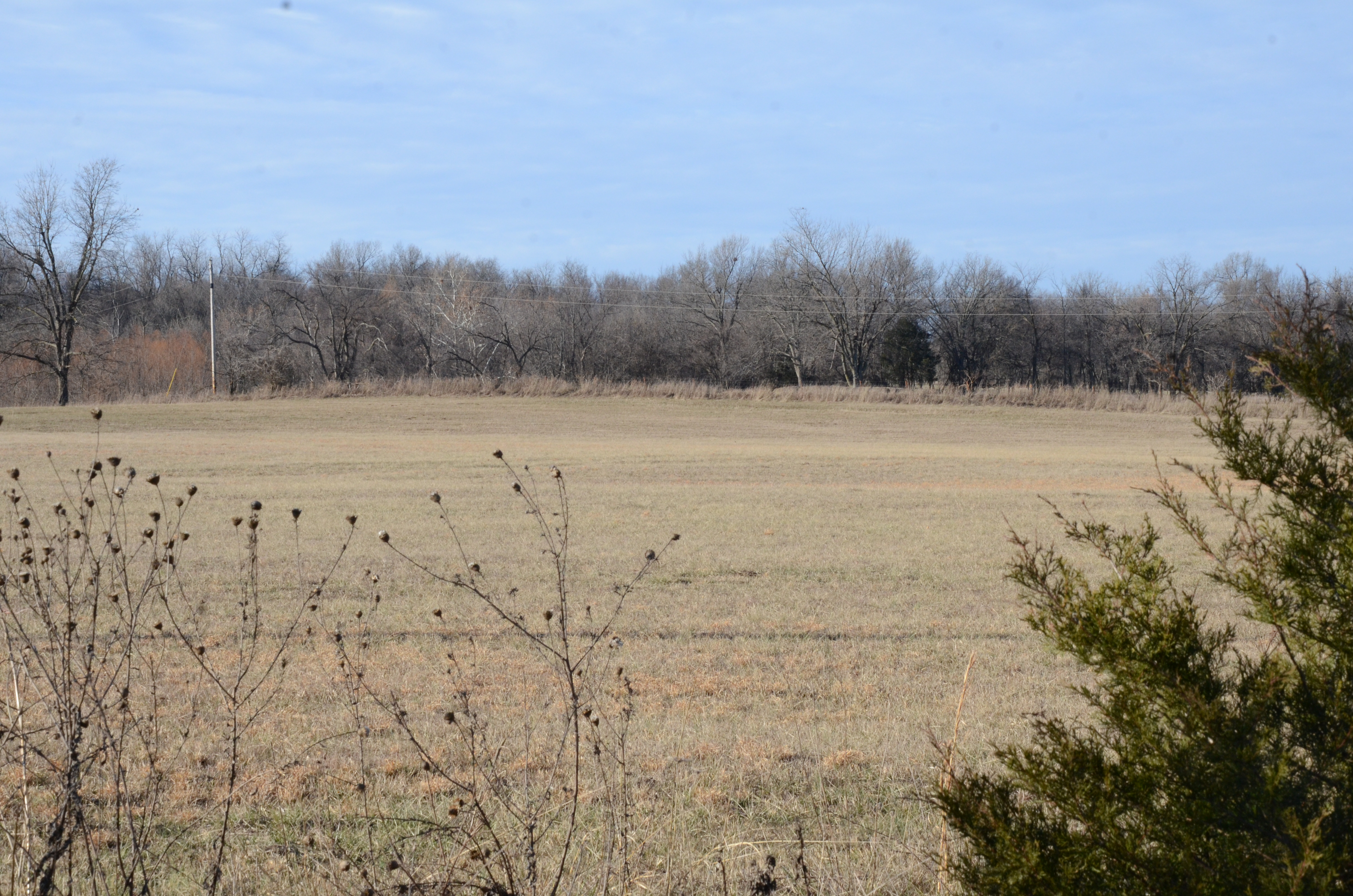

- Location within Arkansas Location within the United States
- Nearest city: Cane Hill, Arkansas
- Area: 6,000 acres (2,400 ha)
- Built: 1862
- NRHP reference No.: 94000132
- Added to NRHP: March 7, 1994

The Cane Hill Battlefield is a historic district encompassing the battlefield of the Battle of Cane Hill, fought during the American Civil War on November 28, 1862, in and around the site of present-day Cane Hill, Arkansas. Because the battle was a running battle that extended over many hours and 12 miles (19 km) of roads, the battlefield is more than 5,700 acres (2,300 ha) in size, extending in all directions around Cane Hill. The northern section of the battlefield is an agricultural area that is little-altered except for the introduction of new roadways and rural buildings, and the abandonment of old roadway alignments. The southern section is hillier and more wooded, and is altered in similar ways.

The battlefield area was listed on the National Register of Historic Places in 1994.

== See also ==
- National Register of Historic Places listings in Washington County, Arkansas
