= James R. O'Neill =

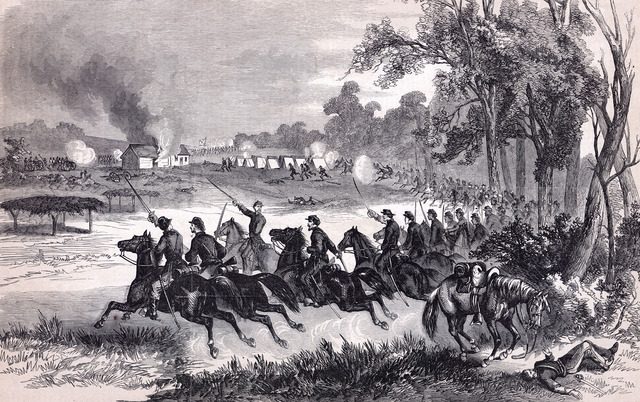
Union cavalry charge at Honey Springs, July 1863. Engraving based on sketch by James R. O'Neill.

James R. O'Neill (February 13, 1833, Ireland – October 6, 1863, Baxter Springs, Kansas) was a war artist and correspondent for Frank Leslie's Illustrated Newspaper during the American Civil War. He covered the Battle of Honey Springs in July 1863, and his sketch of the action was published to a nationwide audience. Less than three months later, however, O'Neill was killed in the Battle of Baxter Springs. He is believed to be the only newsman to be killed in action during the American Civil War.

== Biography ==
=== Early life ===
Born in an unknown location in Ireland, James Richard O'Neill emigrated across the Atlantic with his family in infancy. The Irish family at first lived in Quebec, but in 1843 emigrated again to Kenosha, Wisconsin. O'Neill spent his older childhood and early adulthood in Wisconsin, possibly helping out his father Charles O'Neill in the older man's duties as the Kenosha lighthouse keeper. In 1854 young O'Neill joined the Madison, Wisconsin-based Langrishe & Atwater company of traveling theatrical players. With naïve art skills, he worked at first as the company's stage crewman, designing and building sets and scenery. The company later expanded his role and he became a comic actor, specializing in Irish-dialect songs, dances, and stand-up comedy recitals.

In Madison in the late 1850s, O'Neill became a leading figure among his fellow young professionals. Local press accounts show him as the informal leader of a mock-fraternal organization, known officially as the 'K.O.T.F.N.' [possibly standing for "Knights of the Fraternal No-names"] but whose members usually called themselves just "The Club." The club won its longest press clippings on July 4, 1859, when they produced a street shivaree that poked satirical fun at the earnest Fourth of July Madison celebrations of the time. Club members dressed up in phony military uniforms, banged on pots and pans, and hauled out a fake cannon to fire mock salutes. Indignant letters to the editor followed.

In late 1860 or early 1861, O'Neill moved to Leavenworth in the fast-growing new state of Kansas, and attempted to become a full-time painter and artist. Kansas had very few art painters at that time and O'Neill was offered commissions ranging from stage scenery to a devout depiction of the Assumption of the Virgin. Leavenworth was a center of efforts by the U.S. Army to put down the emerging Confederate States of America and defeat supporters of slavery such as were to be found in large numbers in the neighboring slave state of Missouri. O'Neill found himself sketching soldiers and officers at the adjacent Fort Leavenworth. Through General James H. Lane, he developed ties in August 1861 with Frank Leslie's Illustrated Newspaper, a high-circulation illustrated paper of the 1860s and key media supporter of the Union cause. Frank Leslie's had let it be known that they would sometimes accept sketches sent to them by freelance artists, such as O'Neill.

=== American Civil War ===
James O'Neill's new ties with Frank Leslie's made it possible for him to travel with Union units that were willing to have a newsman embedded with them. As an artist with experience in the stylized depiction of landscape scenery, O'Neill was able to draw detailed portraits of the battle scenes he could see. Sketch artists like O'Neill often romanticized what they saw in terms of placing all of the action within a single frame with forced perspective, but the sketch artists for Leslie's, Harper's Weekly, and other illustrated weeklies were careful to portray soldiers and officers accurately in terms of their uniforms, arms, and equipment. Their sketches thus serve as valid American Civil War data, especially for humble objects and items of battlefield or fatigue wear that do not usually show up in the stiff, formal photographs of the time.

In late July, an American column under General James G. Blunt thrust into Indian Territory, with the goal of subduing Confederate strength within the Territory and recapturing the Confederate strongpoint at Fort Smith in adjacent Arkansas. On July 17, 1863, Confederate forces awaited the column at their encampment in Honey Springs. Although the American column had only 3,000 men and the Southerners numbered 6,000, the Union army won the day. O'Neill sketched a charge by a battalion of the 6th Kansas Cavalry during the latter stage of the battle. After the affray, O'Neill sent his pen-and-ink sketch to Leslie's home office in New York City, where the sketch was recut as a wood engraving for publication. This was a time-consuming process; O'Neill's sketch was published in the weekly's August 29, 1863, issue, more than a month after the battle. O'Neill also worked as a stringer, sending news accounts of the Arkansas campaigns to Leslie's for publication.

O'Neill remained embedded with the Union District of the Frontier under Blunt. The Union operations had regained control of Fort Smith, and Blunt took steps to advance his headquarters from Fort Scott, in eastern Kansas, to the western Arkansas river port. His headquarters column, moving southward, had reached Baxter Springs, Kansas, when they were intercepted and ambushed on October 6, 1863, by Quantrill's Raiders. This somewhat irregular unit of Southern rangers, commanded by guerrilla warrior William Quantrill, did not make a practice of taking prisoners. Unarmed and ancillary personnel in Blunt's column were cut down. Correspondent O'Neill was killed in action.

== See also ==
- National War Correspondents Memorial
