= Cutthroat Gap massacre =

1833 indigenous massacre in Oklahoma, US

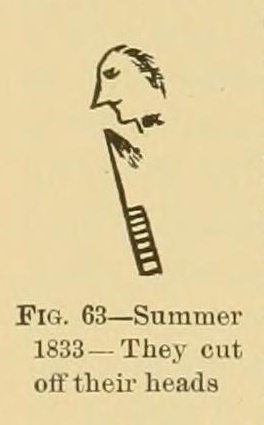
- Cutthroat massacre
- Location: 34°50′11″N 98°49′55″W; Cooperton, Kiowa County, Oklahoma
- Date: 1833 (UTC-6)
- Attack type: Mass murder
- Deaths: 150 killed and 2 captives
- Victims: Women, children and elderly
- Perpetrator: Osage warriors
- Defender: Kiowa tribal camp
- Motive: Raid on a Native American camp

Location within Oklahoma

The Cutthroat Gap massacre occurred in 1833, "The Year the Stars Fell" in Oklahoma. A group of Osage warriors charged into a Kiowa camp and brutally slaughtered the women, children and elderly there. Most of the warriors of this group of Kiowas, headed by Chief A'date (Kiowa: Àu:d̶áude, [ɔ́ːtɔ́ːtè]) or "Island Man" had left to raid a band of Utes or had gone bison hunting. The camp was left mainly unguarded and when the Osage came, the Kiowas had no choice but to flee. The Osage killed approximately 150 Kiowa people and took their sacred Tai-me ([tʰã́jmẽ́]) medicine bundle and two children captive.

== Events leading to the massacre ==
A few days before the Osage raid, the Kiowa bands from all over the Plains met near the Rainy Mountain Creek to discuss the annual Sun Dance ceremony, the most important religious ceremony of the Plains tribes, and hold a tribal council. An Osage arrow was found on the ground during this meeting and as a result, the different bands of the Kiowa scattered and ran from the threat of what was their biggest enemy. However, the Sun Dance was an extremely important event to all the Kiowas, where the normally independent bands of the tribe all gathered to reaffirm their basic beliefs about the universe and the supernatural so it was already an unspoken agreement that all the bands would come back together before the ceremony.

One particular group, headed by the Chief Islandman, left the creek and travelled southwest to find better grazing land and natural resources. They stopped west of the mountain, thinking they were safe and set up camp. Most of the men left to raid a Utes camp and to hunt buffalo. However, what the Kiowas didn't know was that they had been followed by a band of Osage from Three Forks that had been hunting bison in Kiowa domain. They wanted the Kiowa's horses and had been stalking Islandman's band ever since they left the meeting.

The day of the massacre, a young boy had been outside of the camp grazing his family's horse when he saw an Osage warrior hiding behind some rocks. He hurried back to raise the alarm and the Osage attacked.

== The massacre ==
The Kiowas were surprised, outnumbered and disorganized so they had no choice but to flee. Panic surrounded the camp as women struggled to find their babies and people ran in all different directions, hoping to get to safety. The Osage thundered into the camp, killing the women, children and the elderly mercilessly. They decapitated and murdered the victims in the camp and burned down the teepees. One old man escaped and managed to alert the nearest camp, enabling them to send a relief effort to help Islandman's struggling tribe.

=== Acts of bravery ===
There were many inspiring acts of bravery during the massacre. A visiting Pawnee warrior attempted to fight off the Osage warriors to allow some women and children to escape. In addition to this, a father is said to have carried his son with his teeth as he charged through the destruction, putting him down to shoot arrows at the Osage and then picking him up again to run. A young boy placed himself between the Osage warriors and the women and children and repeatedly shot arrows at the enemy. Also, a mother fought off an Osage warrior singlehandedly while carrying a baby in a cradle board on her back and holding her young daughter's hand.

== The aftermath ==
When the Kiowa warriors returned to the camp, all they found were the decapitated, mutilated bodies of the women, children and elderly that the Osage had killed. The victims' heads had been placed in cooking pots left at the camp. The Osage had also taken the sacred Tai-me medicine bundle that was necessary in order to perform the Sun Dance and a pair of siblings, a boy named Thunder and a girl named White Weasel captive. As a result, the Kiowa were not able to perform the Sun Dance ceremony for two years after the massacre until they negotiated with the Osage and got the Tai-me back.

After the massacre, Islandman was greatly dishonoured for letting his tribe be surprised and attacked. As a result, he was removed and replaced by Chief To-hau-san who led the tribe until his death a few decades later. It was this new chief who managed all relations with the Osage and the return of the Tai-me. He also refused to be pacified by the United States and the Kiowa tribe was one of the last of the Plains tribes to surrender to the United States government and their society.

Cutthroat Gap used to be a popular place for the Kiowa to camp but since the massacre, they have never used it again. Some even believe that the spirits of the victims still wandered the area and could be heard.

=== Osage and Kiowa relations ===
After they returned to camp, the Osage decided that they needed to make peace with the Kiowa. As a result, they resolved to take White Weasel back to the Kiowa as a peace-offering. Her brother, Thunder, had died during captivity but White Weasel was returned to the Kiowa tribe during the first Dragoon Expedition of 1834 which greatly improved Osage and Kiowa relations. In addition to this, the Osage allowed the Kiowa to take the Tai-me medicine bundle back in exchange for one pony, lessening the hostility between these two tribes.

== See also ==
- List of battles fought in Oklahoma

== Other links ==
"Expedition Oklahoma." Cutthroat Gap Massacre. Web. 24 May 2012.
