= 11th Texas Field Battery =

- Active: 22 April 1862 – 26 May 1865
- Country: Confederate States of America
- Allegiance: Confederate States of America, Texas
- Branch: Confederate States Army
- Type: Field Artillery
- Size: Artillery Battery
- Equipment: 2 x M1841 6-pounder field guns, 2 x M1841 12-pdr howitzer (Jan. 1863)
- Engagements: American Civil War; First Battle of Newtonia (1862); Battle of Old Fort Wayne (1862); Battle of Poison Spring (1864); Second Battle of Cabin Creek (1864)

Commanders
- Notable commanders: Sylvanus Howell

The 11th Texas Field Battery, also known as Howell's Texas Battery, was an artillery battery from Texas that served in the Confederate States Army during the American Civil War. Sylvanus Howell formed the battery on 22 April 1862 mostly from recruits in Fannin County, Texas. The unit served most of its career in Indian Territory. The battery's first action was the First Battle of Newtonia at the end of September 1862. A few weeks later, it lost all four guns in an action at Old Fort Wayne. The battery rearmed with two 6-pounder cannons and two 12-pounder howitzers and later joined a cavalry brigade led by Richard Montgomery Gano. In 1864, it fought at Poison Spring and Second Cabin Creek. The unit disbanded at the end of the conflict in May 1865.

== See also ==
- List of Texas Civil War Confederate units
- Texas in the American Civil War
