= Battle of the Wichita Village =

1858 U.S. Army massacre of Comanches in Indian Territory

Coordinates: 34.7874°N 97.9563°W

- Part of Plains Indian Wars and Comanche Wars
- Comanche Village, Women Dressing Robes and Drying Meat, 1834–1835 painting by George Catlin
Date	October 1, 1858
Location	Rush Creek, near present-day Rush Springs, Oklahoma
Result	Destruction of Comanche camp

Belligerents
United States; Brazos Reserve auxiliaries (Wichita [Tawakoni and Waco], Caddo, Tonkawa, and Delaware scouts)	Comanche (Kotsoteka and Penateka bands)

Commanders and leaders
Earl Van Dorn (WIA); Lawrence Sullivan Ross (WIA); Cornelius Van Camp †	Buffalo Hump; Hair-Bobbed-on-One-Side; Over-the-Buttes

Strength
4 companies of 2nd U.S. Cavalry; 100–135 Native American scouts	~120 lodges

Casualties and losses
5 killed, 11–12 wounded	58-70 killed, unknown wounded

The Battle of Wichita Village, also known as the Wichita Village Massacre, was a massacre conducted by the United States Army on October 1, 1858, along Rush Creek near present-day Rush Springs, Oklahoma.

Four companies of the 2nd U.S. Cavalry under Captain and Brevet Major Earl Van Dorn and a force of Native American scouts from the Brazos Reserve under Lawrence Sullivan Ross launched a dawn attack on a Comanche camp of Kotsoteka and Penateka people led by Chiefs Buffalo Hump (Potsanaquahip), Hair-Bobbed-on-One-Side, and Over-the-Buttes.

Unknown to Van Dorn, the Comanches had recently concluded a peace agreement with the U.S. Army commander at Fort Arbuckle and were camped beside a Wichita village without sentinels, believing the Army would not attack them. Van Dorn's forces killed between 58 to 70 Comanche people, stampeded their horse herd, and burned all 120 Comanche dwellings. The adjacent Wichita agricultural fields were also destroyed.

== Background ==
Prior to 1858, U.S. troops in Texas relied on defensive measures against Comanche raids. Frustrated by continued raids, the state of Texas organized an expedition of Texas Rangers and Brazos Indian Reserve scouts under Captain John Salmon Ford, who crossed into Indian Territory and defeated a Kotsoteka Comanche camp near the Canadian River on May 12, 1858, in the Battle of Little Robe Creek during the Antelope Hills expedition. Spurred by the Texans' success, Brigadier General David E. Twiggs, obtained permission to launch an offensive expedition into Indian Territory.

On September 15, 1858, Captain Earl Van Dorn marched north from Fort Belknap with four companies of the 2nd U.S. Cavalry and one company of the 5th Infantry. He was preceded by 100 to 135 Wichita (Tawakoni and Waco), Caddo, Tonkawa, and Delaware scouts from the Brazos Reserve led by twenty-year-old Lawrence Sullivan "Sul" Ross, who established a base camp on Otter Creek near present-day Tipton, Oklahoma, named Camp Radziminski.

While Van Dorn prepared to march north from Fort Belknap, Captain Prince at Fort Arbuckle concluded a peace agreement with Comanche chiefs Buffalo Hump, Hair-Bobbed-on-One-Side, and Over-the-Buttes. Neither U.S. commander knew of the other's actions. The Comanches (mainly Kotsotekas along with a band of Buffalo Hump's Penatekas) camped on Rush Creek to trade and gamble with the inhabitants of an adjacent Wichita village of grass houses. Comanche scouts reported the approach of Van Dorn's column to Hair-Bobbed-on-One-Side, who concluded that the soldiers would not attack after making a treaty. Feeling secure in Indian Territory, the Comanches did not guard their horses or camp. On the afternoon of September 29, two Wichita scouts sent by Van Dorn returned to Camp Radziminski and reported that the Comanches were camped beside the Wichita village; within an hour, Van Dorn and his cavalry rode east on a 36-hour march.

== Massacre ==
At dawn on October 1, 1858, Van Dorn's cavalry and Ross's scouts attacked the sleeping Comanche camp. At the outset of the charge, the attackers stampeded and captured the Comanches' unguarded herd of roughly 300 horses, leaving the villagers on foot. While most women, elderly, and children fled into the brush, those Comanches able to fight attempted a defense. Close-quarters fighting lasted for more than an hour before the surviving Comanches fled.

During the fighting, Lieutenant Cornelius Van Camp (an 1855 West Point graduate) was killed. Ross was severely wounded and nearly died. Van Dorn was also seriously wounded.

Van Dorn reported 56 Comanche men and two women killed on the field, with total Comanche deaths reported at 70. U.S. forces lost one officer (Van Camp) and four enlisted men killed (including one missing and presumed killed), along with Van Dorn, Ross, and nine or ten enlisted men wounded.

== Aftermath ==
Following the fight, Van Dorn's troops burned all 120 Comanche dwellings along with the camp's supplies, leaving the survivors, primarily women, children, and elderly, on foot and destitute. UThe Wichitas of the neighboring village, whose food crop had been destroyed, fled to Fort Arbuckle for help. After recovering sufficiently to travel, Van Dorn's troops marched back to Camp Radziminski on Otter Creek.

The assault on a camp operating under a peace truce provoked retaliatory Comanche raids across the Texas frontier. Blaming the reservation tribes for the raids despite the service of Brazos Reserve scouts under Ford and Van Dorn, white vigilantes attacked a sleeping hunting camp of Caddo and Anadarko people from the Brazos Reserve on December 27, 1858, wounding eight children and killing four men and three women. Among these were Little John, a nephew of Anadarko chief José María who had served with Van Dorn. Continued settler attacks led federal Indian agent Robert Neighbors to evacuate the Brazos and Clear Fork reserve tribes out of Texas in August 1859 to a new reservation on the Washita River in Indian Territory.

Van Dorn denied having any knowledge of the Fort Arbuckle peace council and led the 2nd Cavalry on a second expedition against Buffalo Hump's camp near the Arkansas River in spring 1859, killing 49 Comanches and capturing 37. Following the repeated surprise attacks on their camps in 1858 and 1859, the Comanches withdrew from the open plains of Indian Territory into the high plains and canyonlands of southwestern Kansas and the Oklahoma and Texas panhandles.

=== Location ===
The exact site of the massacre was disputed for several years until 1937, when U.S. Army Captain Wilbur Sturtevant Nye established from 1859 military maps, Army reports, and veteran testimonies that it took place on the Huntley farm along Rush Creek, about five miles southeast of Rush Springs, Oklahoma, in Grady County, Oklahoma.

== See also ==
- Antelope Hills expedition
- Battle of Little Robe Creek
- Comanche Wars
- Plains Indian Wars
- Texas–Indian wars
- List of battles fought in Oklahoma
- List of Indian massacres in North America
