= Battle of Massard Prairie =

1864 battle of the American Civil War

- Part of the American Civil War
Date	July 27, 1864 (162 years ago)
Location	Sebastian County, Arkansas 35°18′41.0″N 94°22′52.6″W
Result	Confederate victory

Belligerents
Confederate States	United States (Union)

Commanders and leaders
(Confederate States of America) Richard M. Gano	(United States) David Mefford (surrendered)

Units involved
District of the Indian Territory	6th Kansas Cavalry

Strength
~600 cavalry	~200 cavalry

Casualties and losses
7 dead, 27 wounded or missing	10 killed 15 wounded 127 captured
- Location within Arkansas

The Battle of Massard Prairie was fought on July 27, 1864 in Sebastian County, Arkansas during the American Civil War. Confederate troops led by Brigadier-General Richard M. Gano successfully launched a surprise attack on a Union camp held by four companies of the 6th Kansas Cavalry, capturing prisoners and equipment.

The battle exemplified the hit-and-run nature of the Civil War in Arkansas on the western border: this was a war of raids and ambushes involving small forces, not drawn-out, large-scale battles. As a Confederate victory, it also demonstrated the difficulty faced by Union units attempting to exert control over the state during the war's later stages.

== Background ==
In the wake of Frederick Steele’s failed Camden campaign in April 1864, Confederate and Union roles on the frontier reversed. Union forces now attempted to hold the line of the Arkansas River against Confederate raids, while emboldened Confederates became more aggressive in their operations.

== Battle ==
An opportunity presented itself to the Confederates in late July 1864. In response to a shortage of both horses and forage, 200 Union cavalrymen of the Sixth Kansas Cavalry encamped at Massard Prairie, less than eight miles south of Fort Smith (Sebastian County). The unit's horses could graze on the prairie, and the advanced position also provided security for the Union garrison at Fort Smith. However, the position was exposed to attack. Recognizing this, Confederate Brigadier General Douglas H. Cooper ordered Brigadier General Richard M. Gano to attack the Union camp.

On July 26, Gano assembled 600 Texas and Native American cavalrymen at Page's Ferry on the Poteau River, ten miles southwest of the Union camp. As the force gathered before dark, Gano realized it would be too small to effect Cooper's elaborate plan of attack, so Gano decided to lead the entire force against the Union troops. The Confederates traveled all night, arriving in the vicinity of Massard Prairie before daybreak on July 27.

The Union cavalrymen were encamped in a grove of trees on the south side of the prairie. The majority of the unit's horses had been out grazing since daylight, and by about 6:00 a.m., the herd was three-quarters of a mile southwest of the camp.

At sunrise, Gano's Confederate troops advanced. A report by a Union cavalryman on guard duty, confirmed by sounds of gunfire, alerted Union Major David Mefford and his officers. Within five minutes after the first alarm, the dismounted Union cavalrymen had formed a line to meet the Confederates. The Union troops were ordered to bring in the horses, secure the camp's flanks, and send messengers to Fort Smith to report the attack.

Gano spoiled these efforts. His men charged the Union troops from the front and on both flanks, causing the herd to stampede and forcing the Union cavalry to fight on foot. The Union troops were soon surrounded in the grove of trees. With two companies on the camp's left and two more on the right, and armed with superior breech-loading weapons, Mefford's command initially held its ground, repulsing all attacks. But the Confederates outnumbered their enemy and had the advantage of mobility. In the open prairie, the mounted Confederates were able to flank the Union troops at will, advancing, firing, retiring, and advancing again.

Inevitably the Union cavalrymen began to give way. Those Union troops lucky enough to secure horses had already retreated to Fort Smith, and the remaining Union troops began a fighting withdrawal toward the north across the prairie. Although several of their charges were repulsed, the Confederates continually pressed their advantage, taking prisoners all the while. Finally, near a house in the prairie one mile north of the camp, the last Union contingent was captured.

Gano moved quickly to secure the fruits of his victory. The Confederates reported taking almost 127 prisoners, in addition to capturing needed carbines, pistols, camp equipment, and other supplies. Union casualties numbered ten dead and fifteen wounded; Confederate casualties numbered seven dead and twenty-six wounded. After burning captured items that could not be removed, Gano's troops, with their prisoners and spoils, returned to camp twenty-four hours after they had departed the evening before. An ineffective Union pursuit did not trouble the Confederates.

== Aftermath ==
The Action at Massard Prairie demonstrated the tenuous Union hold on Arkansas's western border and encouraged the Confederates, leading to the Action at Fort Smith a few days later.

== See also ==
- List of American Civil War battles
- Troop engagements of the American Civil War, 1864
