= 6th Kansas Cavalry Regiment =

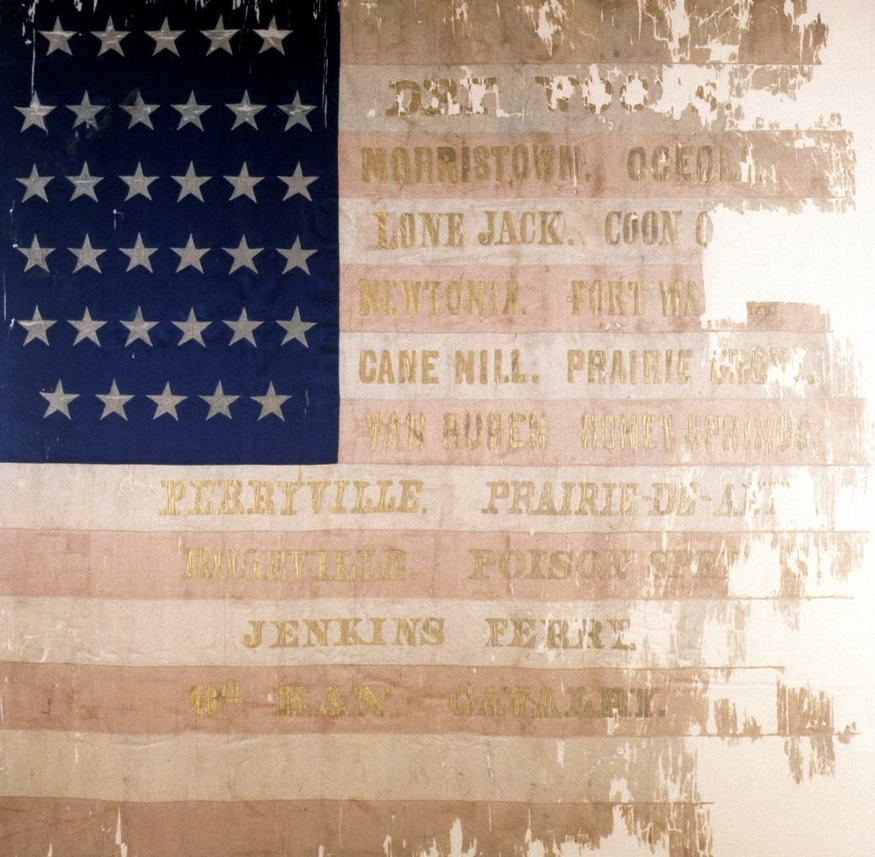
- Active: July 1861 – August 27, 1865
- Country: United States
- Allegiance: Union
- Branch: Cavalry
- Engagements: First Battle of Newtonia; Battle of Old Fort Wayne; Battle of Prairie Grove; Camden Expedition; Battle of Honey Springs; Battle of Massard Prairie

The 6th Kansas Cavalry Regiment was a cavalry regiment that served in the Union Army during the American Civil War.

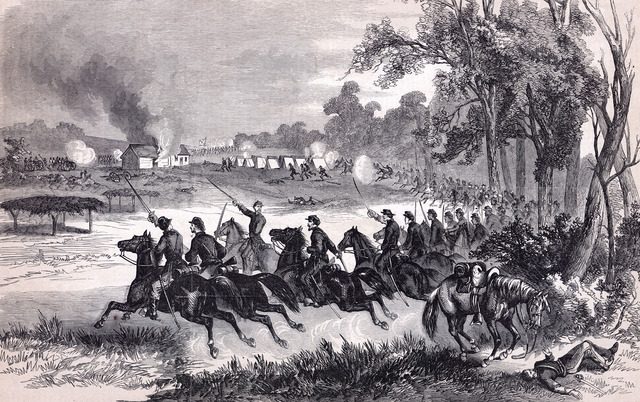
The 6th Kansas Cavalry at the Battle of Honey Springs, July 1863. Engraving based on sketch by James R. O'Neill.

== Service ==
The 6th Kansas Cavalry Regiment was organized at Fort Scott, Kansas, in July 1861. The regiment began as three companies of home guard infantry, followed quickly by five additional companies, one of which was cavalry. On September 9, 1861, these recruits were reorganized and officers were elected. The reorganized regiment was then mustered in for three years under the command of Colonel William R. Judson.

The regiment was attached to Department of Kansas to August 1862. 2nd Brigade, Department of Kansas, to October 1862. 2nd Brigade, 1st Division, Army of the Frontier, Department of Missouri, to February 1863 1st Brigade, 1st Division, Army of the Frontier, to June 1863. District of the Frontier, Department of Missouri, to January 1864. District of the Frontier, VII Corps, Department of Arkansas, to March 1864. 3rd Brigade, District of the Frontier, VII Corps, to January 1865. 2nd Brigade, 3rd Division, VII Corps, to February 1865. 1st Brigade, 2nd Division, VII Corps, to August 1865.

The 6th Kansas Cavalry mustered out of service at Fort Leavenworth, Kansas August 27, 1865.

== Detailed service ==
Duty at Fort Scott until March 1862. Dry Wood Creek, Fort Scott, September 1, 1861. Morristown September 17. Osceola September 20, 21 and 22. (The 3 original companies marched to Fort Lincoln September 1, 1861; then returned to Fort Scott.) Little Santa Fe, Missouri, November 6. Regiment reorganized March 27, 1862, and A, B and C (original companies) mustered out. Duty at Fort Scott until May. Carthage, Missouri, March 23. Diamond Grove April 14. Lost Creek April 15. Companies C, H, and K moved to Carthage, Missouri, with the 15th Kansas Cavalry, rejoining in May. Regiment stationed at various points on southern line of Kansas Headquarters at Paola until June. Concentrated at Fort Scott. Expedition into Indian Territory May 25-July (Companies C, H, and K). Reconnaissance from Grand River to Fort Gibson, Tahliquah and Park Hill, and skirmishes June 14–17. Regiment joined June 20. Expedition into Cherokee Country July 2-August 1. Stand Watie's Mill July 4 (2 companies). Expedition from Fort Leavenworth to Independence August 12–14 (1 company). Clear Creek August 19. Taboursville August 20. Osage River August 21. Coon Creek, near Lamar, and Lamar, August 24. Operations in southwest Missouri September to December. Expedition through Jackson, Cass, Johnson and Lafayette Counties, Missouri, September 8–23. Hickory Grove September 19. Granby September 24. Newtonia September 30. Occupation of Newtonia October 4. Old Fort Wayne or Beattie's Prairie, near Maysville, October 22. Operations in Jackson County against Quantrill November 1–5. Drywood, Boston Mountains. November 9. Reconnaissance toward Van Buren and Fort Smith November 20. Near Cane Hill November 25. Cane Hill November 28. Battle of Prairie Grove, Arkansas, December 7. Expedition over Boston Mountains to Van Buren December 27–29. Dripping Springs December 29. (1st Battalion, Companies A, C, F, and H camped on Crane Creek, near Springfield, Missouri, until March 1863.) Operations in Newton and Jasper Counties March 5–13 (Companies A and C). Near Sherwood March 9 (Companies A and C). Companies F and H marched from Westbrook to Salem, thence to Rolla May 7; thence to Fort Scott June 21-July 4. Webber Falls, Cherokee Nation, April 21–23 (3rd Battalion). Big Creek, near Pleasant Hill, May 15 (Company E). Fort Gibson May 22 and 25. Greenleaf Prairie June 17. Cabin Creek July 1–2. Elk Creek, near Honey Springs, July 17. Perryville August 26. Operations in Cherokee Nation September 11–25. Webber Falls October 12. Moved to Fort Smith November 13–18 and duty there until March 1864. Scout to Baker's Springs January 21–25. Baker's Springs, Caddo Gap, January 24. Steele's Expedition to Camden March 31-May 3 (Companies A, C, G, K, and M). Roseville April 4–5 (detachment). Stone's Ferry April 5 (detachment). Prairie D'Ann April 9–12. Moscow April 13. Dutch Mills April 14. Camden April 16–18. Poison Springs April 18 (detachment). Saline Bottom April 29. Jenkins Ferry, Saline River, April 30. Moved to Dardanelle, then to Fort Smith May 6–16. Dardanelle May 10. Clarksville May 18. Fayetteville May 19. Roseville June 4–5 (detachment). Hahn's Farm, near Waldron, and Iron Bridge June 19. Balance of regiment near Fort Smith and duty there until September. Massard's Prairie July 27 (Companies B, D, E, and H). Near Fort Smith July 31. Lee's Creek August 1 (detachment). Van Buren August 12. Fort Smith August 27. March to Cabin Creek, Cherokee Nation, September 14–19. Fort Scott October 22. Cow Creek October 23 (detachment). Training Post October 24. Moved from Fort Smith to Clarksville December 29 and duty there until February 16, 1865. Moved to Little Rock and duty there until June. Consolidated to a battalion April 18, 1865. Moved to Duvall's Bluffs June 5, then to Fort Leavenworth, Kansas, July 27-August 11.

== Casualties ==
The regiment lost a total of 228 men during service; 4 officers and 81 enlisted men killed or mortally wounded, 3 officers and 140 enlisted men died of disease.

== Commanders ==
- Colonel William R. Judson
- Lieutenant Colonel Lewis R. Jewell - Namesake of Jewell County, Kansas, died at the Battle of Cane Hill, on 28 November 1862.

== Notable members ==
- Captain Charles F. Clarke, Company F - Namesake of Clark County, Kansas, Assistant Adjutant General in the U.S. Volunteers, died at Memphis, Tennessee, on 10 December 1862.

== See also ==
- List of Kansas Civil War Units
- Kansas in the Civil War
