= 2nd Independent Battery Indiana Light Artillery =

- Active: August 9, 1861 – July 3, 1865
- Country: United States
- Allegiance: Union
- Branch: Artillery
- Equipment: 4 James rifles, 2 6-pdr smoothbore guns
- Engagements: Capture of Fort Gibson; Battle of Old Fort Wayne; Battle of Prairie Grove; Battle of Devil's Backbone (2 sections); Camden Expedition; Battle of Nashville

2nd Indiana Battery Light Artillery was an artillery battery that served in the Union Army during the American Civil War.

== Service ==
The battery was organized at Indianapolis, Indiana and mustered in for a three-year enlistment on August 9, 1861, under the command of Captain John W. Rabb.

The battery was attached to Fremont's Army of the West to November 1861. District of Fort Scott, Kansas, Department of Kansas, to June 1862. Solomon's 3rd Brigade, Department of Kansas, to October 1862. 3rd Brigade, 1st Division, Army of the Frontier, to January 1863. Springfield, Missouri, Department of the Missouri, to July 1863. District of the Frontier, Department of the Missouri, to December 1863. 2nd Brigade, District of the Frontier, to January 1864. 2nd Brigade, District of the Frontier, VII Corps, Department of Arkansas, to September 1864. Indianapolis, Indiana, to October 1864. Post and District of Nashville, Tennessee, Department of the Cumberland, to February 1865. Garrison artillery, Murfreesboro, Tennessee, Department of the Cumberland, to July 1865.

The 2nd Indiana Battery Light Artillery mustered out of service on July 3, 1865, in Indianapolis.

== Detailed service ==
Left Indiana for St. Louis, Missouri, September 5, 1861. Camp at St. Louis, September 6–25, 1861. Fremont's advance on Springfield, Missouri, October 4-November 2. Moved to Fort Leavenworth, Kansas; then to Fort Scott, Kansas, and duty there until May 1862. Moved to Iola, Kansas, May 23. Expedition into Indian Territory May 25-July 8. Action at Round Grove, Indian Territory, June 5. Capture of Fort Gibson July 18. Blount's Campaign in Missouri and Arkansas September to December. Old Fort Wayne, or Beattie's Prairie, near Maysville, October 22. Between Fayetteville and Cane Hill November 9. Cane Hill, Boston Mountains, November 28. Capture of Fort Davis. Battle of Prairie Grove December 7. Moved to Springfield, Missouri, January 1863, and duty there until June 1863. Operations in Indian Territory and Arkansas July to September. Action at Perryville, Cherokee Nation, August 26. Cotton Gap, Devil's Backbone, Fort Smith September 1. Dardanelle September 9. Creek Agency, Indian Territory, October 15 and 25. Duty at Waldron and Fort Smith and operations in western Arkansas until March 1864. Scout from Waldron to Mt. Ida, Caddo Gap, and Dallas December 2–7, 1863. Niobrara December 4, 1863. Steele's Expedition to Camden March 23-May 3, 1864. Prairie D'Ann April 9–12. Moscow April 13. Camden April 16–18. Poison Springs April 18. Jenkins' Ferry, Saline River, April 30. Duty at Fort Smith until September. Mazzard's Prairie, near Fort Smith, July 27. Defense of Fort Smith July 29–31. Ordered to Indiana September, and non-veterans mustered out September 14, 1864. Battery reorganized at Indianapolis, Indiana, October 14, 1864. Moved to Nashville, Tennessee, and assigned to duty there as garrison artillery November 1864 to June 1865. Battle of Nashville December 15–16, 1864. Ordered to Indiana June 1865.

== Casualties ==
The battery lost a total of 28 men during service; 1 officer and 13 enlisted men killed or mortally wounded, 14 enlisted men died of disease.

== Commanders ==
- Captain John W. Rabb
- Captain James S. Wicher

== See also ==
- List of Indiana Civil War regiments
- Indiana in the Civil War
