= Battle of Locust Grove =

Battle of the American Civil War

- Part of the Trans-Mississippi Theater of the American Civil War
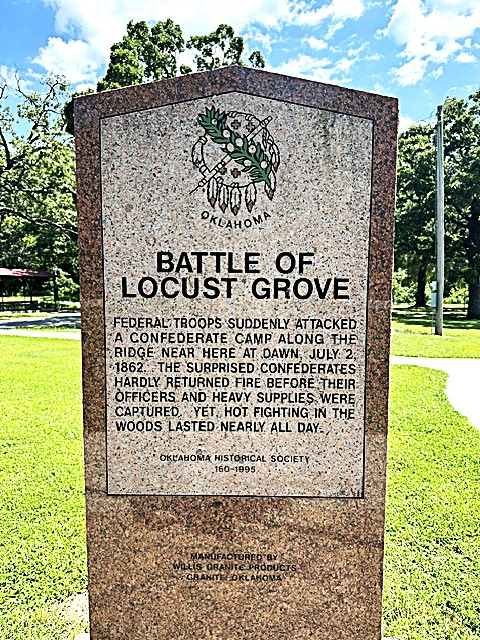
- Granite marker on the Battle of Locust Grove, as seen in July of 2026
Date	July 3, 1862
Location	Cherokee Nation, Indian Territory (present-day Mayes County, Oklahoma) 36°11.889′N 95°8.998′W
Result	Union victory

Belligerents
Union Army	Confederate Army

Commanders and leaders
William Weer	James J. Clarkson

Strength
250	300

Casualties and losses
9	200
- Union victory

The Battle of Locust Grove was a small-scale confrontation of the American Civil War in the Indian Territory on July 3, 1862. About 250 Union troops commanded by Colonel William Weer, surprised approximately 300 Confederate troops commanded by Colonel James J. Clarkson, who were encamped near Pipe Springs. The Confederates, unable to form a battle line, were quickly dispersed into a thicket of locust trees. (Note: The locust trees were likely of the black locust (Robinia pseudoacacia) variety, which are native to this part of North America.) The skirmish resulted in about 100 Confederate soldiers dead and about 100 wounded or captured. Their commander was one of the prisoners. The Union claimed that its losses were three killed and six wounded. The Union troops also captured most of the Confederate supplies, including 60 wagons, 64 mule teams and a large quantity of other supplies. A number of Confederate troops escaped capture and took off for Tahlequah and Park Hill.

Weer and his men spent the Fourth of July at the battle site dividing the captured clothing among the victorious soldiers and apportioning all other captured supplies among the various units. After breaking camp, Weer and his men proceeded to Flat Rock, about 14 miles (23 km) from Fort Gibson, which was then held by the Confederates.

The site of the battle is East of the present-day town of Locust Grove, Oklahoma. There is a commemorative marker on Scenic Route 412 in Pipe Springs Park, at coordinates 36° 11.889′ N, 95° 8.998′ W. The inscription reads:

“Federal troops suddenly attacked a Confederate camp along the ridge near here at dawn, July 2, 1862. The surprised Confederates hardly returned fire before their officers and heavy supplies were captured. Yet, hot fighting in the woods lasted nearly all day.”

On April 8, 1864 Weer was arrested for misappropriation of prisoner funds, drunkenness and neglect of duty. He was convicted following a court martial and cashiered from the army on August 20, 1864.
