= Rush Springs, Oklahoma =

- Town
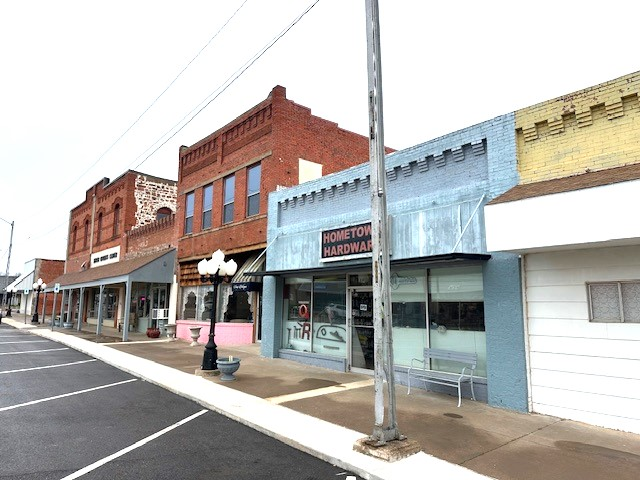
- Downtown Rush Springs in March 2025
- Nickname: Radiator Springs
- Motto: "Watermelon Capital of the World"
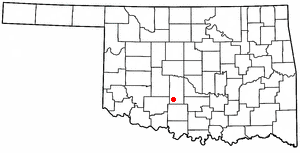
- Location of Rush Springs, Oklahoma
- Coordinates: 34°46′44″N 97°57′26″W
- Country: United States
- State: Oklahoma
- County: Grady

Area
  - Total: 1.16 sq mi (3.01 km^{2})
  - Land: 1.16 sq mi (3.01 km^{2})
  - Water: 0 sq mi (0.00 km^{2})
- Elevation: 1,296 ft (395 m)

Population (2020)
  - Total: 997
  - Density: 858.1/sq mi (331.32/km^{2})
- Time zone: UTC-6 (Central (CST))
  - Summer (DST): UTC-5 (CDT)
- ZIP code: 73082
- Area code: 580
- FIPS code: 40-64300
- GNIS feature ID: 2412584

Rush Springs is a town in Grady County, Oklahoma, United States. The population was 997 at the 2020 census, a 19% decrease from 2010. The town promotes itself as the "Watermelon Capital of the World."

The community's largest event is the annual Rush Springs Watermelon Festival, which attracts about 30,000 people each year. They consume about 50,000 pounds of watermelon during this event.

== History ==
The Wichita people established a village about 1850 near some springs on Rush Creek. (The present-day town of Rush Springs later developed about 4 miles (6 km) northwest of here.) Cattlemen watered their herds of cattle they were driving north from Texas to Kansas on the Chisholm Trail, which passed east of here.

On October 1, 1858, an event known as the Battle of the Wichita Village occurred near here, with spillover to the Wichita when the US Army destroyed their crops.

That year, Brigadier General David S. Briggs had ordered Brevet Major Earl Van Dorn to take command of the Second Cavalry at Fort Belknap, Texas. He was directed to proceed north of the Red River into Indian Territory and forcibly restrain belligerent Comanche warriors who were raiding settlements. Van Dorn and his men stopped at Camp Radziminski in Indian Territory. Van Dorn and his men advanced on the Comanche, who were camped on Rush Creek near a Wichita village. (Note: The Comanche campsite was about 6 miles (9.7 km) south east of present-day Rush Springs.) The Army was apparently unaware that the two tribes were conducting a peace conference.

Van Dorn and his men attacked the Comanche camp about dawn on October 1, 1858, catching the warriors completely off guard. In the aftermath of the attack, the troops found that the Comanche had lost seventy people, mostly men but also some tribeswomen who had accompanied them. Any survivors had fled. The army casualties were four men dead and one missing, who was presumed killed. Major Van Dorn was seriously wounded, but survived to fight again. The army was reported to have set fire to the Wichita fields nearby, destroying their food crop and endangering their survival. The Wichita fled to Fort Arbuckle to seek assistance from the U.S. government.

In 1871, supplies bound for Fort Sill (which had been founded in 1869), were brought through Rush Springs. The Missouri-Kansas-Texas Railway (also known as the M-K-T or Katy) had been completed to the Choctaw Nation community of Caddo. Supplies were transferred here to wagons to transport them to Rush Springs. Freight and stage travel from Caddo to Rush Springs was discontinued about 1885.

The first post office was designated as Parr, and opened at the Samuel M. Huntley ranch house in July 1883. The house was southeast of Rush Springs. When the Chicago, Rock Island and Pacific Railway (usually called simply the Rock Island) completed its line through Rush Springs in July 1892, the post office relocated into the town and was renamed for it. 2 square miles (5.2 km^{2}) of town was surveyed and platted. It was incorporated on November 21, 1898. At that time, the community was located within Pickens County, Chickasaw Nation.

By 1900 the community had 518 residents and 588 by 1907, when Oklahoma became a state. At that time, new county jurisdictions were set up, and Rush Springs was located in Grady County, Oklahoma.

During the Great Depression, a Civilian Conservation Corps project was initiated on the east side of Rush Springs to provide employment and improve the region. Young men were paid to construct terraces and ponds and to restore vegetation by replanting trees. The project camp was opened June 18, 1933, and closed July 20, 1942.

== Geography ==
Rush Springs is located in southern Grady County. U.S. Route 81 passes through the town, leading north 19 miles (31 km) to Chickasha, the county seat, and south 20 miles (32 km) to Duncan.

According to the United States Census Bureau, Rush Springs has a total area of 1.0 square mile (2.7 km^{2}), all land.

== Demographics ==
Historical population
Census	Pop.	Note	%±
1900	518		—
1910	823		58.9%
1920	768		−6.7%
1930	1,340		74.5%
1940	1,422		6.1%
1950	1,402		−1.4%
1960	1,303		−7.1%
1970	1,381		6.0%
1980	1,451		5.1%
1990	1,229		−15.3%
2000	1,278		4.0%
2010	1,231		−3.7%
2020	997		−19.0%
U.S. Decennial Census

=== 2020 census ===
As of the 2020 census, Rush Springs had a population of 997. The median age was 39.9 years. 25.1% of residents were under the age of 18 and 19.8% of residents were 65 years of age or older. For every 100 females there were 83.3 males, and for every 100 females age 18 and over there were 77.0 males age 18 and over.

0.0% of residents lived in urban areas, while 100.0% lived in rural areas.

There were 427 households in Rush Springs, of which 34.4% had children under the age of 18 living in them. Of all households, 39.6% were married-couple households, 18.3% were households with a male householder and no spouse or partner present, and 33.0% were households with a female householder and no spouse or partner present. About 29.7% of all households were made up of individuals and 16.1% had someone living alone who was 65 years of age or older.

There were 546 housing units, of which 21.8% were vacant. The homeowner vacancy rate was 0.7% and the rental vacancy rate was 24.0%.

Racial composition as of the 2020 census
Race	Number	Percent
White	755	75.7%
Black or African American	0	0.0%
American Indian and Alaska Native	57	5.7%
Asian	2	0.2%
Native Hawaiian and Other Pacific Islander	2	0.2%
Some other race	1	0.1%
Two or more races	180	18.1%
Hispanic or Latino (of any race)	21	2.1%

=== 2000 census ===
As of the census of 2000, there were 1,278 people, 525 households, and 349 families residing in the town. The population density was 1,201.7 inhabitants per square mile (464.0/km^{2}). There were 627 housing units at an average density of 589.6 per square mile (227.6/km^{2}). The racial makeup of the town was 88.18% White, 6.96% Native American, 1.17% from other races, and 3.68% from two or more races. Hispanic or Latino of any race were 2.35% of the population.

There were 525 households, out of which 32.6% had children under the age of 18 living with them, 50.1% were married couples living together, 11.2% had a female householder with no husband present, and 33.5% were non-families. 30.1% of all households were made up of individuals, and 18.5% had someone living alone who was 65 years of age or older. The average household size was 2.43 and the average family size was 3.01.

In the town, the population was spread out, with 27.6% under the age of 18, 8.8% from 18 to 24, 26.9% from 25 to 44, 18.7% from 45 to 64, and 17.9% who were 65 years of age or older. The median age was 36 years. For every 100 females, there were 92.2 males. For every 100 females age 18 and over, there were 84.6 males.

The median income for a household in the town was $21,078, and the median income for a family was $25,391. Males had a median income of $24,453 versus $20,769 for females. The per capita income for the town was $10,803. About 24.7% of families and 32.5% of the population were below the poverty line, including 45.3% of those under age 18 and 24.6% of those age 65 or over.
