= Fort Wayne (Indian Territory) =

Fort Wayne was the name of two forts near the present-day border of northeastern Oklahoma and northwestern Arkansas.

Indian Territory by Lt. Col. R.B. Mason of the 1st Dragoons. Originally, Captain John Stuart of the 7th Infantry was ordered to build the fort (then designated as Camp Illinois) on the south bank of the Illinois River headwaters. Before its completion, new orders changed the location to Spavinaw Creek, nearer the Arkansas – Indian Territory border. Lt. Colonel Richard B. Mason and the First Dragoons were tasked to perform the relocation in 1840. (Note: The installation was originally named Camp Illinois, but the name was changed to Fort Wayne after the Watts site was relocated.) Named for Gen. "Mad" Anthony Wayne, it was intended to supplant Fort Coffee as a link in the great line of forts protecting the American West. Specifically, it was to protect a nearby military road and relieve residents of northwestern Arkansas of fears of depredations by Cherokees living in Indian Territory. The army abandoned the fort in 1842 due to the high incidence of malaria suffered by soldiers assigned there, and turned it over to the Cherokee Nation. It was used thereafter by Stand Watie and his followers until the Civil War Battle of Old Fort Wayne in October, 1862.

At the beginning of the Civil War, Stand Watie took over the fort site, where he organized the Cherokee Mounted Rifles. The Union met the Confederates near here in 1862 for the Battle of Old Fort Wayne.

The old fort was located in present-day Adair County, near U.S. Hwy 59 just north of Watts, Oklahoma. An Oklahoma State Historical site marker can be seen alongside the highway. The marker was placed in the 1970s at the request of area residents. Up until this time most residents had no idea the fort had ever existed. The site of the newer fort built in 1840, was in present-day Delaware County near the community of Maysville, Arkansas Nothing remains of the fort at either location. The area is located on the Oklahoma/Arkansas border just south of present-day Siloam Springs, Arkansas.

== See also ==
- Battle of Old Fort Wayne

== Bibliography ==
- Hitchcock, Ethan Allen. A Traveler in Indian Territory:The Journal of Ethan Allen Hitchcock. Edited and annotated by Grant Foreman. Originally published 1930. Web version available in part through Google Books. Retrieved June 15, 2013.
- Wright, Murial H.; George H. Shirk; Kenny A. Franks. Mark of Heritage. Oklahoma City: Oklahoma Historical Society, 1976.
