= William F. Cloud =

Union Army officer (1825–1905)

- William F. Cloud (ca. 1900)
- Born: March 23, 1825; Columbus, Ohio
- Died: March 4, 1905 (aged 79); Kansas City, Missouri
- Military career
- Allegiance: Union
- Branch: Union Army
- Service years: 1846 – 1847; 1861 – 1865
- Rank: Colonel, U.S.V.
- Commands: 10th Kansas Infantry; 2nd Kansas Cavalry
- Conflicts: Mexican War; American Civil War: Battle of Wilson's Creek; Battle of Pea Ridge; Battle of Old Fort Wayne; Battle of Cane Hill; Battle of Prairie Grove; Battle of Honey Springs; Battle of Devil's Backbone; Battle of Jenkins' Ferry; Battle of Westport
- Other work: author, speaker

William Fletcher Cloud (March 23, 1825 – March 4, 1905) was an officer in the Union Army during the American Civil War who participated in many battles in the Trans-Mississippi Theater.

== Early life and career ==
Cloud was born near Columbus, Ohio and enlisted in a company that became part of the 2nd Ohio Infantry in 1846 for the war with Mexico. After the Mexican War Cloud returned to Ohio and served in a local militia company, the Columbus Videttes, in which he was elected captain. In 1859 he moved to Michigan, where he lived briefly before moving to Lawrence, Kansas, then Emporia, Kansas.

== Civil War ==
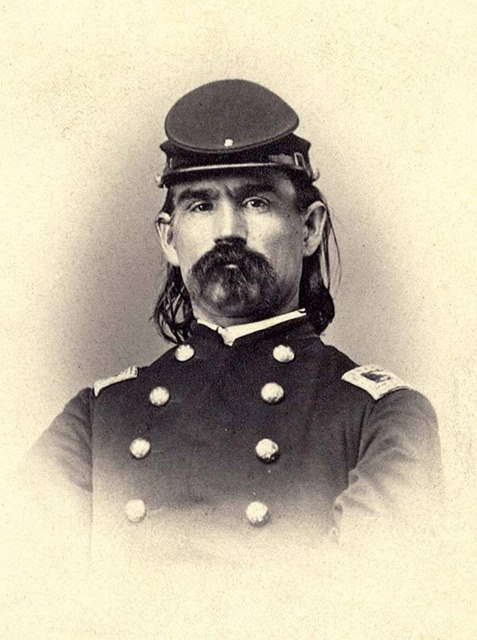
Colonel William F. Cloud

With the outbreak of the Civil War, Cloud enlisted in the 2nd Kansas Infantry as major and distinguished himself at the battle of Wilson's Creek. After his infantry enlistment expired, Cloud organized the 2nd Kansas Cavalry in 1862, and was commissioned major of the regiment. In March 1862 he was appointed colonel of the 10th Kansas Infantry, but was later transferred to command of the 2nd Kansas Cavalry. He commanded a brigade in James G. Blunt's division at the battles of Old Fort Wayne, Cane Hill and Prairie Grove. Afterward he commanded the District of Southwest Missouri.

Cloud reverted to regimental command and fought at Honey Springs and was the senior Union officer on the field at the battle of Devil's Backbone. In 1864 he commanded a cavalry brigade under John M. Thayer at the battle of Jenkins' Ferry. He served as aide-de-camp to Samuel R. Curtis at the battle of Westport and was mustered out of the volunteer service on January 19, 1865.

== Later life ==
Soon after the Civil War ended, Cloud moved to Carthage, Missouri. He became a noted speaker and author. Around 1899, he moved to Kansas City, Missouri, where he lived until his death on March 4, 1905. Cloud County, Kansas is named for him.

== Works ==
- Church and State; or, Mexican politics from Cortez to Diaz (Kansas City, Missouri: Peck & Clark), 1896.
- The Heart of Mexico: Politics! Religion! War! Spain and Her Methods Overthrown (Kansas City, Missouri: Hailman & Co.), 1898.
- Webster Davis on Toast: Facts, Not Fiction, Sense, Not Sobs, About the Boer-British War, with Strictures on the Flop (Kansas City, Missouri: s.n.), 1900.
