= Verplanck Van Antwerp =

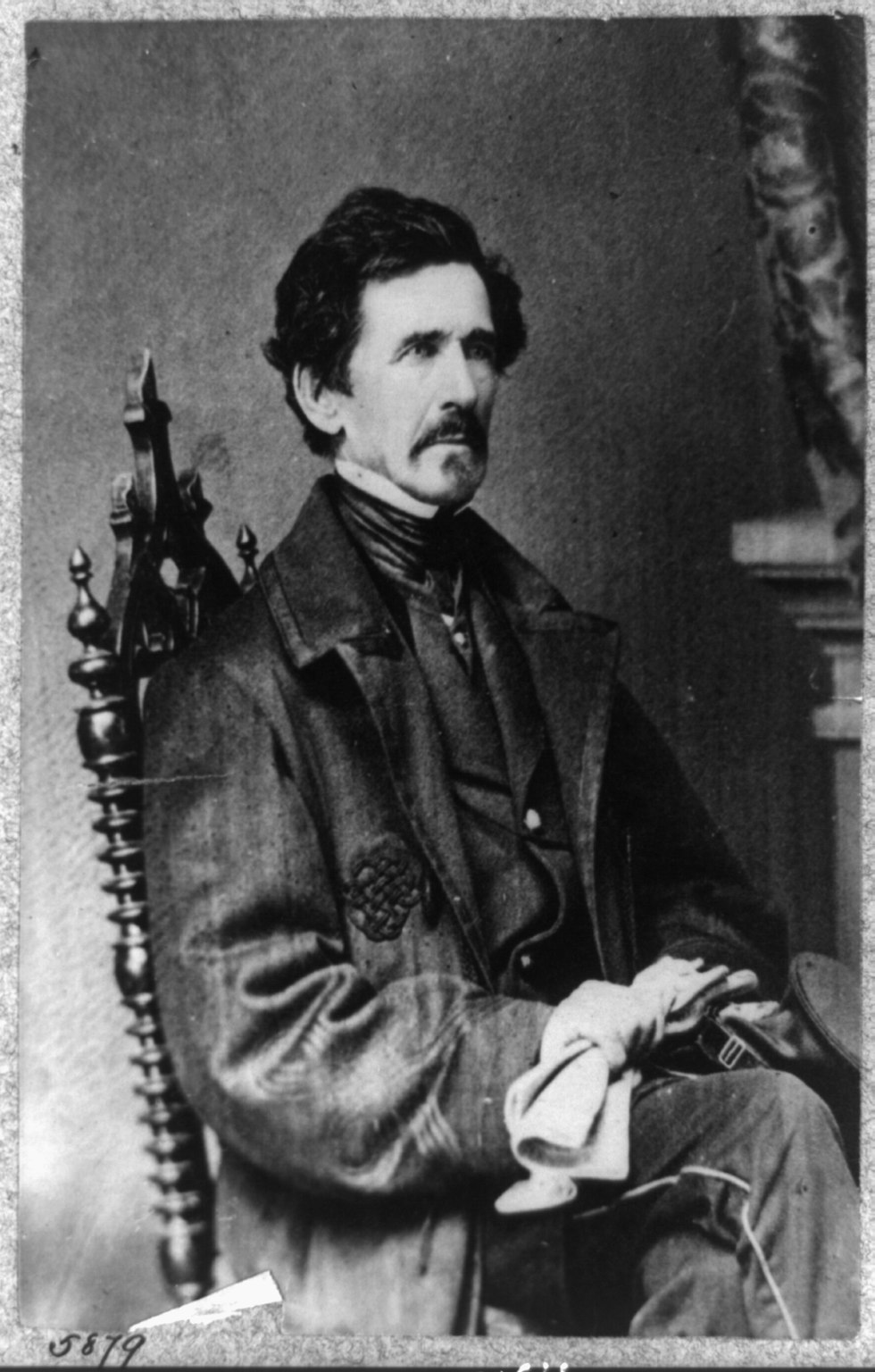
Verplanck Van Antwerp

Verplanck S. Van Antwerp (8 June 1807 – 2 December 1875) was a Brevet Brigadier General in the Union Army during the American Civil War and served as U.S. Land Office Receiver and Secretary to the Commissioner of Indian Affairs.

== Biography ==
Van Antwerp was born 8 June 1807 in Coeymans, New York. In the 1830s and 1840s, he was a United States General Land Office Receiver and Secretary to the Commissioner of Indian Affairs, in Keokuk, Iowa. During the civil war, he served as a Major and aide-de-camp to Major General James G. Blunt from 29 January to 21 March 1862 and was aide-de-camp to John C. Frémont from 19 April 1862. He became assistant inspector-general of the Department of Kansas in May 1862 and became inspector-general of the Army of the Frontier in December. He was promoted to the brevet rank of brigadier-general on 13 February 1865 and mustered out of the army on 1 July 1866. On 28 July he re-enlisted as a captain and military storekeeper.

While serving as a captain and military storekeeper he died at Upper Marlborough, Maryland, on 2 December 1875. He is buried in Trinity Episcopal Churchyard in Upper Marlborough.

== Family ==
Van Antwerp married Jane Maria Yates (1815–1870), daughter of John Van Ness Yates, of Albany, and granddaughter of Robert Yates. They had 4 children:

- Catharine Van Antwerp, born c. March 1831, died c. 1863
- Caroline Van Antwerp, born 16 January 1843, died 15 Jan 1925
- Yates Van Antwerp, born c. 1847
- Jesse F Van Antwerp, born c. January 1850
