= 3rd Kansas Infantry Regiment =

- Active: 1864
- Country: United States
- Allegiance: Union
- Branch: Infantry
- Size: Regiment
- Engagements: American Civil War

The 3rd Kansas Infantry Regiment was an infantry regiment from Kansas that comprised part of James H. Lane's "Kansas Brigade" during the American Civil War. In 1862, the regiment was consolidated with the 4th Regiment Kansas Volunteer Infantry to form the 10th Regiment Kansas Volunteer Infantry.

== Commander ==
- Colonel James Montgomery

== See also ==
- List of Kansas Civil War Units

== Bibliography ==
- Dyer, Frederick H. (1959). A Compendium of the War of the Rebellion. New York and London. Thomas Yoseloff, Publisher. LCCN 59-12963.
- Fox, S. M. (1902). "Roll of the Officers and Enlisted Men of the Third, Fourth, Eighteenth and Nineteenth Kansas Volunteers, 1861". Third and Fourth Kansas Volunteer Regiments, 1861. W.Y. Morgan. pp. 5–98.
