= 5th Kansas Infantry Regiment =

- Active: September 1861 – October 1861
- Country: United States
- Allegiance: Union
- Branch: Infantry

The 5th Kansas Infantry Regiment was an infantry regiment that served in the Union Army during the American Civil War.

== Service ==
Two companies of the 5th Kansas Infantry were organized at Fort Scott, Kansas.

The regiment was attached to Lane's Kansas Brigade.

The 5th Kansas Infantry ceased to exist due to a lack of recruits. Members of the two companies were consolidated with recruits from the 3rd Kansas Infantry and 4th Kansas Infantry (both of which failed to complete organization) to form the 10th Kansas Infantry.

== Detailed service ==
Operations about Fort Scott September and October 1861. Action at Morristown September 17. Osceola September 21–22.

== See also ==
- List of Kansas Civil War Units
- Kansas in the Civil War
