= 10th Kansas Infantry Regiment =

- Active: April 3, 1862 – September 20, 1865
- Disbanded: September 20, 1865
- Allegiance: Union
- Branch: Infantry
- Size: Regiment
- Engagements: American Civil War: Battle of Old Fort Wayne; Battle of Prairie Grove; Second Battle of Franklin; Battle of Nashville; Battle of Fort Blakeley

The 10th Kansas Infantry Regiment served in the Union Army between April 3, 1862, and September 20, 1865, during the American Civil War.

== Service ==
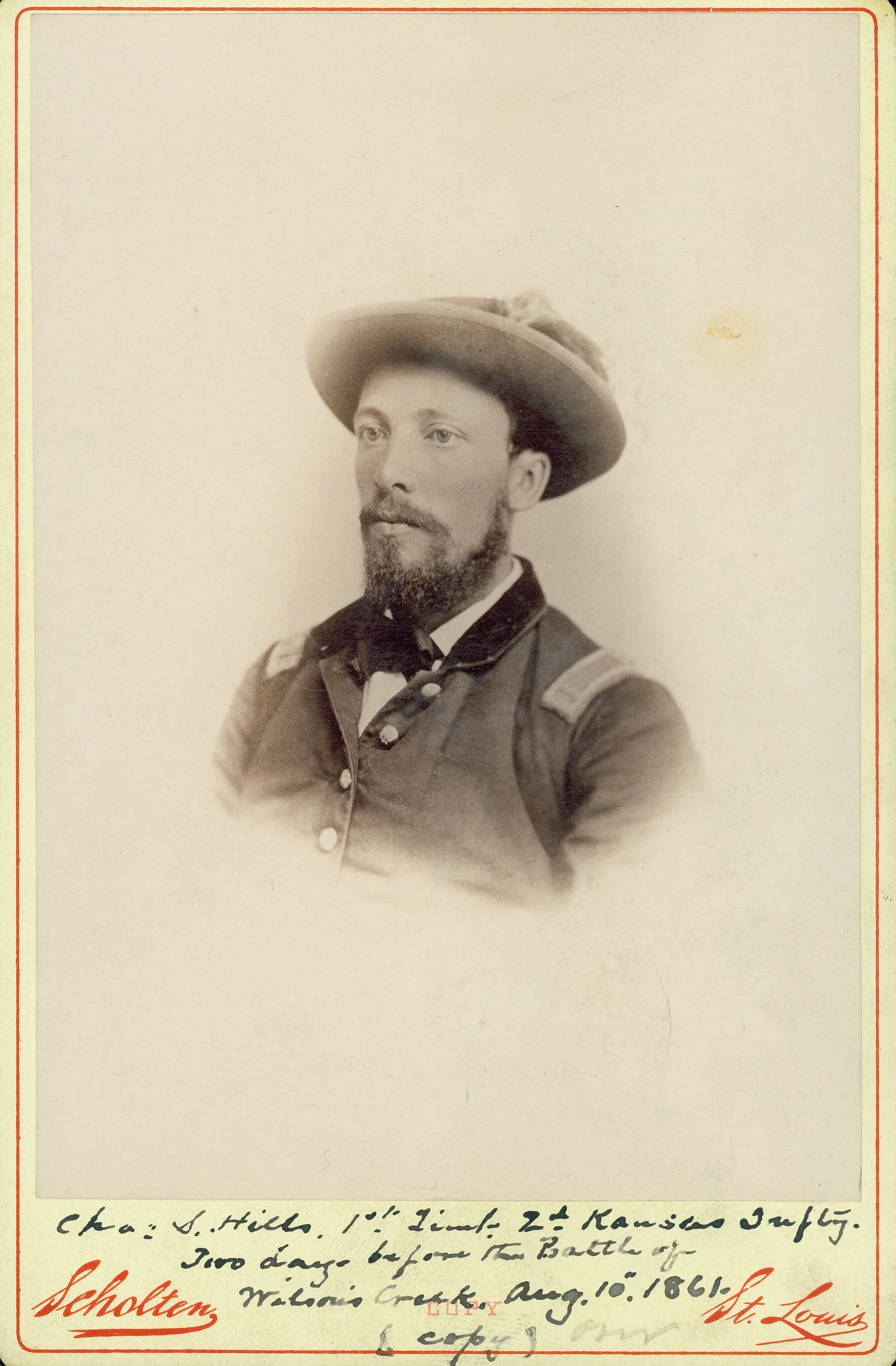
Lieutenant Colonel Charles S. Hills of the 10th Kansas Infantry

The 10th Kansas Infantry Regiment was organized at Paola, Kansas by consolidating the 3rd Kansas Infantry and 4th Kansas Infantry, which had recruits, but were never organized. Some members of the 5th Kansas Infantry were also consolidated into the 10th Kansas Infantry. The regiment mustered in on April 3, 1862, for three years under the command of Colonel William F. Cloud.

The regiment was attached to Department of Kansas to August 1862. 2nd Brigade, Department of Kansas, to October 1862. 2nd Brigade, 1st Division, Army of the Frontier, Department of Missouri, to February 1863. District of Rolla, Department of Missouri, to June 1863. District of St. Louis, Missouri, Department of Missouri, to August 1863. District of Kansas, Department of Missouri, to January 1864. Alton, Illinois, to August 1864. District of St. Louis, Missouri, Department of Missouri, to November 1864. Nashville, Tennessee, Department of the Cumberland, to December 1864. 2nd Brigade, 2nd Division (detachment), Army of the Tennessee, to February 1865. 2nd Brigade, 2nd Division, XVI Corps, Military Division West Mississippi, to August 1865.

The 10th Kansas Infantry mustered out of service at Fort Leavenworth, Kansas, on August 20, 1865, and discharged on September 20, 1865.

== Detailed service ==
Moved to Fort Scott, Kansas, April 1862, and duty there until June 4. Companies on expedition into Indian Territory with the 2nd Ohio Cavalry June 13-August 15. Locust Grove, Cherokee Nation, July 3. Reconnaissance from Grand River to Fort Gibson, Tahlequah and Park Hill, and skirmishes July 14–17. Campaign against Coffey and Cockrell in Missouri August. Jackson County, Missouri, September 15. Newtonia September 30. Occupation of Newtonia October 4. Old Fort Wayne or Beattie's Prairie near Maysville October 22. Cane Hill October 28. Battle of Prairie Grove, Arkansas, December 7. Expedition over Boston Mountains to Van Buren December 27–31. Moved to Springfield, Missouri, January 1863, and duty there until February 27. Near Mount Vernon until March 15. Operations against Shelby until April. Moved to Rolla, Missouri, April 27, then to St. Louis, Missouri, June 4–8. Moved to Indianapolis, Indiana, and return to St. Louis July 18. Moved to Kansas City, Missouri, August, and duty there until January 1864. Skirmish with Quantrill at Paola August 21, 1863 (detachment). Company I detached at St. Louis, Missouri, as provost guard July and August 1863, rejoining at Kansas City. Company K at Topeka, Kan., September to November 1863. Regiment moved to St. Louis, Missouri, January 1864, then to Alton, Illinois, and guard military prison there until August 1864. Non-veterans moved to St. Louis, Missouri, and mustered out August 19–20, 1864. Veterans and recruits consolidated to a battalion of four companies August 15, 1864. On duty at St. Louis, Missouri, until October 20. Moved to Pilot Knob October 20–24, then to Paducah, Kentucky, November 2–12, and to Nashville, Tennessee, November 28–29. Temporarily attached to IV Corps, Army of the Cumberland. Battle of Franklin November 30. Battle of Nashville December 15–16. Pursuit of Hood to the Tennessee River December 17–28. Moved to Eastport, Mississippi, January 4–7, 1865. Reconnaissance to Iuka, Mississippi, January 9. Moved to New Orleans, Louisiana, February 8–21. Campaign against Mobile, Alabama, and its defenses March 17-April 12. Siege of Spanish Fort and Fort Blakeley March 26-April 8. Assault and capture of Fort Blakeley April 9. Occupation of Mobile April 12. March to Montgomery April 13–25. Duty there and in the District of Alabama until August.

== Casualties ==
The regiment lost a total of 146 men during service; 2 officers and 26 enlisted men killed or mortally wounded, 4 officers and 114 enlisted men died of disease.

== Commanders ==
- Colonel William F. Cloud
- Colonel William Weer

== Notable members ==
- Captain James Madison Harvey, Company G - governor of Kansas (1869–1873)
- Private David Lewis Payne, Company F - "Father of Oklahoma"

== Bibliography ==
- Dyer, Frederick H. (1959). A Compendium of the War of the Rebellion. New York and London. Thomas Yoseloff, Publisher. LCCN 59-12963.
