= Battle of Westport order of battle: Union =

Order of battle for the Union Army at the Battle of Westport

The following Union Army units and commanders fought in the Battle of Westport of the American Civil War. The Confederate order of battle is listed separately.

== Command disputes ==
By order of MG Blunt (General Field Orders No. 2) the militia regiments of William H. M. Fishbeck, Brigadier General of Militia, were placed under the command of Charles W. Blair, Colonel of Volunteers; Fishbeck was infuriated that his command had been subordinated to a volunteer officer. Because Kansas law stated that militia should be kept under the command of militia officers, Fishbeck disregarded Blunt's order. Blunt had Fishbeck arrested and held until released by order of MG Curtis. Upon his release, Fishbeck resumed command of the Kansas Militia regiments, with orders to obey directives that came from MG Blunt. This rather cumbersome arrangement had BG Fishbeck in direct command of the militia units attached to the 3rd Brigade, 1st Division, and Col Charles Blair in overall command of the brigade. Howard N. Monnett describes the arrangement as a "brigade within a brigade". Blair and Fishbeck led the militia into action at Westport (accompanied onto the field by MG George W. Dietzler), and then in the subsequent pursuit of Price until MG Curtis ordered the militia to return home.

== Abbreviations used ==
=== Military rank ===
- MG = Major General
- BG = Brigadier General
- Col = Colonel
- Ltc = Lieutenant Colonel
- Maj = Major
- Cpt = Captain
- Lt = 1st Lieutenant
- 2Lt = 2nd Lieutenant

=== Other ===
- w = wounded

== Army of the Border ==
MG Samuel R. Curtis

Staff:

- Aide-de-camp: BG James H. Lane
- Aide-de-camp: Col William F. Cloud
- Chief of Artillery: Maj. Robert H. Hunt
- Asst. Adj. Gen and aide-de-camp: Cpt Richard Hinton
- Volunteer aide-de-camp: Senator Samuel C. Pomeroy
- Signal Corp: 1st Lt. Ira Quinby

Escort:

- 11th Kansas Cavalry, Company G (with 2-gun battery): Lt Edward Gill

Division	Brigade	Regiments and others
Provisional Cavalry Division; MG James G. Blunt	1st Brigade Col Charles R. Jennison	Foster's Missouri Cavalry Battalion: Cpt George S. Grover; 15th Kansas Cavalry: Ltc George H. Hoyt; 3rd Wisconsin Cavalry (detachment): Cpt Robert Carpenter; Battery (5 guns) [manned by 15th Kansas Cavalry]: 2Lt Henry L. Barker
Provisional Cavalry Division; MG James G. Blunt	2nd Brigade Col Thomas Moonlight	5th Kansas Cavalry, Companies L and M: Cpt James H. Young; 11th Kansas Cavalry: Ltc Preston B. Plumb; 16th Kansas Cavalry, Companies A and D: Ltc Samuel Walker; Battery (4 guns) [manned by Company E, 11th Kansas Cavalry]
Provisional Cavalry Division; MG James G. Blunt	3rd Brigade Col Charles W. Blair	4th Kansas Militia: Col W. D. McCain; 5th Kansas Militia: Col G. A. Colton; 6th Kansas Militia: Col James D. Snoddy (arrested Oct. 16); Col James Montgomery; 10th Kansas Militia: Col William Pennock; 19th Kansas Militia: Col A. C. Hogan; 24th Kansas Militia Battalion: Ltc George Eaves; 14th Kansas Cavalry, Company E: Lt William B. Clark; 2nd Kansas State Artillery (2 guns): Lt Daniel C. Knowles; 9th Wisconsin Battery (6 guns): Cpt James H. Dodge
Provisional Cavalry Division; MG James G. Blunt	4th Brigade Col James Hobart Ford	2nd Colorado Cavalry: Maj Jesse L. Pritchard; 16th Regiment Kansas Volunteer Cavalry (detachment): Maj James Ketner; McLain's Independent Colorado Battery (6 guns): Cpt William D. McLain
Kansas State Militia Division; MG George W. Deitzler, Kansas State Adjutant General	Brigade field commanders BG Melvin S. Grant; BG William H. M. Fishback	(not brigaded): 1st Kansas Militia: Col Charles H. Robinson; 2nd Kansas Militia: Col George W. Veale; 2nd Kansas Colored Militia: Cpt James L. Rafferty, Cpt Richard J. Hinton; 7th Kansas Militia: Col Peter McFarland; 9th Kansas Militia: Col Frank M. Tracy; 12th Kansas Militia: Col L. S. Treat; 13th Kansas Militia: Col Alexander S. Johnson; 14th Kansas Militia: Col William Gordon; 18th Kansas Militia: Col Matthew Quigg; 20th Kansas Militia: Col J. B. Hubbell; 21st Kansas Militia: Col Sandy Lowe; 22nd Kansas Militia: Col William Weer; Artillery: Independent Colored Battery (6 guns): Cpt H. Ford Douglas; Topeka Battery of 2nd Kansas Militia (1 gun): Cpt Ross Burnes; Unattached unit: Kansas City Home Guards: Col Kersey Coates

== Department of the Missouri ==
MG William S. Rosecrans

Division	Brigade	Regiments and others
Provisional Cavalry Division; MG Alfred Pleasonton	1st Brigade BG Egbert B. Brown (arrested Oct. 23); Col John F. Philips	1st Missouri Militia Cavalry: Col James McFerran (arrested Oct. 23), Ltc Bazel F. Lazear; 4th Missouri Militia Cavalry: Maj George W. Kelly; 7th Missouri Militia Cavalry: Col John F. Philips, Ltc Thomas Theodore Crittenden; Detachment; 1st Iowa Cavalry: Maj John McDermott
Provisional Cavalry Division; MG Alfred Pleasonton	2nd Brigade BG John McNeil	17th Illinois Cavalry: Col John Lourie Beveridge; 13th Missouri Cavalry: Col Edwin C. Catherwood; 5th Missouri Militia Cavalry: Ltc Joseph Eppstein; Detachments from: 7th Kansas Cavalry: Maj Francis Malone; 2nd Missouri Cavalry: Cpt George M. Houston; 3rd Missouri Militia Cavalry: Ltc Henry M. Matthews; 9th Missouri Militia Cavalry: Ltc Daniel M. Draper
Provisional Cavalry Division; MG Alfred Pleasonton	3rd Brigade BG John B. Sanborn	2nd Arkansas Cavalry: Col John E. Phelps; 8th Missouri Militia Cavalry: Col Joseph J. Gravely; Detachments; 6th Enrolled Missouri Militia Cavalry: Ltc John F. McMahan; 7th Enrolled Missouri Militia Cavalry: Maj W. B. Mitchell; 6th Missouri Militia Cavalry: Maj William Plumb
Provisional Cavalry Division; MG Alfred Pleasonton	4th Brigade Col Edward F. Winslow (w Oct. 23); Ltc Frederick W. Benteen	3rd Iowa Cavalry: Maj Benjamin S. Jones; 4th Iowa Cavalry: Maj Abial Richmond Pierce; 10th Missouri Cavalry: Ltc Frederic W. Benteen, Maj William H. Lusk; Detachments; 7th Indiana Cavalry: Maj Samuel E. W. Simonson; 4th Missouri Cavalry: Cpt George D. Knispel
Provisional Cavalry Division; MG Alfred Pleasonton	Artillery Col Nelson D. Cole	Battery H, 2nd Missouri Light Artillery (4 guns): Cpt William C. F. Montgomery [2 guns commanded by Lt Philip Smiley]; Battery L, 2nd Missouri Light Artillery (4 guns): Cpt Charles H. Thurber; Battery of 5th Missouri Militia Cavalry (2 guns): Lt Adam Hillerich
Provisional Cavalry Division; MG Alfred Pleasonton	Unassigned	2nd New Jersey Cavalry (detachment): Cpt Michael Gallagher; 19th Pennsylvania Cavalry (1 company)

== XVI Corps ==
(detachment of First and Third Divisions; in pursuit, not present at the battle)
MG Andrew Jackson Smith

Division	Brigade	Regiments and others
First Division; Col Joseph J. Woods	2nd Brigade Col Lucius Frederick Hubbard	47th Illinois; 12th Iowa; 5th Minnesota; 7th Minnesota; 9th Minnesota; 10th Minnesota; 8th Wisconsin; Battery G, 2nd Illinois Light Artillery
First Division; Col Joseph J. Woods	3rd Brigade Col Sylvester G. Hill	35th Iowa; 33rd Missouri
Third Division; Col David Moore	1st Brigade Col Thomas J. Kinney	58th Illinois; 119th Illinois; 89th Indiana
Third Division; Col David Moore	2nd Brigade Col James Isham Gilbert	14th Iowa; 27th Iowa; 32nd Iowa; 24th Missouri
Third Division; Col David Moore	3rd Brigade Col Edward H. Wolfe	49th Illinois; 117th Illinois; 52nd Indiana; 178th New York; 3rd Indiana Battery; 9th Indiana Battery
