= Battle of Prairie Grove order of battle: Union =

The following Union Army units and commanders fought in the Battle of Prairie Grove of the American Civil War on December 7, 1862, in Washington County, Arkansas. The Confederate order of battle is listed separately.

== Abbreviations used ==
=== Military rank ===
- MG = Major General
- BG = Brigadier General
- Col = Colonel
- Ltc = Lieutenant Colonel
- Maj = Major
- Cpt = Captain

=== Other ===
- w = wounded
- mw = mortally wounded
- k = killed

== Army of the Frontier ==
MG James G. Blunt 9,216 men on the battlefield

Division	Brigade	Regiments and Others
1st Division; BG James G. Blunt 3,144	1st Brigade BG Frederick Salomon 752	9th Wisconsin Infantry: Col Charles E. Salomon (at Rhea's Mill); 2nd Ohio Cavalry: Col Augustus V. Kautz (at Rhea's Mill); 3rd Wisconsin Cavalry: Col William A. Barstow 333 men; Attached Artillery Section 21 men, two 12 pound mountain howitzers; 6th Kansas Cavalry: Col William R. Judson 180 men; Attached Artillery Section: Lt. Brainard D. Benedict 21 men, two 12 pound mountain howitzers; 9th Kansas Cavalry: Col Edward Lynde 197 men; Attached Artillery Section: Lt. Henry H. Opedyke (at Rhea's Mill); 25th Ohio Battery: Cpt Julius L. Hadley (at Rhea's Mill); 2nd Kansas Battery: Cpt E. A. Smith (at Rhea's Mill)
1st Division; BG James G. Blunt 3,144	2nd Brigade Col William A. Weer 902	3rd Indian Home Guard: Col William A. Phillips 44 men; 10th Kansas Infantry: Maj Henry H. Williams 387 men; 13th Kansas Infantry: Col Thomas M. Bowen 375 men; 1st Kansas Battery: Cpt Marcus D. Tenney 96 men, six 10 pound Parrott rifles
1st Division; BG James G. Blunt 3,144	3rd Brigade Col William F. Cloud 1490	1st Indian Home Guard: Ltc Stephen H. Wattles 337 men; 11th Kansas Infantry: Col Thomas Ewing, Jr. 608 men; 2nd Kansas Cavalry: Ltc Owen A. Bassett 344 men; Attached Artillery Section: Lt Elias S. Stover 22 men, two 12 pound mountain howitzers; 2nd Indiana Battery: Cpt John W. Rabb 126 men, four James rifles, two 6 pound smoothbore cannons; 3rd Kansas Battery: Cpt Henry Hopkins 53 men, three 6 pound smoothbore cannons, one 12 pound field howitzer
2nd Division; Col Daniel Huston, Jr. 2118	1st Brigade Col John G. Clark 938	18th Iowa Infantry: Col John Edwards (at Springfield); 26th Indiana Infantry: Col John G. Clark 445 men; 7th Missouri Cavalry: Maj Eliphalet Bredett (k) 453 men; Battery A, 2nd Illinois Light Artillery: Lt H. Borris 40 men, one 6 pound smoothbore cannon, one 12 pound field howitzer
2nd Division; Col Daniel Huston, Jr. 2118	2nd Brigade Col William Dye 1175	20th Iowa Infantry: Ltc Joseph B. Leake 293 men; 37th Illinois Infantry: Ltc John C. Black (w) 401 men; 1st Missouri Cavalry: Maj Charles Banzhaf 165 men; 6th Missouri Cavalry: Maj Samuel Montgomery 206 men; Battery F, 1st Missouri Light Artillery: Cpt David Murphy 110 men, four 3-inch Ordnance rifles, two James rifles
3rd Division; BG Francis J. Herron 3950	1st Brigade Ltc Henry Bertram 1765	20th Wisconsin Infantry: Maj Henry A. Starr 436 men; (*) 1st Iowa Cavalry: Maj J. O. Gower 500 men; (*) 2nd Wisconsin Cavalry: Maj William H. Miller 88 men; (*) 10th Illinois Cavalry: Ltc James Stuart 612 men; Attached Artillery Battery 43 men, four 12 pound mountain howitzers; Battery L, 1st Missouri Light Artillery: Cpt Frank Backof 86 men, four James rifles, two 12 pound field howitzers
3rd Division; BG Francis J. Herron 3950	2nd Brigade Col William W. Orme 1600	19th Iowa Infantry: Ltc Samuel McFarland (k) 500 men; 94th Illinois Infantry: Ltc John McNulta 589 men; (*) 8th Missouri Cavalry: Col Washington Geiger 400 men; Battery E, 1st Missouri Light Artillery: Lt Joseph Foust 111 men, four 10 pound Parrott rifles, two 3-inch Ordnance rifles
	Unattached 585	14th Missouri State Militia Cavalry: Col John M. Richardson 100 men; 1st Arkansas Cavalry: Col Marcus LaRue Harrison 485 men
