= Army of the Border =

The Army of the Border was a Union army during the American Civil War. It was created from units in the Department of Kansas to oppose Sterling Price's Raid in 1864. Samuel R. Curtis was in command of the army throughout its duration.

== 10-23 October ==
Major General James G. Blunt, who commanded the District of South Kansas, was placed in command of the army's 1st Division, which was broken up into three brigade of volunteer cavalry regiments and a fourth of Kansas state militia units. Major General George Dietzler commanded the rest of the Kansas state militia units and organized them into the 2nd Division of the army.

Jennison's and Moonlight's brigades from Blunt's division fought at the battles of Lexington and Little Blue River. At the battle of Big Blue River Blunt's brigades of Jennison, Moonlight, and Ford were joined by the Olathe District Brigade of the Kansas State Militia brigade led by Melvin S. Grant.

At the Battle of Westport, Blunt's division was deployed east–west with the Kansas State Militia generally supporting the right hand of the line. Curtis's divisions were joined by Alfred Pleasonton's cavalry division from the Department of the Missouri, bringing the Union army to about 22,000, including Pleasonton's cavalry.

== 24 October-7 November ==
Immediately following the Battle of Westport on October 23, the militia units were returned to their respective counties and Curtis reorganized the remaining field units. General William Rosecrans had taken part in the pursuit of Price thus far but remained at his headquarters in Independence and relinquished Pleasonton's division to Curtis' command. Therefore, the Army of the Border was now organized into two cavalry divisionss; Maj. Gen. Blunt commanded the 1st Division and Maj. Gen. Pleasonton commanded the 2d Division.

Two days later Pleasonton's division fought three separate battles: Battle of Marais des Cygnes, Battle of Mine Creek, and Battle of Marmiton River. Blunt's division fought Price in the last major battle of the campaign at Newtonia.

== Commander ==
- Major General Samuel R. Curtis (October 14 – November 8, 1864)

== Major battles and campaigns ==
- Price's Missouri Expedition
  - Second Battle of Lexington (only Blunt's 1st Division was involved)
  - Battle of Little Blue River
  - Battle of Byram's Ford
  - Battle of Westport
  - Battle of Mine Creek (only Pleasonton's 2nd Division was involved)
  - Second Battle of Newtonia (only Blunt's 1st Division was involved)

=== Abbreviations used ===
==== Military rank ====
- MG = Major General
- BG = Brigadier General
- Col = Colonel
- Ltc = Lieutenant Colonel
- Maj = Major
- Cpt = Captain
- Lt = 1st Lieutenant
- 2Lt = 2nd Lieutenant

=== Army of the Border ===
MG Samuel Ryan Curtis

Escort:

- 2nd Kansas Cavalry (battalion): Maj Henry Hopkins
- Company G, 11th Kansas Cavalry: Cpt C. L. Gove
- Company H, 15th Kansas Cavalry
- Mountain howitzer battery: Lt Edward Gill

Division	Brigade	Regiments and Others
First Provisional Cavalry Division; MG James G. Blunt; Escort: Company E, 14th Kansas Cavalry: 2Lt William B. Clark	1st Brigade Col Charles R. Jennison	15th Kansas Cavalry: Ltc George H. Hoyt; 3rd Wisconsin Cavalry (5 companies): Lt James B. Pond; Foster's Battalion, Provisional Enrolled Missouri Militia: Cpt George S. Grover; Mountain howitzer battery (5 12-pdr): 2Lt Henry L. Barker
First Provisional Cavalry Division; MG James G. Blunt; Escort: Company E, 14th Kansas Cavalry: 2Lt William B. Clark	2nd Brigade Col Thomas Moonlight	11th Kansas Militia Infantry: Col A. J. Mitchell; Companies L & M, 5th Kansas Cavalry; 11th Kansas Cavalry (9 companies): Ltc Preston B. Plumb; Companies A & D, 16th Kansas Cavalry; Mountain howitzer battery (4 12-pdr) [manned by Company E, 11th Kansas Cavalry]
First Provisional Cavalry Division; MG James G. Blunt; Escort: Company E, 14th Kansas Cavalry: 2Lt William B. Clark	3rd Brigade [Kansas State Militia Division] Col Charles W. Blair; BG William H. M. Fishbeck	6th Kansas Militia Infantry: Col James Montgomery; Eves' Battalion Kansas Militia Cavalry: Ltc George Eves; 2nd Kansas Light Artillery, Right Section: Lt Daniel C. Knowles; 9th Wisconsin Battery: Cpt James H. Dodge
First Provisional Cavalry Division; MG James G. Blunt; Escort: Company E, 14th Kansas Cavalry: 2Lt William B. Clark	4th Brigade Col James Hobart Ford	2nd Colorado Cavalry: Maj J. H. Pritchard; 16th Kansas Cavalry (detachment); McLain's Independent Colorado Battery (6 guns): Cpt W. D. McLain

Division	Brigade	Regiments and Others
Second Division; MG Alfred Pleasonton; Escort: Company A, 11th Kansas Cavalry: Cpt Henry E. Palmer	1st Brigade Col John Finis Philips	1st Missouri State Militia Cavalry: Ltc Bazel F. Lazear; 4th Missouri State Militia Cavalry: Maj George W. Kelly; 7th Missouri State Militia Cavalry: Ltc Thomas Theodore Crittenden
Second Division; MG Alfred Pleasonton; Escort: Company A, 11th Kansas Cavalry: Cpt Henry E. Palmer	2nd Brigade BG John McNeil	17th Illinois Cavalry: Col John Lourie Beveridge; 7th Kansas Cavalry: Maj Francis M. Malone; 2nd Missouri Cavalry: Cpt George M. Houston; 13th Missouri Cavalry: Col Edwin C. Catherwood; 3rd Missouri State Militia Cavalry: Ltc Henry M. Matthews; 5th Missouri State Militia Cavalry: Ltc Joseph A. Eppstein; 9th Missouri State Militia Cavalry: Ltc Daniel M. Draper; Battery B, 2nd Missouri Light Artillery; Mountain howitzer battery (4 12-pdr)
Second Division; MG Alfred Pleasonton; Escort: Company A, 11th Kansas Cavalry: Cpt Henry E. Palmer	3rd Brigade BG John Benjamin Sanborn	2nd Arkansas Cavalry: Col John Elisha Phelps; 6th Missouri State Militia Cavalry: Maj William Plumb; 8th Missouri State Militia Cavalry: Col Joseph J. Gravely; 6th Provisional Enrolled Missouri Militia: Col John F. McMahan; 7th Provisional Enrolled Missouri Militia: Maj W. B. Mitchell; Battery H, 2nd Missouri Light Artillery: Cpt William C. F. Montgomery; Battery L, 2nd Missouri Light Artillery: Cpt Charles H. Thurber
Second Division; MG Alfred Pleasonton; Escort: Company A, 11th Kansas Cavalry: Cpt Henry E. Palmer	4th Brigade Ltc Frederick William Benteen	7th Indiana Cavalry: Maj S. W. Simonson; 3rd Iowa Cavalry: Maj Benjamin S. Jones; 4th Iowa Cavalry: Maj Abial R. Pierce; 4th Missouri Cavalry (detachment): Cpt Charles D. Knispel [command combined with the 7th Indiana Cavalry]; 10th Missouri Cavalry: Maj William H. Lusk

== See also ==
- Westport Union order of battle
- Mine Creek Union order of battle

== Notes ==
The list shown is the entire Army of the Border. Brigades from this army fought in battles during Price's Raid.
