= 6th Kansas Militia Infantry Regiment =

- Active: October 9 – October 29, 1864
- Disbanded: October 29, 1864
- Allegiance: Union
- Branch: Infantry
- Type: Militia
- Size: Regiment
- Engagements: American Civil War: Price's Raid; Battle of Byram's Ford; Battle of Westport

The 6th Kansas Militia Regiment was a militia regiment that served in the Union Army during the American Civil War. Mobilized on October 9 in response to Price's Missouri Expedition, the unit was originally commanded by Colonel James D. Snoddy. After the regiment was sent into Missouri as part of the division of Major General James G. Blunt, Snoddy attempted to lead it back to Kansas, which led to his arrest. Veteran officer James Montgomery replaced Snoddy. The regiment may have been lightly engaged at the Battle of Byram's Ford on October 22, and fought in the Battle of Westport the next day. The regiment was disbanded on October 29, the crisis having passed.

== Service ==
The 6th Kansas Militia was mobilized on October 9, 1864, in response to Price's Missouri Expedition, the Governor of Kansas, Thomas Carney, having ordered the mobilization of the state militia that day. Major General Samuel R. Curtis, who was commanding the Union response to Price's campaign, declared martial law the following day. There were 530 or 550 to 650 men from the 6th Kansas Militia in field service, who were drawn from Linn County. Linn County was on the Missouri–Kansas border. The regiment's muster roll lists 788 men in the unit, but only the unit's mounted men were sent into the field, with the remainder staying behind in Mound City. The regiment was originally commanded by Colonel James D. Snoddy, a partisan newspaper editor. Curtis assigned the regiment to the division of Union Army Major General James G. Blunt, who Snoddy was politically opposed to. Blunt was politically affiliated with United States Senator James H. Lane; one of Snoddy's last acts before taking the field was to publish statements in his newspaper which alledged that Lane engaged in "the prostitution of public trusts" and "unblushing licentiousness everywhere". Blunt assigned the 6th Kansas Militia to the brigade of Colonel Charles W. Blair, but Snoddy instead insisted on taking orders through militia Brigadier General William Fishback.

Along with the 5th Kansas Militia Infantry Regiment and the 10th Kansas Militia Infantry Regiment, the 6th Kansas Militia was advanced to Hickman Mills, Missouri, in advance of the other militia units. At this time, there was not direct contact between Price's Confederate troops and the Kansas militia, which fed an environment of political intrigue surrounding the militia callout. On the night of October 15/16, Fishback and the three militia regimental commanders at Hickman Mills, whose units were more poorly equipped and supplied than those remaining in Kansas, determined to march their troops back to Kansas. The 6th Kansas Militia led the way back to Kansas, but Blunt had mobilized a force at a creek crossing only 1 mile (1.6 km) from Hickman Mills to intercept the movement. Snoddy (and later Fishback) were arrested, and late on October 16, the 6th Kansas Militia elected veteran officer James Montgomery as its new colonel. Two days later, Blair's brigade was sent to the Big Blue River; meanwhile the rest of Blunt's force fought the Second Battle of Lexington on October 19 and the Battle of Little Blue River on October 21. While the 6th Kansas Militia remained on the Big Blue River, Montgomery trained the men and the regiment's unarmed men were issued weapons. Late on October 21, Curtis prepared his defenses along the Big Blue River for the impending Confederate attack. Blair's brigade was on Curtis's left. During the Battle of Byram's Ford, Confederate forces feinted in the direction of Blair's portion of the line, but the main blow was struck against Curtis's right. The 6th Kansas Militia may have been lightly engaged during the Confederate feint, but did not see significant action during the main stage of the battle. Blair's brigade's horses had been sent back to Kansas City earlier in the campaign, and the men had to retreat on foot when the Union were defeated.

The 6th Kansas Militia was part of Curtis's reserve before the Battle of Westport on October 23. During the fighting, Blunt moved troops to protect his right flank, and the 6th and 10th Kansas Militia were brought up to fill the gap created, although the men of the 6th Kansas Militia had not eaten in over a day. The men of the 6th Kansas Militia fought from behind cover in a defensive position, with the historian Kyle Sinisi writing that the soldiers (along with those of the 19th Kansas Militia Infantry Regiment) "acquitted themselves well in the ensuing firefight", although Blunt later withdrew his division after it came under enfilading Confederate artillery fire. After the battle, the Union troops pursued the Confederates as they retreated through Kansas. Blunt drove his men, including the 6th Kansas Militia, hard in pursuit of the Confederate forces on October 23 and 24. Most of the militia units lost all structural integrity during the forced march, with many of the men simply going home. The 6th Kansas Militia marched on foot during October 23, but the unit's horses were brought up to the regiment that night and the men were remounted. By the end of October 24, the 6th Kansas Militia, another militia battalion, and some artillery was all that remained of Blair's brigade. Blair turned command of the brigade over to another officer and joined Curtis's staff as an aide. Curtis revoked the martial law declaration on October 25. On October 27, the governor ordered that the Kansas militia be disbanded by their commanders after being marched to the counties from which their soldiers were raised. Montgomery and the 6th Kansas Militia were not actively engaged in the remaining battles of the campaign: Marias des Cygnes, Mine Creek, and Marmiton River on October 25, or the Second Battle of Newtonia on October 28. The 6th Kansas Militia was disbanded on October 29, 1864.

== See also ==
- List of Kansas Civil War Units

== Sources ==
- Buresh, Lumir F. (1977). October 25th and the Battle of Mine Creek. Kansas City, Missouri: The Lowell Press. ISBN 0-913504-40-8.
- Collins, Charles D. Jr. (2016). Battlefield Atlas of Price's Missouri Expedition of 1864 (PDF). Fort Leavenworth, Kansas: Combat Studies Institute Press. ISBN 978-1-940804-27-9.
- Conner, Robert C. (2023). James Montgomery, Abolitionist Warrior. Havertown, Pennsylvania: Casemate. ISBN 978-1-63624-142-5.
- Dyer, Frederick H. (1908). A Compendium of the War of the Rebellion. Des Moines, Iowa: Dyer Publishing Company. OCLC 8697590.
- Petherbridge, J. C., ed. (1902). Kansas State Militia, 1864. Kansas City, Missouri: Frank T. Riley Pub. Co. OCLC 1043924659.
- Sinisi, Kyle S. (2020) [2015]. The Last Hurrah: Sterling Price's Missouri Expedition of 1864 (paperback ed.). Lanham, Maryland: Rowman & Littlefield. ISBN 978-1-5381-4151-9.
