= 3rd Independent Battery Kansas Light Artillery =

- Active: October 27, 1862 – January 19, 1865
- Country: United States
- Allegiance: Union
- Branch: Artillery
- Nicknames: Hopkin's Battery, Kansas Light Artillery
- Equipment: 3 6-pdr smoothbore, 1 12-pdr field howitzer 6 3" Parrott rifles (June 1864)
- Engagements: Battle of Prairie Grove; Battle of Honey Springs

3rd Independent Battery Kansas Light Artillery was an artillery battery that served in the Union Army during the American Civil War.

== Service ==
The battery was originally recruited by Henry Hopkins and John F. Aduddell in late 1861, but was ultimately organized as Company B, 2nd Kansas Cavalry. It was reorganized as artillery on October 27, 1862, with guns captured at the Battle of Old Fort Wayne and designated as Hopkins' Battery Kansas Light Artillery, which was only meant to be a temporary assignment. The designation was officially changed to 3rd Kansas Battery on October 1, 1863, by order of the War Department.

The battery was attached to 3rd Brigade, 1st Division, Army of the Frontier, Department of the Missouri, October 1862 to February 1863. District of Northwest Arkansas, Department of the Missouri, to June 1863. District of the Frontier, Department of the Missouri, to December 1863. 3rd Brigade, District Frontier, Department of the Missouri, to January 1864. 3rd Brigade, District of the Frontier, VII Corps, Department of Arkansas, to January 1865.

The 3rd Kansas Battery mustered out of service at Fort Leavenworth, Kansas, on January 19, 1865. At that time, veterans and recruits (45 men) in the battery were transferred to the 2nd Kansas Battery.

== Detailed service ==
Occupation of Newtonia October 4, 1862. Hazel Bottom October 14. Shell's Mill October 16. Cane Hill November 28. Battle of Prairie Grove, Arkansas, December 7. Expedition over Boston Mountains to Van Buren December 27–31. At Rhea's Mills January 1, 1863. Ordered to Fort Gibson February, arriving March 1, and duty there until July 17, 1863. Action at Webber's Falls April 28. Honey Springs July 1. At Webber's Falls and Scullyville until September. March to Van Buren September 2, and duty there until January 1865. (A detachment of 60 men were sent to Little Rock on September 13, 1864, to receive a new battery and remained on duty there until January 1, 1865. Attached to Battery G, 1st Missouri Light Artillery, September 13, 1864, to January 1, 1865.)

== Casualties ==
The battery lost a total of 20 men during service; 2 enlisted men killed or mortally wounded, 18 enlisted men died of disease.

== Commanders ==
- Captain Henry Hopkins
- Captain John F. Aduddell

== See also ==
- List of Kansas Civil War Units
- Kansas in the Civil War
