= 2nd Kansas Militia Infantry Regiment =

Infantry regiment during the American Civil War

2nd Kansas Militia Regiment
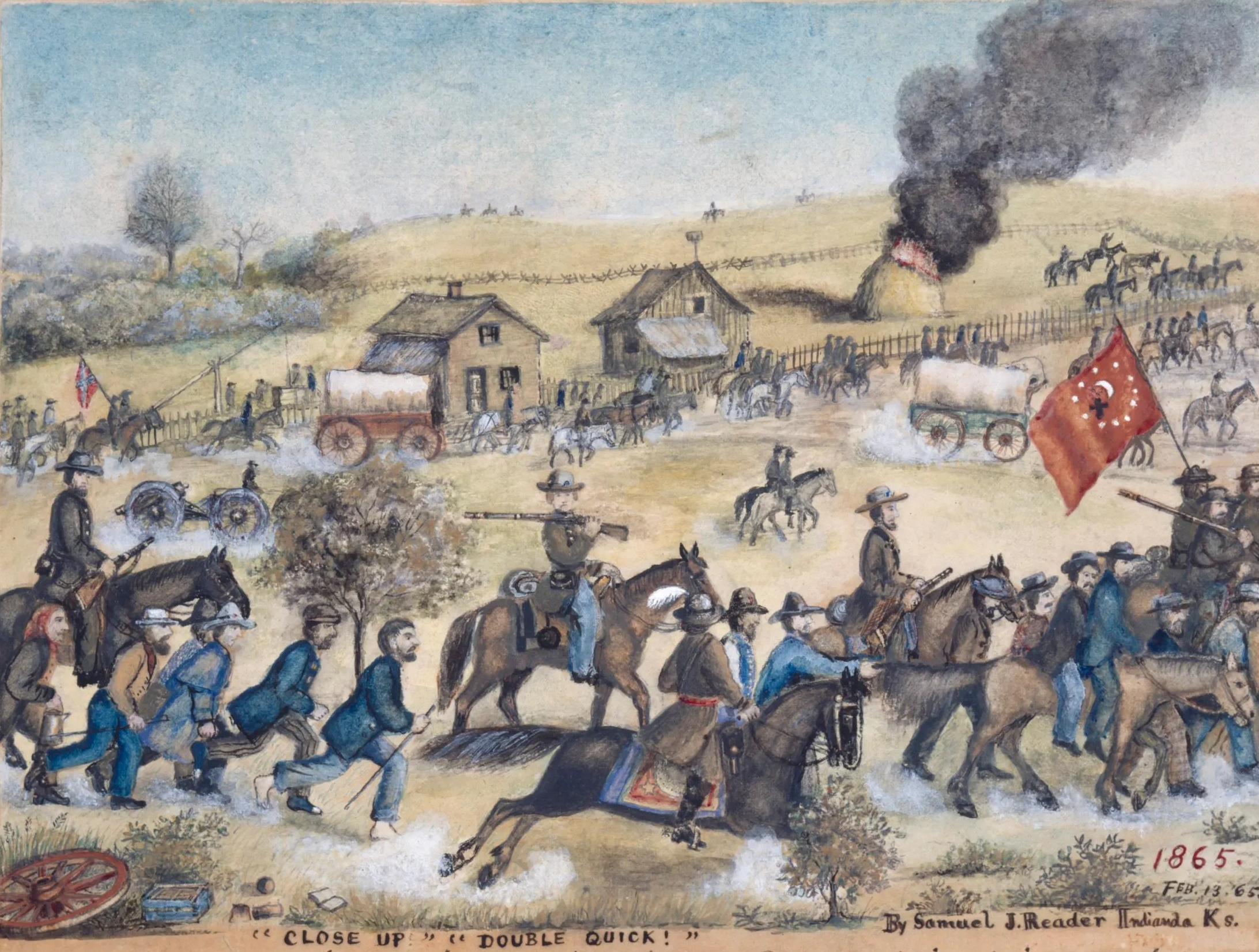
- Members of the regiment on the way to Camp Ford prisoner of war camp, near Tyler, Texas, in October 1864
- Active: 1864
- Disbanded: October 29, 1864
- Country: United States
- Allegiance: Kansas
- Type: Militia
- Size: Regiment
- Home station: Shawnee County
- Facings: Light blue
- Engagements: American Civil War: Battle of the Blue

Commanders
- Commanding Officer: Colonel George W. Veale

The 2nd Kansas Militia Regiment was a formation of Kansas State Militia during the American Civil War commanded by Colonel George W. Veale.

== History ==
The 2nd Regiment of Kansas State Militia was organized in Shawnee County, Kansas, on October 12, 1864, to defend the state against Price's Missouri Raid. The regiment consisted of 561 men, many mounted on their own farm horses. It rode into Missouri on October 21 in anticipation of Price's arrival where they met with other federal troops and militias from Kansas and Missouri to join with the Army of the Border. On October 22, the Confederates arrived at the edge of Mockbee Farm where federal forces were waiting. The Confederates scattered the militia, many of whom retreated towards Westport (present-day Kansas City). This would lead to the Battle of Westport, where Price's military efforts would largely collapse. Several men were captured by Confederate forces after the battle at Mockbee Farm and marched south. The regiment was disbanded on October 29, 1864.

== Notable members ==
- Samuel J. Reader
- Floyd Perry Baker

== See also ==
- List of Kansas Civil War units
