= 9th Kansas Cavalry Regiment =

- Active: March 27, 1862 – July 17, 1865
- Country: United States
- Allegiance: Union
- Branch: Cavalry
- Engagements: First Battle of Newtonia; Battle of Prairie Grove

The 9th Kansas Cavalry Regiment was a cavalry regiment that served in the Union Army during the American Civil War.

== Service ==
The 9th Kansas Cavalry Regiment was organized at Fort Leavenworth, Kansas on March 27, 1862, by consolidation of several "independent battalions", squadrons, and detachments originally formed for other regiments. Company A organized as Company D, 8th Kansas Infantry, September 13 to October 14, 1861; Company B as Company H, 8th Kansas Infantry, September 21 to November 20, 1861; Company C as Company C, 3rd Kansas Infantry, July 24, 1861; Company D as Company D 1st Battalion Kansas Cavalry, October 19, 1861, to January 16, 1863; Company E as Company E, 1st Battalion Kansas Cavalry, October 19, 1861, to January 16, 1862. Company F organized as Kansas Home Guard October 19, 1861, to January 16, 1862, and on scout and patrol duty at Paola, Kansas. Company G for 1st Battalion Kansas Cavalry September 9, 1861 to January 16, 1862. Company H for 1st Battalion Kansas Cavalry October 22, 1861; Company I mustered in March 6, 1862. Company K mustered in July 11, 1862. Company L mustered in May 2, 1863, and Company M mustered in June 11 to August 2, 1863. The regiment mustered in for three years under the command of Colonel Edward Lynde.

The regiment was attached to Department of Kansas to August 1862. 1st Brigade, Department of Kansas, to October 1862. 1st Brigade, 1st Division, Army of the Frontier, Department of Missouri, to June 1863. District of the Frontier, Department of Missouri, to July 1864. District of the Border, Department of Missouri, to January 1864. Department of Kansas to May 1864. 3rd Brigade, District of the Frontier, VII Corps, Department of Arkansas, to September 1864. 4th Brigade, Cavalry Division, VII Corps, to January 1865. Unattached, VII Corps, Little Rock, Arkansas, to July 1865.

The 9th Kansas Cavalry mustered out of service at Little Rock, Arkansas, on July 17, 1865.

== Detailed service ==
1861. Company C had participated in skirmish at Medoc, Missouri, August 23, 1861; Bell's and Morse's Mills August 28–29; Drywood Creek, Fort Scott, September 2; Morristown, Missouri, September 17, and Osceola, Missouri, September 22. Companies G and H on expedition from Morristown to Dayton and Rose Hill, Missouri,

1862. January 1–3, 1862. Operations in Johnson and LaFayette Counties, Missouri, January 5–12. Columbus, Missouri, January 9. Companies A, B, C, G, and I detached June 10, 1862. Company A on escort duty to Fort Union, New Mexico. Company B in mountains near Denver and built Fort Halleck. Company C to Fort Riley, Kansas; Company G to Fort Lyon, Colorado, and Company I to Fort Laramie. Locust Grove, Cherokee Nation, July 3, 1862. (Companies D, E, F, and H). Operations against Coffey August. March to Sarcoxie. Blunt's Campaign in Missouri and Arkansas August to December. Reconnaissance to Newtonia September 28–29. Newtonia September 30. Occupation of Newtonia October 4. Cane Hill, Boston Mountains, November 28. Battle of Prairie Grove, Arkansas, December 7. Expedition over Boston Mountains to Van Buren December 27–31.

1863. Cane Hill January 2, 1863 (Company H). Spring River, Missouri, February 19 (Company D). Fort Halleck, Dakota Territory, February 20 (Company B). Regiment moved to Fort Scott escorting supply trains February 1863. Stationed along borders of Kansas operating against guerrillas March 1863 to March 1864 (Companies A, D, E, F, and K). Expedition from Humboldt to Cottonwood April 10, 1863 (Company G). Scout in Bates and Cass Counties May 3–11. Hog Island May 18 (Companies C, E, and K). Westport June 17 (Companies E and K). Blue River June 18 (Company K). Cabin Creek July 1–2. Grand Pass, Indian Territory, July 7 (Company B). Honey Springs, Kansas, July 17 (Company C). Taylor's Farm, Little Blue, August 1. Brooklyn, Kansas, August 21 (Company K). At Trading Post (Companies E and G), Harrisonville, Aubrey County (Company K), Pleasant Hill (Company D) and Westport (Company H) operating against guerrillas. Company C rejoined from Fort Riley August 1863. Pursuit of Quantrill August 20–28. Brooklyn August 28. Scout from Coldwater Grove to Pleasant Hill and Big Creek and skirmishes September 4–7 (Companies D, E, and G). Jackson County September 15. Baxter Springs October 10. Pursuit of Shelby toward Warrensburg. Harrisonville October 24 (Company G). Carthage October 18.

1864. Regiment assembled and ordered to Fort Smith via Springfield, Missouri, April 3, 1864. Duty at Fort Smith until July. (Company F stationed at Van Buren May 23.) Hahn's Farm, near Waldron, June 19. Near Fayetteville June 24 (Company C). Operations in Arkansas July 1–31. Frog Bayou July 1. Moved to Little Rock July 2–14. Duty there and at Duvall's Bluff until July 1865. Bull's Bayou August 26, 1864. Bull Creek August 27 (Company I). Expedition in pursuit of Shelby August 27-September 6. Whittier's Mills October 8. Reconnaissance from Little Rock to Princeton October 19–23. Hurricane Creek October 23. Expedition from Brownsville to Cotton Plant October 26-November 3. Scout from DeValls Bluff to West Point November 16–18. Expedition from DeValls Bluff up White River December 13–15. Duty in Arkansas until July 1865.

== Kaw in the regiment ==
Company L of the 9th Cavalry Regiment was made up of Kaw (Kanza) Native Americans who lived in Kansas. Eighty-seven Kaw served in Company L during the war and 24 died in service. An additional, 57 Kaw served in the 9th Cavalry regiment as scouts and 21 died in service. A report said, "A finer body of men was never seen and the officers of this regiment say they are the best and most reliable scouts, and most splendid horsemen."

== Casualties ==
The regiment lost a total of 195 men during service; 1 officer and 52 enlisted men killed or mortally wounded, 2 officers and 140 enlisted men died of disease.

== Commanders ==
- Colonel Edward Lynde

== Notable members ==
- 1st Lieutenant Matthew Cowley, Company I - Namesake of Cowley County, Kansas, died at Little Rock, Arkansas, on 7 Oct 1864.

== See also ==
- List of Kansas Civil War Units
- Kansas in the Civil War
