= Battle of Prairie Grove order of battle =

The order of battle for the Battle of Prairie Grove includes:

- Battle of Prairie Grove order of battle: Confederate
- Battle of Prairie Grove order of battle: Union
