= Leavenworth State Guard =

- Active: October 9, 1864 – October 29, 1864
- Country: United States
- Allegiance: Union
- Branch: Infantry

The Leavenworth State Guard was a militia infantry unit that served in the Union Army during the American Civil War.

== History ==
The Leavenworth State Guard was called into service to defend Kansas against Maj. Gen. Sterling Price's raid on October 9, 1864, and was on duty at Fort Leavenworth. It was disbanded on October 29, 1864.

== See also ==
- List of Kansas Civil War Units
- Kansas in the Civil War
