= 17th Kansas Infantry Regiment =

- Active: July 28, 1864 – November 16, 1864
- Country: United States
- Allegiance: Union
- Branch: Infantry

The 17th Kansas Infantry Regiment was an infantry regiment that served in the Union Army during the American Civil War.

== Service ==
The 17th Kansas Infantry was organized at Camp Deitzler in Leavenworth, Kansas. Only five companies mustered in on July 28, 1864, at Fort Leavenworth for 100 days under the command of Lieutenant Colonel Samuel Adams Drake. The regiment was attached to District of North Kansas.

The 17th Kansas Infantry mustered out November 16, 1864.

== Detailed service ==
Company A ordered to Fort Riley, Company C to Cottonwood Falls and Company D to Lawrence. Operations against Price October–November. March to relief of Mound City.

== Casualties ==
The regiment lost a total of 4 enlisted men during service, all due to disease.

== Commanders ==
- Lieutenant Colonel Samuel Adams Drake

== See also ==
- List of Kansas Civil War Units
- Kansas in the Civil War
