= 13th Kansas Militia Infantry Regiment =

13th Regiment Kansas Militia Infantry
- Active: October 9, 1864 – October 29, 1864
- Country: United States
- Allegiance: Union
- Branch: Infantry
- Engagements: Battle of Byram's Ford; Battle of Westport

The 13th Kansas Militia Infantry was an infantry regiment that served in the Union Army during the American Civil War.

== Service ==
The 13th Kansas Militia Infantry was called into service on October 9, 1864. It was disbanded on October 29, 1864.

== Detailed service ==
The unit was called into service to defend Kansas against Maj. Gen. Sterling Price's raid. The regiment saw action at Byram's Ford, Big Blue, October 22. Westport October 23.

== Commander ==
- Colonel Alexander S. Johnson

== See also ==
- List of Kansas Civil War Units
- Kansas in the Civil War
