= Leavenworth Colored Militia Infantry =

- Active: October 9, 1864 – October 29, 1864
- Country: United States
- Allegiance: Union
- Branch: Infantry

The Leavenworth Colored Militia Infantry was a segregated African American militia infantry regiment that served in the Union Army during the American Civil War.

== Service ==
The Leavenworth Colored Militia Infantry was called into service to defend Kansas against Maj. Gen. Sterling Price's raid on October 9, 1864. It was on duty at Fort Leavenworth. After the defeat of Price the unit was disbanded on October 29.

== Commanders ==
- Captain James L. Rafferty
- Captain Richard J. Hinton

== See also ==
- List of Kansas Civil War Units
- Kansas in the Civil War
