= 13th Kansas Infantry Regiment =

- Active: September 20, 1862 – July 13, 1865
- Country: United States
- Allegiance: Union
- Branch: Infantry
- Engagements: First Battle of Newtonia; Battle of Prairie Grove

The 13th Kansas Infantry Regiment was an infantry regiment that served in the Union Army during the American Civil War.

== Service ==
The 13th Kansas Infantry Regiment was organized on September 10, 1862, at Camp Stanton in Atchison, Kansas. It mustered in on September 20, 1862, for three years under the command of Colonel Thomas Mead Bowen.

The regiment was attached to 2nd Brigade, 1st Division, Army of the Frontier, Department of Missouri, to February 1863. District of Southwest Missouri, Department of Missouri, to June 1863. District of the Frontier, Department of Missouri, to December 1863. 3rd Brigade, District of the Frontier, Department of Missouri, to January 1864. 3rd Brigade, District of the Frontier, VII Corps, Department of Arkansas, to February 1865. 1st Brigade, 3rd Division, VII Corps, February 1865. 1st Brigade, 2nd Division, VII Corps, February 1865. 1st Brigade, 1st Division, VII Corps, to June 1865.

The 13th Kansas Infantry mustered out at Fort Leavenworth, Kansas, on June 26, 1865, and was discharged on July 13, 1865.

== Detailed service ==
Action at Newtonia, Missouri, September 29, 1862. Occupation of Newtonia, October 4. March to Old Fort Wayne, arriving October 29. Cane Hill, November 28. Battle of Prairie Grove, Arkansas, December 7. Expedition over Boston Mountains to Van Buren, Arkansas, December 27–31. Capture of Van Buren, December 29. March to Springfield, Missouri, January 7, 1863, and duty there until May. March to Fort Scott, Kansas, May 19–29, thence to Drywood, and duty there until August. Blunt's Campaign, August 3–31. Capture of Fort Smith. To Webber Falls, Cherokee Nation, arriving August 31, and duty there until September 15. March to Scullyville, Cherokee Nation, and outpost and scout duty there until October 1. March to Van Buren, Arkansas, and duty there until February 1865. (Companies B, E, and F on garrison duty at Fort Smith, March 1864 to February 1865.) Companies A, C, D, G, H, and I were ordered to Little Rock, February 3, 1865, and performed provost and garrison duty there until June 1865.

== Casualties ==
The regiment lost a total of 129 men during service; 3 officers and 19 enlisted men killed or mortally wounded, 1 officer and 106 enlisted men died of disease.

== Commanders ==
- Colonel Thomas Mead Bowen

== See also ==
- List of Kansas Civil War Units
- Kansas in the Civil War
