= 11th Kansas Militia Infantry Regiment =

11th Kansas Infantry Regiment Militia
- Active: October 9 – 29, 1864
- Disbanded: October 29, 1864
- Allegiance: Union
- Branch: Infantry
- Type: Militia
- Size: Regiment
- Engagements: American Civil War: Price's Raid

The 11th Kansas Infantry Regiment was a militia infantry regiment from Kansas that served in the Union Army between October 9 and October 29, 1864, during the American Civil War.

== Service ==
The regiment was called into service on October 9, 1864, to defend Kansas from Maj. Gen. Sterling Price and his men. After pursuing Price, the regiment provided border protection between Coldwater Grove to Fort Scott. On October 29, 1864, it was disbanded.

== See also ==
- List of Kansas Civil War Units

== Bibliography ==
- Dyer, Frederick H. (1959). A Compendium of the War of the Rebellion. New York and London. Thomas Yoseloff, Publisher. LCCN 59-12963.
