= 1st Kansas Militia Infantry Regiment =

- Active: October 9 – 29, 1864
- Disbanded: October 29, 1864
- Allegiance: Union
- Branch: Infantry
- Type: Militia
- Size: Regiment
- Engagements: American Civil War: Price's Raid

The 1st Kansas Militia Infantry was an infantry regiment that served in the Union Army during the American Civil War.

== Service ==
The 1st Kansas Militia Infantry was called into service on October 9, 1864. It was disbanded on October 29, 1864.

== Detailed service ==
The unit was called into service to defend Kansas against Major General Sterling Price's raid.

== Commander ==
- Colonel Charles H. Robinson

== See also ==
- List of Kansas Civil War Units

== Bibliography ==
- Dyer, Frederick H. (1959). A Compendium of the War of the Rebellion. New York and London. Thomas Yoseloff, Publisher. LCCN 59-12963.
