= List of Kansas units in the American Civil War =

List of military units raised by the state of Kansas during the American Civil War (1861–1865).

== Artillery ==
- 1st Independent Battery Kansas Light Artillery
- 2nd Independent Battery Kansas Light Artillery
- 3rd Independent Battery Kansas Light Artillery

- Armstrong's Battery Kansas Light Artillery
- Opdyke's Battery Kansas Light Artillery
- Stover's Battery Kansas Light Artillery
- Hopkin's Battery Kansas Light Artillery

== Cavalry ==
- 2nd Kansas Cavalry Regiment
- 5th Kansas Cavalry Regiment
- 6th Kansas Cavalry Regiment
- 7th Kansas Cavalry Regiment - Jennison's Jayhawkers
- 9th Kansas Cavalry Regiment

- 11th Kansas Cavalry Regiment
- 13th Kansas Cavalry Regiment
- 14th Kansas Cavalry Regiment
- 15th Kansas Cavalry Regiment
- 16th Kansas Cavalry Regiment

== Infantry ==
- 1st Regiment Kansas Volunteer Infantry
- 1st Kansas Colored Volunteer Infantry Regiment (Colored)
- 2nd Regiment Kansas Volunteer Infantry
- 2nd Kansas Colored Volunteer Infantry Regiment (Colored)
- 3rd Regiment Kansas Volunteer Infantry
- 4th Regiment Kansas Volunteer Infantry
- 5th Regiment Kansas Volunteer Infantry

- 8th Regiment Kansas Volunteer Infantry
- 10th Regiment Kansas Volunteer Infantry
- 11th Regiment Kansas Volunteer Infantry
- 12th Regiment Kansas Volunteer Infantry
- 13th Regiment Kansas Volunteer Infantry
- 17th Regiment Kansas Volunteer Infantry

== Militia ==
- 1st Kansas Militia Infantry Regiment
- 2nd Kansas Militia Infantry Regiment
- 3rd Kansas Militia Infantry Regiment
- 4th Kansas Militia Infantry Regiment
- 5th Kansas Militia Infantry Regiment
- 6th Kansas Militia Infantry Regiment
- 7th Kansas Militia Infantry Regiment
- 8th Kansas Militia Infantry Regiment
- 9th Kansas Militia Infantry Regiment; mobilized October 9, 1864 – October 29, 1864 in response to Price's Missouri Expedition; commanded by Colonel Frank M. Tracy
- 10th Kansas Militia Infantry Regiment
- 11th Kansas Militia Infantry Regiment
- 12th Kansas Militia Infantry Regiment
- 13th Kansas Militia Infantry Regiment

- 14th Kansas Militia Infantry Regiment; October 9, 1864 – October 29, 1864; commanded by Colonel William Gordon
- 15th Kansas Militia Infantry Regiment
- 16th Kansas Militia Infantry Regiment
- 17th Kansas Militia Infantry Regiment
- 18th Kansas Militia Infantry Regiment
- 19th Kansas Militia Infantry Regiment
- 20th Kansas Militia Infantry Regiment
- 21st Kansas Militia Infantry Regiment
- 22nd Kansas Militia Infantry Regiment
- Leavenworth Militia (African Descent)
- Leavenworth State Guard
- Zesch's Militia Battery Kansas Light Artillery – Served at Fort Leavenworth during October 1864.

== See also ==
- Lists of American Civil War regiments by state
- United States Colored Troops
