= 10th Kansas Militia Infantry Regiment =

10th Kansas Infantry Regiment (Militia)
- Active: October 9 – 29, 1864
- Disbanded: October 29, 1864
- Allegiance: Union
- Branch: Infantry
- Type: Militia
- Size: Regiment
- Engagements: American Civil War: Price's Raid; Battle of Byram's Ford; Battle of Westport; Battle of Mine Creek; Battle of Marais des Cygnes; Second Battle of Newtonia

Commanders
- Colonel: William Pennock

The 10th Kansas Infantry Regiment was a militia infantry regiment from Kansas that served in the Union Army between October 9 and October 29, 1864, during the American Civil War.

== Service ==
The regiment was called into service on October 9, 1864, to defend Kansas from Maj. Gen. Sterling Price and his men. It saw action at Byram's Ford, Big Blue, Westport, Mine Creek, Little Osage River and Marias des Cygnes after pursuing Price. On October 29, 1864, it was disbanded.

== See also ==
- List of Kansas Civil War Units

== Bibliography ==
- Dyer, Frederick H. (1959). A Compendium of the War of the Rebellion. New York and London. Thomas Yoseloff, Publisher. LCCN 59-12963.
