= Department of Kansas =

- Active: 1861, 1862, 1864
- Country: United States of America
- Branch: United States Army
- Engagements: American Civil War

Commanders
- Notable commanders: David Hunter; James G. Blunt; Samuel R. Curtis

The Department of Kansas was a Union Army command department in the Trans-Mississippi Theater during the American Civil War. This department existed in three different forms during the war.

== 1861 ==
The first "Department of Kansas" was created on November 9, 1861 from the Western Department. It included Kansas, Nebraska Territory, Colorado Territory, Dakota Territory and the Indian Territory (present day Oklahoma). On March 11, 1862 the department was absorbed into the Department of the Mississippi. Brigadier General David Hunter was the sole commander during this period. During this interlude a District of Kansas existed under the command of Brigadier General James W. Denver from March 19-April 10, 1862.

== 1862 ==
Two months later the Department of Kansas was reformed out of the Dept. of Mississippi on May 2, 1862. This form of the department included all previous territories except Fort Garland, Colorado. Brigadier General James G. Blunt was appointed commander. On August 16, Blunt created the Army of Kansas which was virtually synonymous with the department. Nebraska and Dakota Territories were detached and transferred to the Department of the Northwest and shortly after on October 11 the Department of Kansas was absorbed into the Department of the Missouri.

The structure of the department during 1862 was as follows;

- Fort Kearny, Captain J A Thompson
  - Detachments from; 4th Cavalry Regiment, 6th Cavalry Regiment, and 8th Kansas Volunteer Infantry Regiment
- Fort Riley, Brigadier General R B Mitchell
  - 2nd Kansas Volunteer Cavalry Regiment
  - 7th Kansas Volunteer Cavalry Regiment
  - 1st Kansas Volunteer Infantry Regiment
  - 12th Wisconsin Volunteer Infantry Regiment
  - 13th Wisconsin Volunteer Infantry Regiment
  - Kansas Volunteer Artillery Battery
  - 8th Wisconsin Volunteer Artillery Battery
- Fort Laramie, Colonel E B Alexander
  - Detachments from; 2nd Cavalry Regiment and 10th Infantry Regiment
- Fort Larned, Colonel J Hayden
  - Company from the 2nd Infantry Regiment
- Fort Leavenworth, Major W E Prince
  - Detachments from the 1st Infantry Regiment and 8th Kansas Volunteer Infantry Regiment
  - Two batteries of artillery
- Leavenworth, Kansas, Colonel R H Graham
  - 5 Companies from the 8th Kansas Volunteer Infantry Regiment
- Fort Scott, Colonel F Salomon
  - 2nd Ohio Volunteer Cavalry Regiment
  - 10th Kansas Volunteer Infantry Regiment
  - 9th Wisconsin Volunteer Infantry Regiment
  - 2nd Indiana Artillery Battery
- Fort Wise, Lieutenant J M Warner
  - One Company from the 10th Infantry Regiment
- Fort Randall, Captain B Mahana
  - 3 Companies from the 14th Iowa Volunteer Infantry Regiment
- Ohio City, Kansas, Lieutenant Colonel C S Clark
  - 7 Companies from the 7th Kansas Volunteer Cavalry Regiment
- Paola, Kansas, Lieutenant Colonel W R Judson
  - 6th Kansas Volunteer Cavalry Regiment
- Springfield, Kansas, colonel P Clayton
  - 9 Companies from the 5th Kansas Volunteer Cavalry Regiment

== 1864 ==
On January 1, 1864 the third formation of the Department of Kansas was created. It included Kansas, Nebraska Territory, Colorado Territory (except Fort Garland), Indian Territory, and Fort Smith, Arkansas. Major General Samuel R. Curtis was appointed command. Fort Smith and the Indian Territory were transferred to the Department of Arkansas in April. On October 13 Curtis organized the Army of the Border, composed of troops from his department to confront Price's Missouri Raid. For the first time of the war troops from the Department of Kansas were involved in a major campaign, turning back Price's Confederates at the Battle of Westport. The Army of the Border was disbanded on November 9. It was also during this time that Colonel John M. Chivington, commander of the District of Colorado Territory, committed the Sand Creek massacre against the Cheyenne and Arapaho people on November 29, 1864. Shortly after Department of Kansas was merged into the Dept. of Missouri once again.

== See also ==
Army of the Border

== Sources ==
- Eicher, John H., & Eicher, David J., Civil War High Commands, Stanford University Press, 2001, ISBN 0-8047-3641-3.
