= 5th Kansas Militia Infantry Regiment =

- Active: October 9 – October 29, 1864
- Disbanded: October 29, 1864
- Allegiance: Union
- Branch: Infantry
- Type: Militia
- Size: Regiment
- Engagements: American Civil War: Price's Raid; Battle of Byram's Ford; Battle of Westport; Battle of Mine Creek; Battle of Marais des Cygnes; Second Battle of Newtonia

The 5th Kansas Militia Infantry was an infantry regiment that served in the Union Army during the American Civil War.

== Service ==
The 5th Kansas Militia Infantry was called into service on October 9, 1864. It was disbanded on October 29, 1864.

== Detailed service ==
The unit was called into service to defend Kansas against Maj. Gen. Sterling Price's raid. The regiment saw action at Byram's Ford, Big Blue, October 22. Westport October 23. Mine Creek, Little Osage River, Marias des Cygnes, October 25. Newtonia October 28.

== Commander ==
- Colonel Gustavus Adolphus Colton

== See also ==
- List of Kansas Civil War Units

== Bibliography ==
- Dyer, Frederick H. (1959). A Compendium of the War of the Rebellion. New York and London. Thomas Yoseloff, Publisher. LCCN 59-12963.
