= 2nd Independent Battery Kansas Light Artillery =

- Flag of the 2nd Independent Battery Kansas Light Artillery
- Active: September 10, 1862 – August 11, 1865
- Country: United States
- Allegiance: Union
- Branch: Artillery
- Equipment: 2 12-pdr iron Howitzers; 6 6-pdr iron Howitzers; 2 12-pdr M1857 "field guns"; 3 3" Parrott rifles
- Engagements: First Battle of Newtonia; Battle of Westport (1 section); Battle of Mine Creek (1 section)

2nd Independent Battery Kansas Light Artillery was an artillery battery that served in the Union Army during the American Civil War.

== Service ==
The battery was organized at Fort Scott, Kansas and mustered in September 10, 1862, for a three years under the command of Captain Charles White Blair.

The battery was attached to Department of Kansas to September 1862. 1st Brigade, Department of Kansas, to October 1862. 2nd Brigade, 1st Division, Army of the Frontier, Department of the Missouri (1 section), to February 1863. District of Southwest Missouri, Department of the Missouri, to June 1863. District of the Frontier, Department of the Missouri, to January 1864. Unattached, District of the Frontier, VII Corps, Department of Arkansas, to May 1864. 1st Brigade, District of the Frontier, VII Corps, to February 1865. 1st Brigade, 3rd Division, VII Corps, to July 1865.

The 2nd Kansas Battery mustered out of service on August 11, 1865.

== Detailed service ==
Duty at Fort Scott, Kansas, until June 1863. (1st Section moved to Greenfield, Missouri, September 1–3, 1862. Action at Newtonia September 30. Occupation of Newtonia October 4. Cane Hill November 28. 2nd Section moved from Fort Scott to Pea Ridge, Arkansas, October 12–19, 1862, returning to Fort Scott December 3–10, 1862.) Scout from Creek Agency to Jasper County, Missouri, May 16–19, 1863 (1 section). Sherwood May 19. (1 section moved to Baxter Springs May 6, returning to Fort Scott June 24.) Fort Gibson May 22. Near Fort Gibson May 28. Operations about Fort Gibson June 6–20. Greenleaf Prairie June 16. One section moved to Fort Gibson with supply train June 19-July 4. Action at Cabin Creek July 1–2 and 5. Battery moved to Fort Gibson July 5–12. Elk Creek near Honey Springs July 17. Duty at Fort Gibson until August 22. Near Sherwood August 14. Campaign to Perryville, Cherokee Nation, August 22–31. At Fort Gibson until November. Ordered to Fort Smith, Arkansas, arriving November 15, and duty there until July 1865. Near Fort Smith July 31, 1864. (One section at Clarksville June and July 1864. One section remained at Fort Scott and participated in the pursuit of Price.) Battle of Westport October 23, and pursuit beyond Fort Scott. Joined battery at Fort Smith June 1865. Action at Dardanelle, Arkansas, January 14, 1865.

== Commanders ==
- Captain Charles White Blair - promoted to major and transferred to 2nd Kansas Cavalry
- Captain Edward A. Smith
- 1st Lieutenant Daniel C. Knowles - commanded one section at the battles of Westport and Mine Creek

== See also ==
- List of Kansas Civil War Units
- Kansas in the Civil War
