= Battle of Marais des Cygnes =

Battle of the American Civil War

Coordinates: 38.2552°N 94.6783°W

- Part of the American Civil War
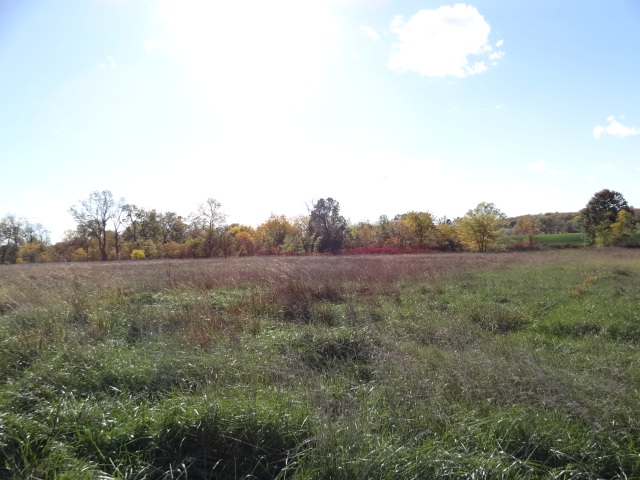
- Marais des Cygnes National Wildlife Refuge, which contains part of the battlefield
| Date | October 25, 1864; 162 years ago |
| Location | Linn County, Kansas |
| Result | Union victory |

Belligerents
| United States (Union) | Confederate States |

Commanders and leaders
| (United States) Alfred Pleasonton; (United States) John B. Sanborn | (Confederate States of America) John S. Marmaduke; (Confederate States of America) John B. Clark Jr. |

Units involved
| (United States) division | (Confederate States of America) Army of Missouri |

Strength
| 3,500 | Over 2,000 |

Casualties and losses
| Unknown | At least 100 |

The Battle of Marais des Cygnes (/ˌmɛər də ˈziːn, - ˈsiːn, ˈmɛər də ziːn/) took place on October 25, 1864, in Linn County, Kansas, during Price's Missouri Campaign during the American Civil War. It is also known as the Battle of Trading Post. In late 1864, Confederate Major-General Sterling Price invaded the state of Missouri with a cavalry force, attempting to draw Union troops away from the primary theaters of fighting further east. After several victories early in the campaign, Price's Confederate troops were defeated at the Battle of Westport on October 23 near Kansas City, Missouri. The Confederates then withdrew into Kansas, camping along the banks of the Marais des Cygnes River on the night of October 24. Union cavalry pursuers under Brigadier General John B. Sanborn skirmished with Price's rearguard that night, but disengaged without participating in heavy combat.

Overnight, Sanborn's troops were reinforced by cavalry under Lieutenant Colonel Frederick W. Benteen, bringing the total Union strength to 3,500. The battle began early the next morning as Sanborn drove Major General John S. Marmaduke's Confederate rearguard from its position north of the river. Union troops captured cannons, prisoners, and wagons during this stage of the fighting. Marmaduke attempted to make a stand at the river crossing, but his position was outflanked by a Union cavalry regiment, forcing him to abandon it. A rearguard action by Confederate Brigadier General John B. Clark Jr.'s 1,200-man brigade bought Price more time to retreat and disengage. Some of Price's men were still caught near Mine Creek later that morning and were badly beaten in the Battle of Mine Creek. That evening, the Battle of Marmiton River became the day's third action, after which Price burned his supply train so it no longer slowed the retreat. After another defeat at the Second Battle of Newtonia on October 28, Price's column retreated to Texas through Arkansas and the Indian Territory. Only 3,500 of the 12,000 men Price had brought into Missouri remained in his force.

== Background ==
When the American Civil War began in 1861, the state of Missouri was a slave state, but did not secede because the state was politically divided. Governor Claiborne Fox Jackson and the Missouri State Guard (MSG) supported secession and the Confederate States of America, while Brigadier General Nathaniel Lyon and the portion of the Union Army under his command supported the United States and opposed secession. Under Major General Sterling Price, the MSG defeated Union armies at the battles of Wilson's Creek and Lexington in 1861, but by the end of the year, Price and the MSG were restricted to the southwestern portion of the state due to the arrival of Union reinforcements. Meanwhile, Jackson and a portion of the state legislature voted to secede and join the Confederate States of America, while another element voted to reject secession, essentially giving the state two governments. In March 1862, a Confederate defeat at the Battle of Pea Ridge in Arkansas gave the Union control of Missouri. For the rest of the year, and through 1863, Confederate activity in the state was largely restricted to guerrilla warfare and raids.

By the beginning of September 1864, events in the eastern United States, especially the Confederate defeat in the Atlanta campaign, gave incumbent president Abraham Lincoln, who supported continuing the war, an edge in the 1864 United States presidential election over George B. McClellan, who promoted ending the war. At this point, the Confederacy had very little chance of winning the war. Meanwhile, in the Trans-Mississippi Theater, the Confederates had defeated Union attackers in the Red River campaign in Louisiana in March through May. As events east of the Mississippi River turned against the Confederates, General Edmund Kirby Smith, commander of the Confederate Trans-Mississippi Department, was ordered to transfer the infantry under his command to the fighting in the Eastern and Western Theaters. This proved to be impossible, as the Union Navy controlled the Mississippi River, preventing a large-scale crossing.

Despite having limited resources for an offensive, Smith decided that an attack designed to divert Union troops from the principal theaters of combat would have the same effect as the proposed transfer of troops. Price and the new Confederate Governor of Missouri Thomas Caute Reynolds (Note: Jackson had died in early December 1862 of cancer; Reynolds replaced him in office on February 14, 1863.) suggested that an invasion of Missouri would be an effective offensive; Smith approved the plan and appointed Price to command the campaign. Many of the Union troops previously defending Missouri had been transferred out of the state, leaving the Missouri State Militia as the state's primary defensive force. Price expected that the offensive would create a popular uprising against Union control of Missouri, divert Union troops away from principal theaters of combat, and aid McClellan's chance of defeating Lincoln. Price's column entered the state on September 19. This force was formally known as the Army of Missouri and contained three divisions, which were commanded by Major Generals James F. Fagan and John S. Marmaduke and Brigadier General Joseph O. Shelby. The Confederates had 13,000 cavalrymen and 14 small-bore cannons.

== Prelude ==
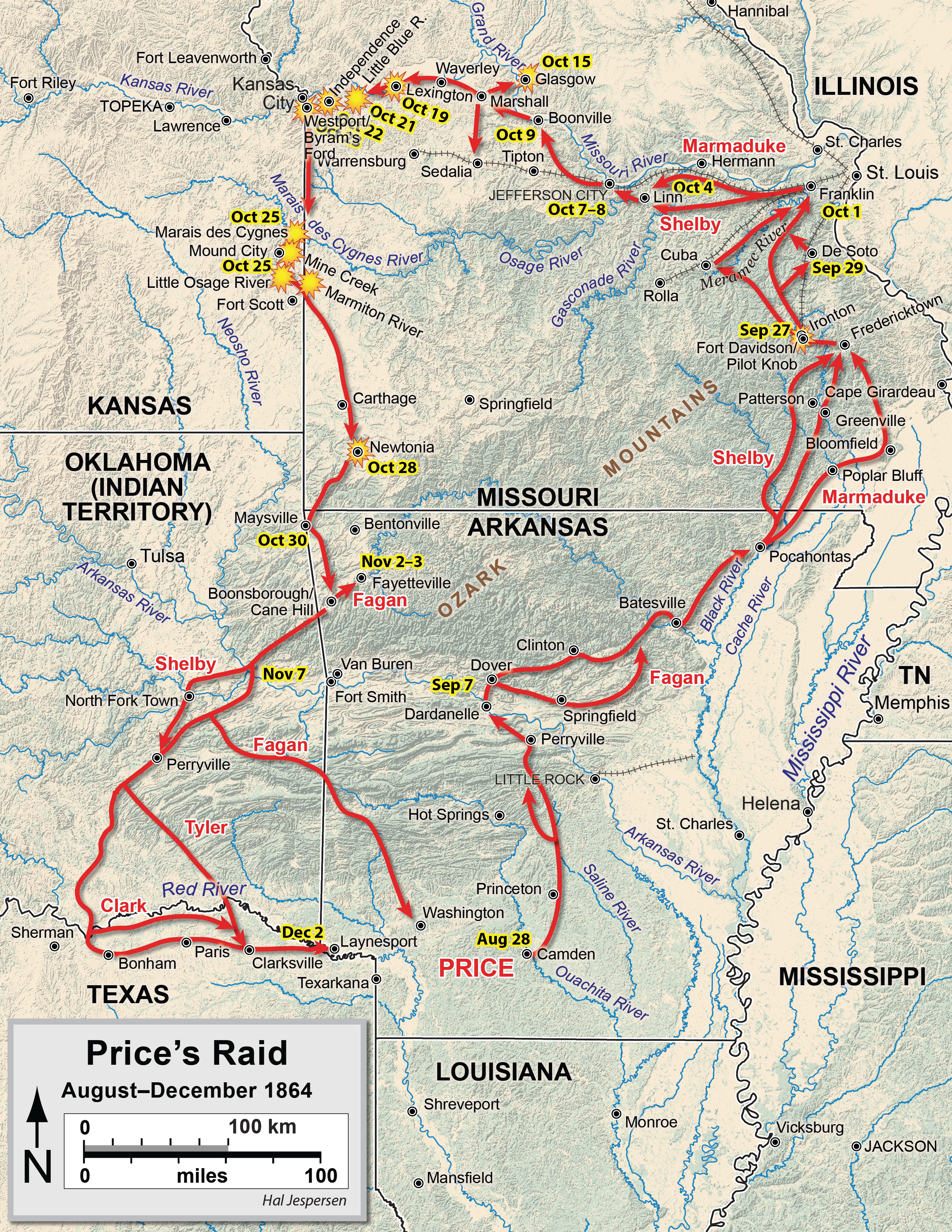
Map of Price's Raid

By September 24, Price's column had reached Fredericktown, where he learned that the town of Pilot Knob and the St. Louis & Iron Mountain Railroad were held by Union forces under the command of Brigadier General Thomas Ewing Jr. Price had no interest in allowing an enemy force to operate in the rear of his army while he advanced to St. Louis, so he sent Marmaduke and Fagan's divisions to Pilot Knob; Shelby and his men operated north of the town. On September 26, Ewing's command fought off Fagan's division at Arcadia before withdrawing to the defenses of Fort Davidson. The next day, Price moved against the fort and offered Ewing surrender terms; the latter refused, as he was afraid of being executed for his unpopular issuance of General Order No. 11 the previous year. (Note: General Order No. 11 had ordered the depopulation of several western Missouri counties, as well as allowing the burning of abandoned property.) Holding out, the Union defenders repulsed multiple assaults, before slipping out of the fort at 03:00 on September 28. The Confederates suffered at least 800 casualties during the engagement and their morale decreased, leading Price to abandon the attempt against St. Louis.

After abandoning the St. Louis thrust, Price's army headed for Jefferson City, although the Confederates were slowed by bringing along a large supply train. On October 7, the Confederates approached Jefferson City, which was held by about 7,000 men – mostly inexperienced militia – commanded by Brigadier General Egbert Brown. Faulty Confederate intelligence placed the Union strength at 15,000, and Price, fearing another defeat like Pilot Knob, decided not to attack the city, and began moving his army toward Boonville the next day. Boonville was in the pro-Confederate region of Little Dixie, and Price was able to recruit new soldiers. Estimates of the number of new recruits vary between writers: the historian Charles D. Collins states 1,200 men; Christopher Phillips, writing for the Kansas City Public Library, provides 2,000 men; and the historian Kyle Sinisi states that a minimum of 2,500 men joined the Confederates in the region. Price, needing weapons, authorized two raids away from his main body of troops: Brigadier General John B. Clark Jr. and 1,800 men were sent to Glasgow, and Brigadier General (Note: Thompson's commission was in the Missouri State Guard, not the Confederate States Army.) M. Jeff Thompson led Shelby's Iron Brigade to Sedalia. Both raids were successful. Price's army next fought a series of engagements as it moved westwards towards Kansas City, Missouri, culminating in the Battle of Westport on October 23. At Westport, the Confederates were soundly defeated by the commands of Major Generals James G. Blunt and Alfred Pleasonton. Shelby's men provided the Confederates with a rearguard, and the Army of Missouri retreated southwards.

The Confederates still had a large supply train with them, slowing the retreat. By the evening of October 24, the Army of Missouri had entered Kansas; Confederate soldiers looted and burned as they went. That night, Price camped near Trading Post in Linn County, with the camp split into two segments by the Marais des Cygnes River. Price believed that the Union pursuers would attempt to swing around his flank and block his path of retreat and was not expecting a significant Union force to attack the Trading Post position. Meanwhile, the Union pursuers were at West Point, Missouri. Blunt suggested an ambitious flanking movement, but was overruled by Major General Samuel R. Curtis, commander of the Department of Kansas. The plan would have involved only using a token force to attack the Confederate position at the Marais des Cygnes and slipping most of the rest of the Union army around the Confederate flank to attack Price's army in the morning. Both the flanking movement and crossing a river at night posed risks, and Blunt's plan did not consider the fact that the terrain south of the Marais des Cygnes was not conducive to rapid movement. It also assumed that the Confederates would remain stationary. Instead, Curtis ordered Pleasonton to make a frontal attack against Price. Pleasonton, who was heavily fatigued, gave temporary control of his division to Brigadier General John B. Sanborn.

Sanborn moved against Price with a cavalry force at Trading Post late on the night of the 24th. His line, which consisted of the 4th Iowa Cavalry Regiment and three companies of the 2nd Colorado Cavalry Regiment on the right and the 6th and 8th Missouri State Militia Cavalry Regiments on the left, made contact with Fagan's Confederates, who were now serving as the Confederate rearguard. A brief friendly fire incident involving the 4th Iowa Cavalry and the 2nd Colorado Cavalry ensued due to the Iowans being unaware of the presence of the Colorado unit in their front, as well as some light skirmishing with Fagan's forces. Sanborn was unsure of the Confederates' strength, but thought it might be as many as 10,000 men. With his men fatigued and operating in a thunderstorm, he withdrew most of his line, except for the 6th Missouri State Militia Cavalry, which continued skirmishing throughout the night. Fagan informed Price of the action, and the Confederates began retreating about midnight.

== Battle ==
At around 01:00 the next morning, Curtis was informed that Sanborn had disengaged. Wishing to continue to press Price, he ordered Sanborn to attack at daybreak. Curtis had some of his staff officers assist Sanborn, who had been at least partially stymied by lack of staff assistance. An artillery battery was deployed at this time. Around 02:00, Fagan and Shelby withdrew their troops, and Marmaduke aligned his division to serve as a rearguard; it was over 2,000-strong. Marmaduke withdrew his main force south of the river, but left a skirmish line on a pair of mounds that were 140 feet (43 m) tall. During the night, part of the 2nd Colorado Cavalry broke through the Confederate skirmish line before withdrawing again. A Missouri State Militia unit and the 4th Iowa Cavalry also advanced under cover of darkness. During the night, Sanborn was reinforced by elements of Lieutenant Colonel Frederick W. Benteen's cavalry brigade. One of Benteen's regiments was detached to guard a river crossing to the north to prevent a Confederate flanking attack. At 04:00, Sanborn's artillery, six 3-inch ordnance rifles, opened fire on the Confederate line.

At daybreak, the 4th Iowa Cavalry on the Union right attacked, using the broken ground as cover. Union artillery fired on the mounds, but despite aiming at a 15° elevation, overshot the elevated Confederate positions. Some of the misses struck the Confederate camp, accelerating its evacuation. Confederate marksmanship at that portion of the line was very poor, and the Iowans easily took the position, which consisted of one of the mounds. The 6th and 8th Missouri State Militia Cavalry Regiments attacked on the other end of the line. Again, the fire from the Confederate defenders was ineffective. Both sides were hampered by the rough terrain. The Confederate commander facing the two militia cavalry regiments feared being isolated from Marmaduke's main body on the other side of the river, so the mound was abandoned. The retreat was not detected until after the position had been completely abandoned. The historian Kyle Sinisi wrote that casualties during this stage of the fighting "appear to have been almost nonexistent". With Confederate resistance north of the river broken, Sanborn deployed the 3rd Iowa Cavalry Regiment and the 10th Missouri Cavalry Regiment, as well as the 2nd Arkansas Cavalry Regiment, to exploit the breakthrough.

The 2nd Arkansas Cavalry spearheaded the pursuit. Union forces captured 100 Confederate soldiers, as well as two cannons and some wagons, north of the river, including around the Trading Post settlement. Large quantities of equipment, personal effects, and partially cooked food were found left in the camp, including the partially butchered carcasses of livestock. Marmaduke had positioned men and three cannons from Hynson's Texas Battery just south of the river crossing, and these Union troops were temporarily halted, as there were not enough Union soldiers on the field to challenge the Confederate line directly. The river crossing was obstructed with two downed trees and some men from Colonel Thomas R. Freeman's command. Sanborn ordered the 7th Provisional Enrolled Missouri Militia to cross the river upstream from the Confederate position, successfully outflanking the Confederate line and opening a path across the river. As the 7th Provisional Enrolled Missouri Militia cleared the approach from the flank, the 2nd Arkansas also drove across the river. A tributary of the Marais des Cygnes, named Big Sugar Creek, presented another challenge to the crossing. An alternate crossing of the Marais des Cygnes bypassed this roadblock, but Sanborn was not aware of its existence.

Serving as a rearguard, Clark aligned his brigade in the path of the Union advance. This line was spotted by Sanborn's men after they forced their way through some forest growth around the river. Sanborn drew up a line with two Provisional Enrolled Missouri Militia units thrown out as skirmishers, and the 2nd Arkansas Cavalry, 2nd Colorado Cavalry, and two additional militia units forming his main line. Confused as to what to do, Sanborn left to personally find Curtis for orders and left Colonel John E. Phelps, commander of the 2nd Arkansas Cavalry, in charge in his absence. Phelps's orders were not to attack unless reinforced, but he assaulted Clark's line with 200 men from his own unit and the two Missouri State Militia commands anyway. The attack was initially successful, but halted and was repulsed. Curtis and Pleasonton had joined Sanborn by this point, and observed the 2nd Arkansas' repulse. They attempted to bring more troops to Phelps' support, but Price's wagons had cut up the roads during their retreat, making maneuvers difficult.

By 09:00, Pleasonton, who had regained command of his division from Sanborn, formed a line with the cavalry brigades commanded by Sanborn, Benteen, and Colonel John F. Philips. A small unit of Union artillery also joined the line. Sanborn's command outflanked the right of Clark's line and forced the Confederates to withdraw; another Confederate cannon was captured when Hynson's battery abandoned it during the retreat. Clark's brigade formed a new line containing around 1,200 men, but the weight of the 3,500 Union troopers now present was too much for the Confederates. After Philips's troops threatened his left, Clark ordered a retreat from the field around 10:00. Colonel Colton Greene and his 3rd Missouri Cavalry Regiment provided a rearguard for the Confederates.

== Aftermath ==
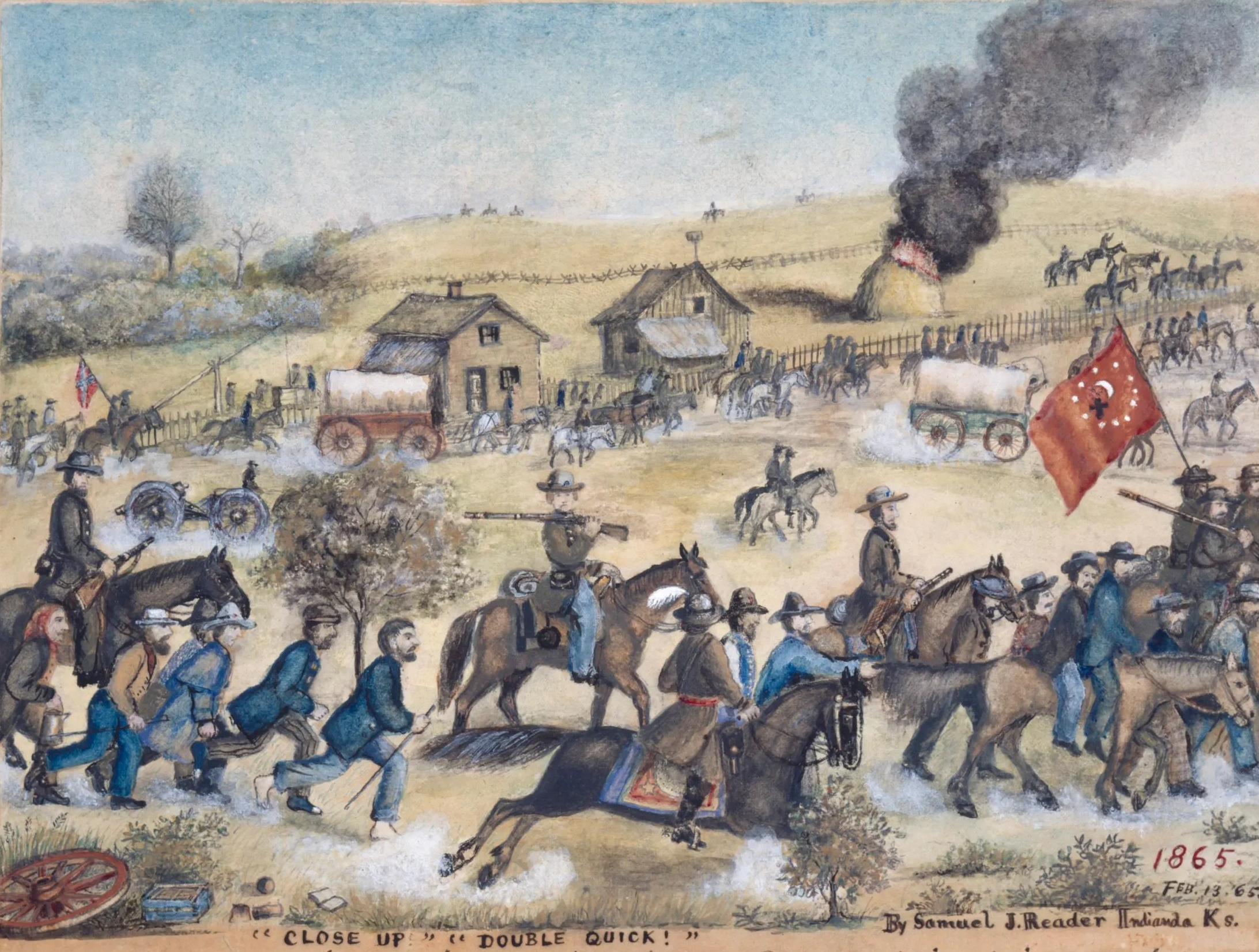
Confederate cavalrymen escorting POWs to the rear during Price's raid.

Later that morning, Philips and Benteen's troops encountered some of Price's men at the crossing of Mine Creek. The Union troops quickly attacked, and the ensuing Battle of Mine Creek became one of the largest battles between mounted cavalry during the war. The Confederates suffered a serious defeat, as several cannons and about 600 men, including Marmaduke, were captured. Shelby's division served as a rearguard, fighting the Battle of Marmiton River that evening. By the end of October 25, Price's army was so shattered and demoralized that the historian Albert E. Castel described it as essentially an armed mob. That night, Price burned most of his wagon train near Deerfield, Missouri so that it was no longer an encumbrance. By October 28, the Confederates had reached Newtonia, Missouri, where they were defeated by the commands of Blunt and Sanborn in the Second Battle of Newtonia. Price's army began to disintegrate, and the Confederates retreated first into Arkansas and then into the Indian Territory and Texas. Price's Raid, the last major offensive in the Trans-Mississippi Theater, was a failure. By December, Price only had 3,500 men left in an army that had begun the campaign with 12,000.

== Legacy ==
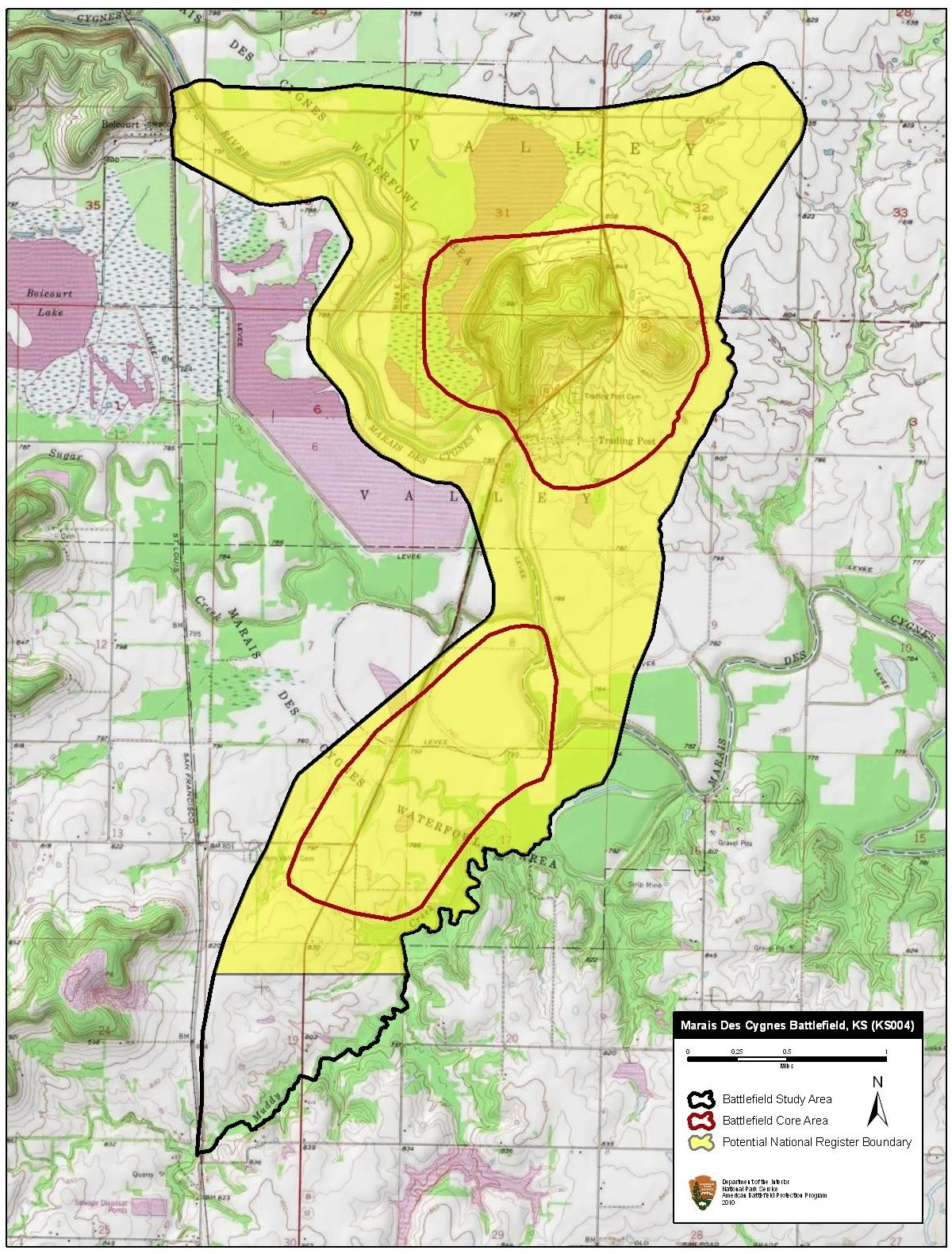
The Marais des Cygnes Battlefield

Over 937 acres (379 ha) of the battlefield are preserved by government agencies: 150 acres (61 ha) by the Kansas Department of Fish and Wildlife, and 787.25 acres (318.59 ha) by the United States Fish and Wildlife Service; the land under the control of the latter agency is within Marais des Cygnes National Wildlife Refuge. As of 2010, 92 percent of the battlefield retains historical integrity; of this, only 19 percent is included in the wildlife refuge. Since the land is preserved as a wildlife site instead of a historic site, the only public interpretation of the battle is some signage and trails present at a rest stop maintained by the Kansas Department of Transportation. U.S. Route 69 and Kansas State Highway 52 run through the northern portion of the battlefield, although the landscape is generally free from major development. As of January 2021, the site of the battle is not listed on the National Register of Historic Places, although a 2010 survey performed by the American Battlefield Protection Program determined that it is likely eligible for listing.

== See also ==
- List of battles fought in Kansas
- Kansas in the American Civil War

== Sources ==
- Buresh, Lumir F. (1977). October 25 and the Battle of Mine Creek. Kansas City, Missouri: The Lowell Press. ISBN 0-913504-40-8.
- Castel, Albert (1993) [1968]. General Sterling Price and the Civil War in the West (paperback ed.). Baton Rouge, Louisiana: Louisiana State University Press. ISBN 0-8071-1854-0.
- Collins, Charles D. Jr. (2016). Battlefield Atlas of Price's Missouri Expedition of 1864 (PDF). Fort Leavenworth, Kansas: Combat Studies Institute Press. ISBN 978-1-940804-27-9.
- Jenkins, Paul Burrill (1906). The Battle of Westport (PDF). Kansas City, Missouri: Franklin Hudson Publishing Company. OCLC 711047091.
- Kennedy, Frances H., ed. (1998). The Civil War Battlefield Guide (2nd ed.). Boston/New York: Houghton Mifflin. ISBN 978-0-395-74012-5.
- Lause, Mark A. (2016). The Collapse of Price's Raid: The Beginning of the End in Civil War Missouri. Columbia, Missouri: University of Missouri Press. ISBN 978-0-8262-2025-7.
- NPS Project Team (November 2010). "Update to the Civil War Sites Advisory Commission Report on the Nation's Civil War Battlefields: State of Kansas" (PDF). Washington, D. C.: National Park Service – American Battlefield Protection Program.
- Parrish, William Earl (2001) [1973]. A History of Missouri: 1860–1875. Columbia, Missouri: University of Missouri Press. ISBN 0-8262-1376-6.
- Scott, William F. (1893). The Story of a Cavalry Regiment: The Career of the Fourth Iowa Veteran Volunteers from Kansas to Georgia, 1861–1865. New York: G. P. Putnam's Sons. OCLC 936067358.
- Sinisi, Kyle S. (2020) [2015]. The Last Hurrah: Sterling Price's Missouri Expedition of 1864 (paperback ed.). Lanham, Maryland: Rowman & Littlefield. ISBN 978-1-5381-4151-9.
- Stalnaker, Jeffrey D. (2011). Bostick, Doug (ed.). The Battle of Mine Creek: The Crushing End of the Missouri Campaign. Charleston, South Carolina: The History Press. ISBN 978-1-60949-332-5.
- Warner, Ezra J. (1987) [1959]. Generals in Gray (paperback ed.). Baton Rouge, Louisiana: Louisiana State University Press. ISBN 978-0-8071-3150-3.
