= 2nd Kansas Cavalry Regiment =

- Regimental flag of the 2nd Kansas Cavalry
- Active: November 8, 1861 – August 16, 1865
- Disbanded: August 17, 1865
- Country: United States
- Allegiance: Union
- Branch: Cavalry
- Equipment: "Hall's carbines Starr Carbine, .54 cal., Austrian carbines French revolvers"
- Engagements: Battle of Perryville (detachment); Battle of Old Fort Wayne; Battle of Prairie Grove; Battle of Devil's Backbone; Camden Expedition

The 2nd Kansas Cavalry Regiment was a cavalry regiment that served in the Union Army during the American Civil War.

== Service ==
The 2nd Kansas Cavalry was organized at Kansas City, Kansas beginning on November 8, 1861, but its designation was changed to 9th Kansas Infantry on February 4, 1862. It was changed again on March 5, 1862, to 2nd Kansas Cavalry. It was mustered in under the command of Colonel Alson C. Davis.

The regiment was attached to Department of Kansas November 1861 to August 1862. 2nd Brigade, Department of Kansas, to October 1862. 2nd Brigade, 1st Division, Army of the Frontier, Department of Missouri, to February 1863. District of Southwest Missouri, Department of Missouri, to December 1863. 2nd Brigade, District of the Frontier, to January 1864. 2nd Brigade, District of the Frontier, VII Corps, Department of Arkansas, to March 1864. 1st Brigade, District of the Frontier, VII Corps, to April 1864. 3rd Brigade, District of the Frontier, VII Corps, to January 1865. 2nd Brigade, 3rd Division, VII Corps, to February 1865. Unattached, VII Corps, to August 1865.

On May 22, 1862, an order was received from District Headquarters for the 2nd Kansas Cavalry to provide a 150-man detail to man a battery of six 10-pdr Parrott rifles at Fort Leavenworth. This battery became known as Hopkins' Battery and remained in service until August 1, 1862. Some officers were ordered to return to the regiment, while the remaining men were mounted and ordered to reinforce Major General Don Carlos Buell in northern Alabama. This detachment ultimately participated in the Kentucky Campaign, saw minor action at the Battle of Perryville and captured a rebel flag and 24 prisoners at Lancaster, Kentucky, in a skirmish there. These men returned to the regiment by January 1, 1863.

The 2nd Kansas Cavalry mustered out of service on August 17, 1865.

== Casualties ==
The regiment lost a total of 181 men during service; 2 officers and 62 enlisted men killed or mortally wounded, 1 officer and 116 enlisted men died of disease.

== Commanders ==
- Colonel Alson C. Davis
- Colonel Robert Byington Mitchell
- Colonel Samuel Johnson Crawford
- Lieutenant Colonel Owen A. Bassett

== Notable members ==
- Colonel William F. Cloud - Namesake of Cloud County, Kansas.
- Captain Avra P. Russell, Company K - Namesake of Russell County, Kansas, died of wounds received at the Battle of Prairie Grove, Arkansas.
- Sergeant Marion Harper, Company E - Namesake of Harper County, Kansas, killed at Waldron, Arkansas
- Private William D. Mitchell, Company K - Namesake of Mitchell County, Kansas, promoted to captain of a Kentucky regiment, killed at the Battle of Monroe's Crossroads, North Carolina
- Private Vincent B. Osborn, Company A - Namesake of Osborne County, Kansas, lost a leg at Roseville, Logan County, Arkansas
- Thomas Martin, Private, 2nd Kansas Cavalry, Company C, Saline County Kansas, Salina, KS, prominent farmer and Kansas pioneer and Irish immigrant. Severely wounded in the arm at the Battle of Prairie Grove AR, Reed Mountain. His brother was in the Union Army and died during the Civil War, Ohio 43rd, Infantry.
- Elias S. Stover, Artillery Officer, promoted to Captain in 1863. Served in the Kansas House of Representatives & Senate. Elected seventh Lieutenant Governor of Kansas. Served as County Commissioner of Bernalillo County, New Mexico and as a member of the Constitutional Convention in 1889. He served in the Territorial Legislature in 1891. From 1891 to 1897 he served as the first president of the University of New Mexico. Stover Avenue in Albuquerque is named after him.

== See also ==
- List of Kansas Civil War Units
- Kansas in the Civil War
