= James G. Blunt =

19th-century American physician, abolitionist, and Union general (1826–1881)

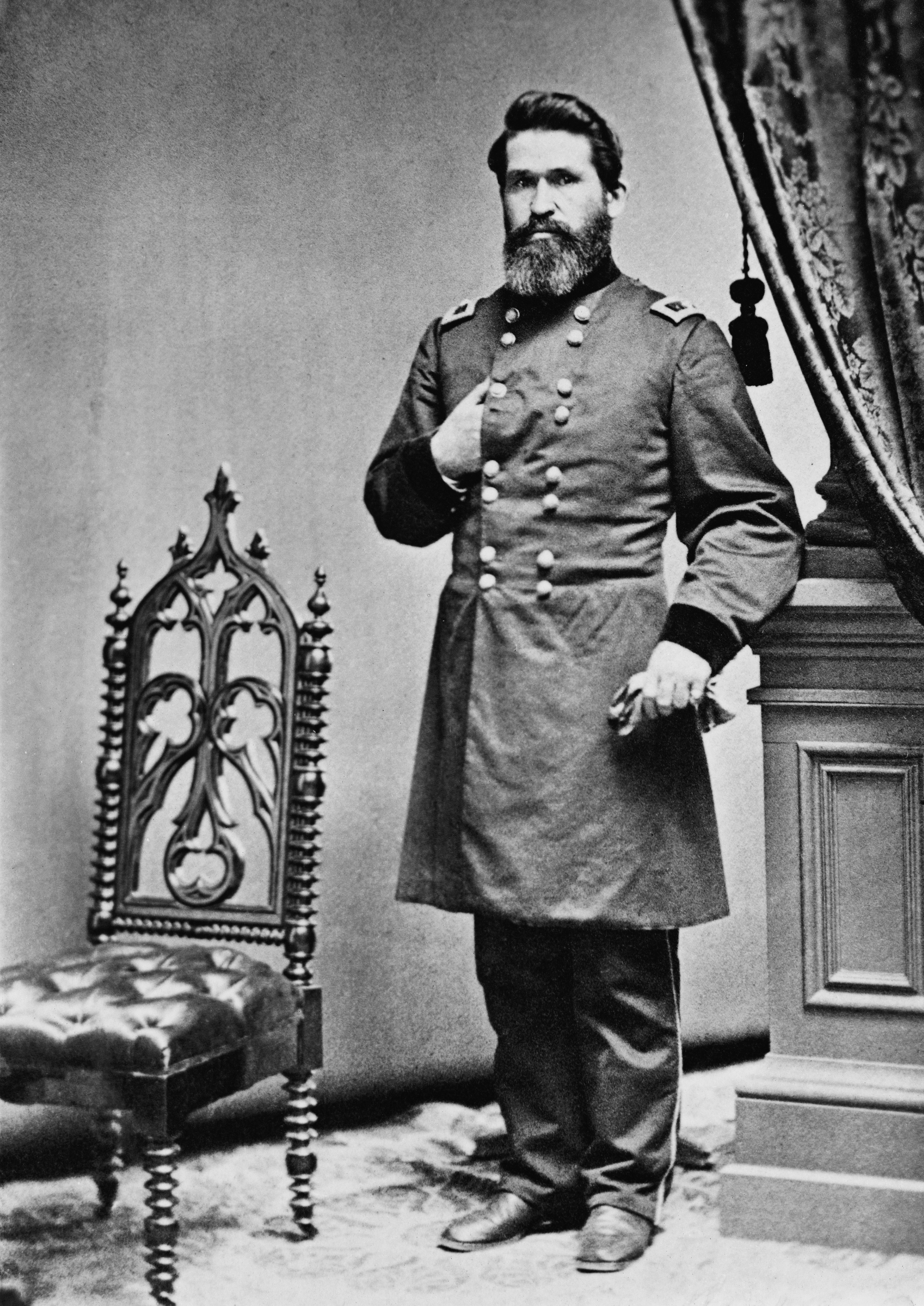
- Brig. Gen. James G. Blunt ca. 1862
- Born: July 21, 1826; Trenton, Maine
- Died: July 27, 1881 (aged 55); Washington, D.C.
- Burial place: Mount Muncie Cemetery, Leavenworth, Kansas
- Military career
- Allegiance: United States of America; Union
- Branch: United States Army; Union Army
- Service years: 1861–1865
- Rank: Major General
- Commands: Army of Kansas; Army of the Frontier; District of the Frontier
- Conflicts: American Civil War; First Battle of Newtonia; Battle of Old Fort Wayne; Battle of Cane Hill; Battle of Prairie Grove; Battle of Honey Springs; Battle of Westport; Second Battle of Newtonia
- Other work: physician, attorney

James G. (Note: The G. is short for Gillpatrick or Gilpatrick. James uses the two "l"'s spelling in his writing, while historians sometimes use the single "l" spelling.) Blunt (July 21, 1826 – July 27, 1881) was an American medical doctor and abolitionist who rose to the rank of major general in the Union Army during the American Civil War. He was defeated by Quantrill's Raiders at the Battle of Baxter Springs in Kansas in 1863, but is considered to have served well the next year as a division commander during Price's Raid in Missouri.

== Early life and career ==
Blunt was born in Trenton, Maine to John Blunt and Sally Gilpatrick Blunt. Blunt lived and worked on his family farm until he was 14. He may have spent some time at the Ellsworth Military Academy in Ellsworth, Maine. He became a sailor on a merchant vessel when he was 15, and attained the rank of captain at 20.

In 1845 Blunt moved to Columbus, Ohio, where he enrolled in Starling Medical College. His maternal uncle, Dr. Rufus Gilpatrick, was one of the instructors. Graduating in February 1849, Blunt moved to New Madison, Ohio and started a practice. On January 15, 1850, he married Nancy G. Putman. Blunt practiced medicine and took an active role in county politics as a member of the Republican Party.

== Kansas career ==
In 1856 Blunt and his family relocated to Anderson County, Kansas, following his uncle who had moved there several years earlier. He soon became involved in the conflict before the Civil War known as Bleeding Kansas, when abolitionist and slavery forces battled to control the territory. During a confrontation with the pro-slavery territorial government in 1857, Blunt joined a force including Jim Lane and abolitionist John Brown. Blunt was a key member of the Wyandotte constitutional convention that framed the Kansas state constitution in 1859, and served as chair of the committee on militia.

== Civil War ==
At the outbreak of the Civil War in 1861, Blunt was appointed lieutenant colonel of the 3rd Regiment Kansas Volunteer Infantry, a part of James Lane's Kansas Brigade, an irregular partisan force not accepted into the Union Army until reorganized in April 1862. He ordered Colonel William Weer to lead the "Indian Expedition" in 1861 which succeeded in occupying Fort Gibson and arming three regiments of Native Americans. In September 1861, he led a group of troops in killing Captain John Allen Mathews and his men. In April 1862, Blunt was appointed brigadier general of volunteers and given command of the Department and Army of Kansas. Blunt's forces were defeated in the First Battle of Newtonia, and the Army of Kansas was incorporated into the Army of the Frontier as the 1st Division. Blunt led his division of Cherokee and Kansas volunteers to victory at the Battle of Old Fort Wayne. In December 1862, Blunt's division was joined by the 2nd Division under Francis J. Herron. The combined forces met Confederates under Thomas C. Hindman at the Battle of Prairie Grove. While tactically a draw, the battle was a strategic victory for the Union.

Blunt was appointed major general of volunteers on March 16, 1863. He was the only officer from Kansas to achieve that rank during the war. He established Fort Baxter (also known as Fort Blair) in May 1863 near Baxter Springs, Kansas.

Blunt was appointed to command the District of the Frontier. He campaigned for control of the Indian Territory and won a victory at the Battle of Honey Springs, bringing much of the Indian Territory into Union control. The 1st Kansas Colored Infantry's attack at Honey Springs was the first victory of a regiment sized unit of black troops against Confederate troops during the Civil War. In October 1863, while moving his headquarters from Fort Scott to Fort Smith, Blunt and his detachment were attacked by a Confederate force under William C. Quantrill. At the Battle of Baxter Springs Quantrill's Raiders routed and killed over 80 of Blunt's 100 escorts, including his adjutant Major Henry Curtis, son of Major General Samuel Curtis. These actions led to Blunt's removal from command of the District of the Frontier.

In 1864, Blunt was able to redeem himself. Confederate Maj. Gen. Sterling Price began an invasion of Missouri and Blunt took command of the 1st Division of Army of the Border. He and the cavalry under Alfred Pleasonton fought delaying actions until Samuel R. Curtis brought the full strength of the army together and inflicted a defeat on Price at the Battle of Westport. Blunt's division inflicted the final defeat to Price at the Second Battle of Newtonia. Blunt commanded the District of South Kansas when the war ended.

== Post-war life and death ==
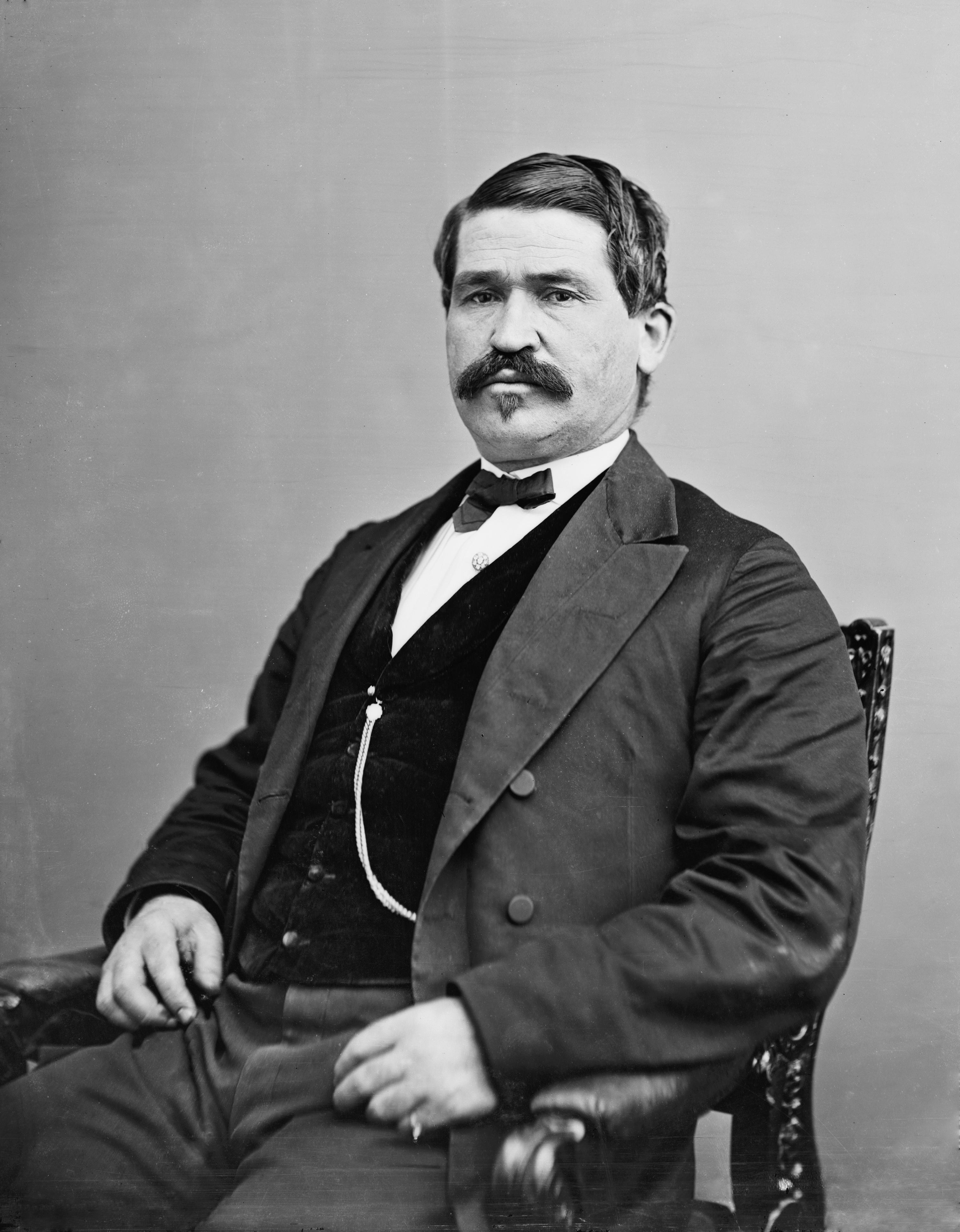
James G. Blunt in a post-war portrait

After the war, Blunt settled with his family in Leavenworth, Kansas and resumed his medical practice; he also was admitted to the Kansas bar as a lawyer. He moved to Washington, D.C. in 1869 where he practiced his new profession. His daughter Katherine Putnam married Houston lawyer and member of the War Industries Board, Edwin B. Parker.

In 1873, Blunt was accused by the Department of Justice of conspiracy to defraud the government and a body of Cherokee Indians in North Carolina. Earlier he had been cited in the 41st Congress's investigation of the Department of Indian Affairs, for charging Western tribes exorbitant (40% to 50%) lobbying fees for payments due them.

Blunt's behavior became erratic in 1879 when he was 53, and he was committed to an asylum. He died two years later, with the cause of death given as "softening of the brain." His body was returned to Leavenworth and is buried in the Mount Muncie Cemetery.

== In popular culture ==
James Blunt features briefly in Rifles for Watie, a novel by Harold Keith about a young Union soldier from Kansas fighting the Civil War in Indian Territory and the surrounding states. It includes a description of the Battle of Prairie Grove.

== Works cited ==
=== Books ===
- Collins, Robert (2005). General James G. Blunt: Tarnished Glory. Pelican Publishing.
- Eicher, John H.; Eicher, David J. (2001). Civil War High Commands. Stanford: Stanford University Press. ISBN 0804736413.
- Snyder, Michael (2017). John Joseph Mathews: Life of an Osage Writer. Norman: University of Oklahoma Press. ISBN 978-0-8061-5609-5.
- Warner, Ezra J. (1964). Generals in Blue: Lives of the Union Commanders (1st ed.). Baton Rouge: Louisiana State University Press. ISBN 978-0-8071-0822-2.
- Warner, Ezra J. (2002). Generals in Blue: Lives of the Union Commanders (Reprint ed.). Baton Rouge: Louisiana State University Press. ISBN 9780807108222.

=== Journal articles ===
- Blunt, James G.; Roberts, Tod (May 1932). "General Blunt's Account of His Civil War Experiences". Kansas Historical Quarterly. 1 (3): 211–265. Archived from the original on January 23, 2003.

== See also ==
- List of American Civil War generals (Union)

Military offices
Preceded by John Schofield	Commander of the Army of the Frontier; 1863	Succeeded by Francis Herron
