= Samuel Ryan Curtis =

American Union Army general (1805–1866)

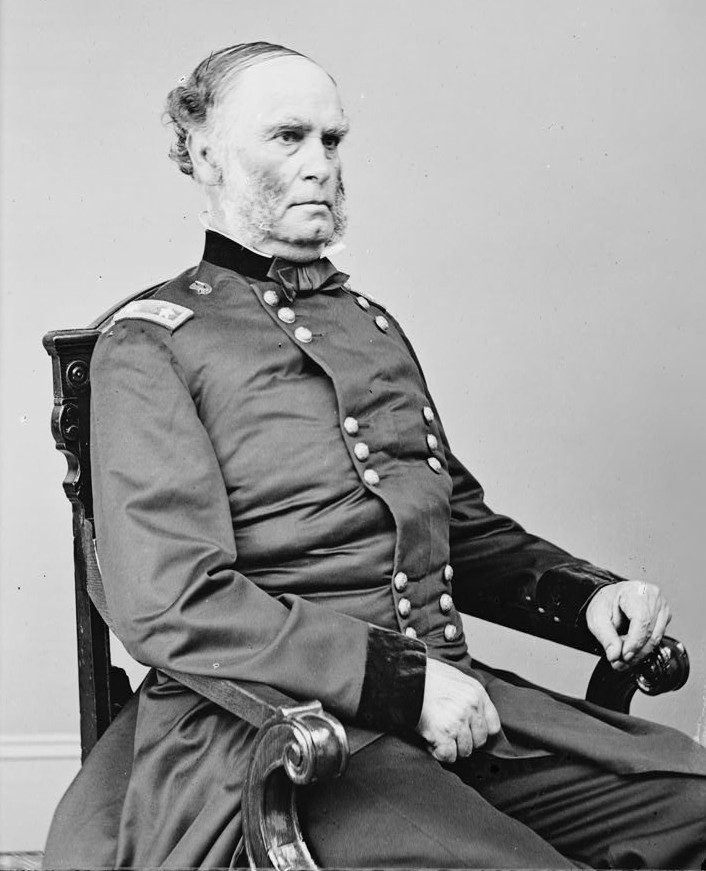
- Samuel R. Curtis in 1864

Member of the U.S. House of Representatives from Iowa's 1st district
- In office March 4, 1857 – August 4, 1861
- Preceded by: Augustus Hall
- Succeeded by: James F. Wilson

Personal details
- Born: February 3, 1805 Champlain, New York, U.S.
- Died: December 26, 1866 (aged 61) Council Bluffs, Iowa, U.S.
- Party: Republican
- Occupation: Politician, railroad commissioner

Military service
- Allegiance: United States; Union
- Branch/service: United States Army; Union Army
- Years of service: 1831–1832, 1846–1847, 1861–1865
- Rank: Major General
- Commands: 2nd Iowa Infantry; Army of the Southwest; Department of the Missouri; Army of the Border
- Battles/wars: Mexican–American War; American Civil War; Battle of Pea Ridge; Battle of Cotton Plant; Battle of Westport

Samuel Ryan Curtis (February 3, 1805 – December 26, 1866) was an American military officer and one of the first Republicans elected to Congress. He was most famous for his role as a Union Army general in the Trans-Mississippi Theater of the American Civil War, especially for his victories at the Battles of Pea Ridge in 1862 and Westport in 1864.

== Early life, Mexican–American War and politics ==
Born near Champlain, New York, Curtis graduated from the United States Military Academy in 1831. He was stationed at Fort Gibson in the Indian Territories (present-day Oklahoma) before resigning from the Army in 1832.

He moved to Ohio, where he worked as a civil engineer on the Muskingum River improvement projects and also became a lawyer in 1841. During the Mexican–American War, he was appointed colonel of the 3rd Regiment of Ohio Volunteers and served as military governor of several occupied cities. After the war in the 1850s, he served as chief engineer for river improvements in Des Moines, Iowa, for public infrastructure works in St. Louis, as well as for the American Central Railroad in Iowa. He became Mayor of Keokuk in 1856 and in the same year was elected as a Republican to represent Iowa's 1st congressional district in the United States House of Representatives. Curtis and Timothy Davis (elected the same day to represent Iowa's 2nd congressional district) were the first Iowa Republicans elected to serve in the U.S. House. Curtis was re-elected in 1858 and 1860; during his time in Congress, he was a strong advocate of a transcontinental railroad.

== Civil War service ==
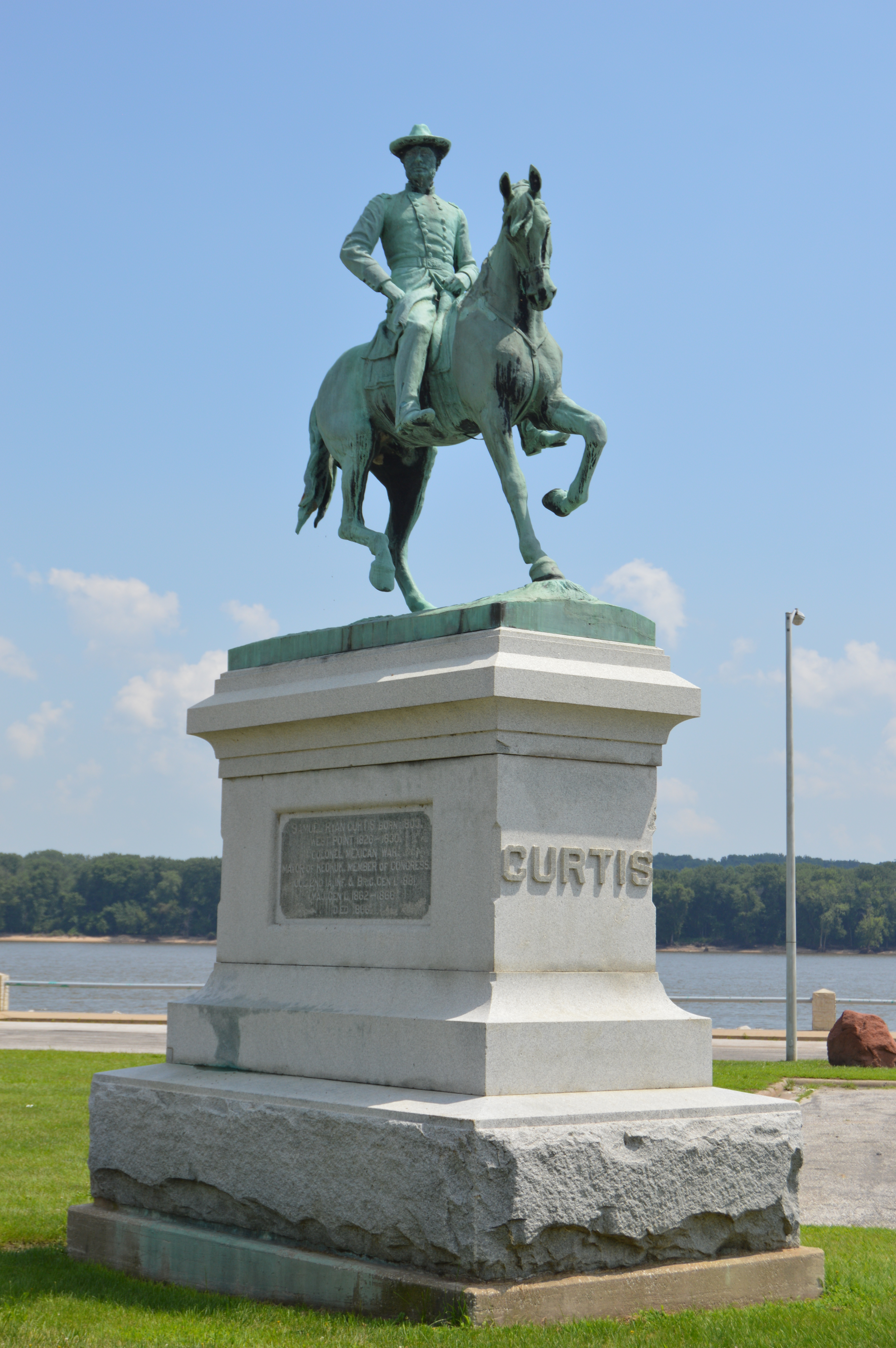
Equestrian statue on the Keokuk riverfront in Keokuk, Iowa

He was a supporter of Abraham Lincoln, and was considered for a cabinet position in the Lincoln administration. However, after the Civil War broke out, Curtis was appointed colonel of the 2nd Iowa Infantry on June 1, 1861, prompting him to resign his congressional seat on August 4 of that year. He was subsequently promoted to brigadier general, with the promotion backdated to May 17, 1861.

After organizing the chaos in St. Louis, Missouri, Curtis was given command of the Army of the Southwest on December 25, 1861, by Maj. Gen. Henry W. Halleck. The Army originally consisted of three divisions, the 1st commanded by Brig. Gen. Franz Sigel, the 2nd by Brig. Gen. Alexander Asboth, and the 3rd by Col. Jefferson C. Davis. However, Sigel, a native German who held significant influence amongst the many German immigrants in the army, threatened to resign over having not been appointed to command of the army himself. Curtis subsequently gave him overall command of the first two divisions, consisting mainly of German immigrants, while creating a 4th Division commanded by Col. Eugene A. Carr.

Curtis moved his headquarters south to Rolla, Missouri, to solidify Union control in Arkansas. In March 1862, his army won the Battle of Pea Ridge in northwest Arkansas. His success made him pensive rather than triumphant. A few days after the battle he wrote, "The scene is silent and sad. The vulture and the wolf now have the dominion and the dead friends and foes sleep in the same lonely graves." He was promoted to major general for his success, effective March 21, 1862. On the same day in late March that he heard about his promotion, he also found out that his twenty-year-old daughter Sadie died of typhoid fever in St. Louis.

After Pea Ridge, Curtis' small army moved east and invaded northeast Arkansas, capturing the city of Helena, Arkansas in July. While in Helena, his army attracted the attention of many escaped slaves. He had authorized the issuance of emancipation papers and it attracted a large number seeking them. In September, Curtis was given command of the District of Missouri, but Lincoln was soon forced to reassign him, after Curtis's abolitionist views led to conflict with the governor of Missouri. He was reassigned to command the Department of Kansas & Indian Territory.

In October 1863, his son Major Henry Zarah Curtis, adjutant to Brig. Gen. James G. Blunt, was killed by Quantrill's Raiders. In this surprise attack at the Battle of Baxter Springs, Quantrill's men wore Federal uniforms and gave no quarter. Samuel Curtis named Fort Zarah in memory of his son.

In 1864, Curtis returned to Missouri, fighting against the Confederate invasion led by Maj. Gen. Sterling Price. Curtis gathered the forces of his department together, including several regiments of Kansas State Militia, calling his force the Army of the Border. Price's incursion was halted by Curtis' victory at the Battle of Westport. Curtis was then reassigned to a completely different armed conflict, commanding the Army's "Department of the Northwest," which was in the closing phase of a military response to uprisings in southern Minnesota and Dakota Territory by Native Americans against settlers.

== Later life and death ==
In late 1865, he returned to Iowa where he was involved with the Union Pacific Railroad until his death the following year in Council Bluffs, Iowa. He is buried in Oakland Cemetery, in Keokuk.

== See also ==
- List of American Civil War generals (Union)
- Gen. Samuel R. Curtis House, listed on the National Register of Historic Places in Iowa

== Sources ==
- Boatner, Mark M. III (1988). The Civil War Dictionary (Revised ed.). New York: David McKay. ISBN 978-0-8129-1726-0.
- Eicher, John H., and Eicher, David J., Civil War High Commands, Stanford University Press, 2001, ISBN 0-8047-3641-3
- Shea, William & Hess, Earl, Pea Ridge: Civil War Campaign in the West. University of North Carolina Press, 1992. ISBN 0-8078-4669-4

U.S. House of Representatives
Preceded by Augustus Hall	Member of the U.S. House of Representatives from Iowa's 1st congressional district 1857–1861	Succeeded by James F. Wilson
