= Kansas in the American Civil War =

At the outbreak of the American Civil War in April 1861, Kansas was the newest U.S. state, admitted just months earlier in January. The state had formally rejected slavery by popular vote and vowed to fight on the side of the Union, though ideological divisions with neighboring Missouri, a slave state, had led to violent conflict in previous years and persisted for the duration of the war.

While Kansas was a rural frontier state, distant from the major theaters of war, and its Unionist government was never seriously threatened by Confederate military forces, several engagements did occur within its borders, as well as countless raids and skirmishes between local irregulars, including the Lawrence Massacre by pro-Confederate guerrillas under William Quantrill in August 1863. Later the state witnessed the defeat of Confederate General Sterling Price by Union General Alfred Pleasonton at the Battle of Mine Creek, the second-largest cavalry action of the war. Additionally, some of the Union's first Black regiments would form in the state of Kansas. These contributions would inform the complicated race relations in the state during the reconstruction era (1865–1877).

The decision of how Kansas would enter the Union was a pivotal one that forced the entire country to confront the political and social turmoil generated by the question of abolition and contributed to the strong division in sentiment that eventually erupted into war. The early violence there presaged the coming national conflict, and throughout the war, Kansas remained a staunchly loyal Union stronghold at the western edge of a border region otherwise populated by uneven governments and mixed sympathies.

== Background ==
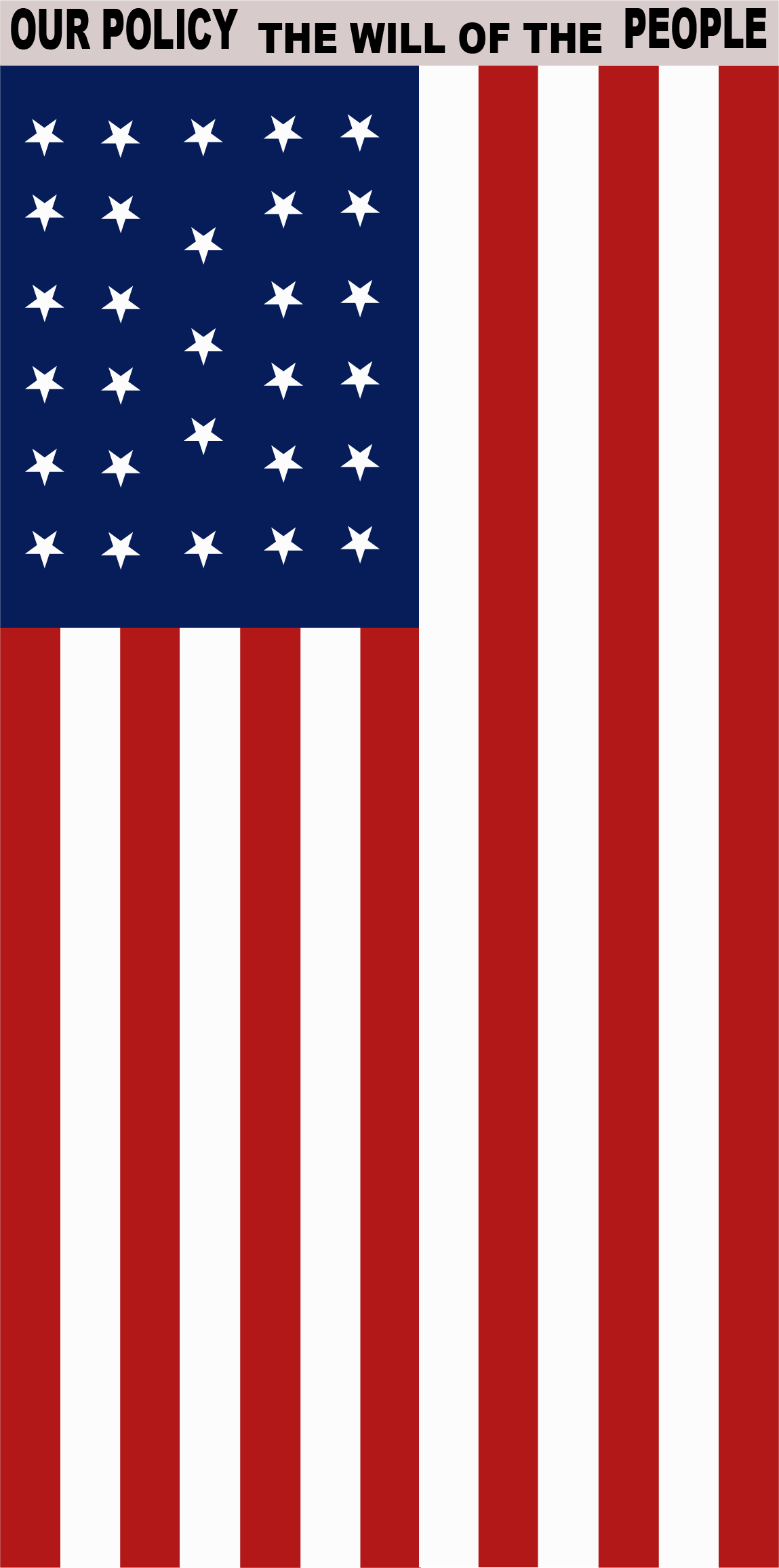
US flag that flew in a political event in the state from 1861-1863

After the Territory of Kansas approved the anti-slavery Wyandotte Constitution, it was admitted to the Union on January 29, 1861, in the midst of the national secession crisis: six states had already seceded, and five more would follow in the coming months. The Kansas–Nebraska Act of 1854 had rescinded the former Missouri Compromise and permitted the territories of Kansas and Nebraska to determine whether they would enter the Union as slave or free states by popular sovereignty. Violence between pro-slavery and anti-slavery groups began almost immediately. The conflict was especially bloody along the Kansas–Missouri border, where Missouri Border Ruffians and Kansas Free-Staters formed bands of partisan rangers to raid and pillage opposition strongholds, earning it the name "Bleeding Kansas". The Free-Staters included abolitionist John Brown, who in 1856 led a small militia with the goal to massacre five pro-slavery settlers in the territory. Upon hearing this news, Abraham Lincoln commented “We have a means provided for the expression of our belief in regard to Slavery—it is through the ballot box—the peaceful method provided by the Constitution.” Kansas' popular vote eventually chose against slavery, so Kansas would fight with the North.

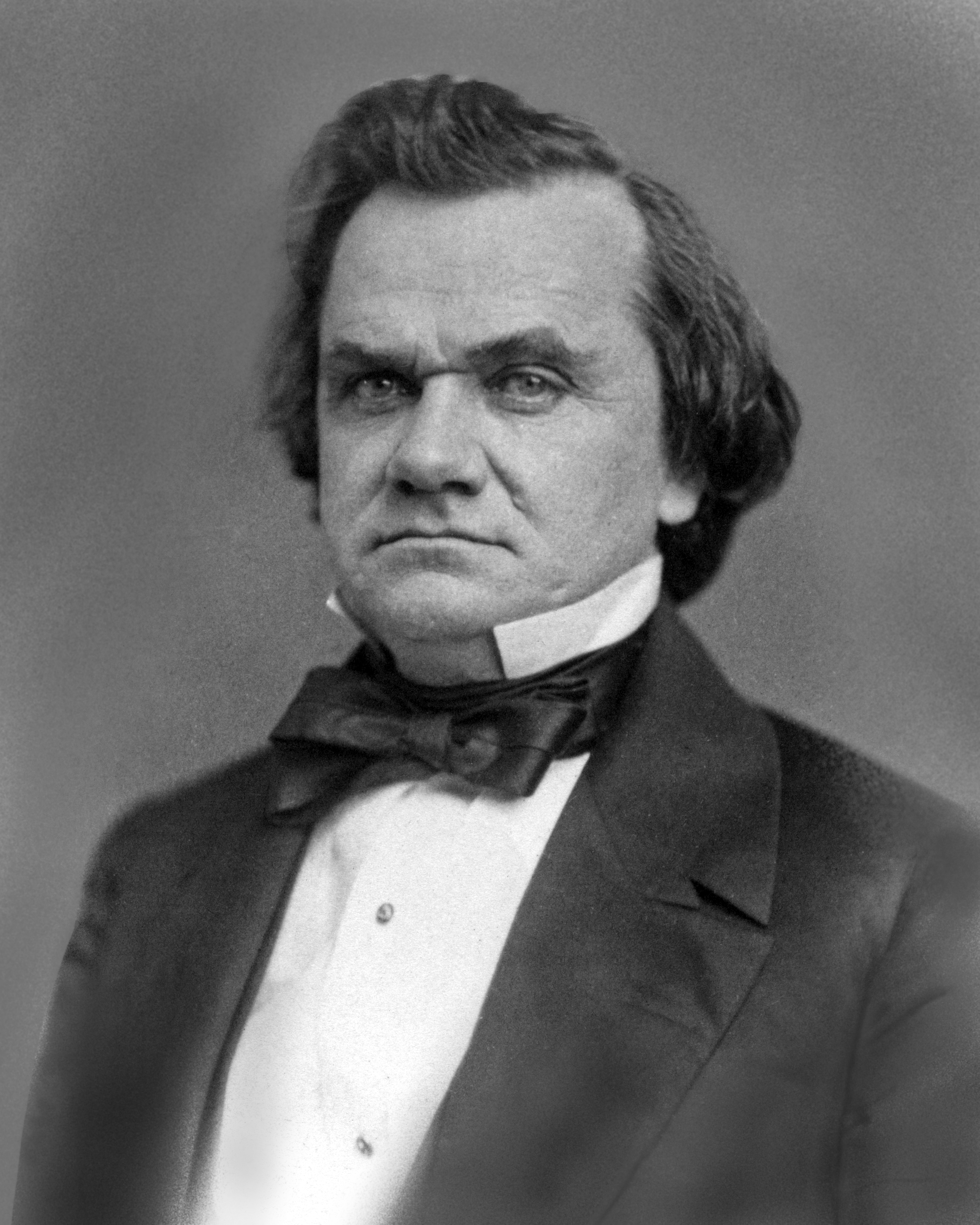
Senator Stephen A. Douglas (April 23, 1813 – June 3, 1861), a Democrat from Illinois, was instrumental in getting the Kansas-Nebraska Act through Congress, leading to the "Bleeding Kansas" conflict.

As the local military organizations had fallen into disuse, the state's government had no well-organized militia, no arms, accouterments or supplies, nothing with which to meet Union Army demands except the united will of officials and citizens.

== Military units ==
The first Kansas regiment was called on June 3, 1861, and the seventeenth, the last raised during the Civil War, on July 28, 1864. The entire quota assigned to Kansas was 16,654, and the number raised was 20,097, leaving a surplus of 3,443 to the credit of Kansas. About 1,000 Kansans joined Confederate forces since a number of people from the nation's south had settled in Kansas. There are no statistics on those serving the Confederacy, since some joined guerrilla units. This led to a 19th-century nickname for Kansas: the "Spartan State."

=== Black Regiments ===
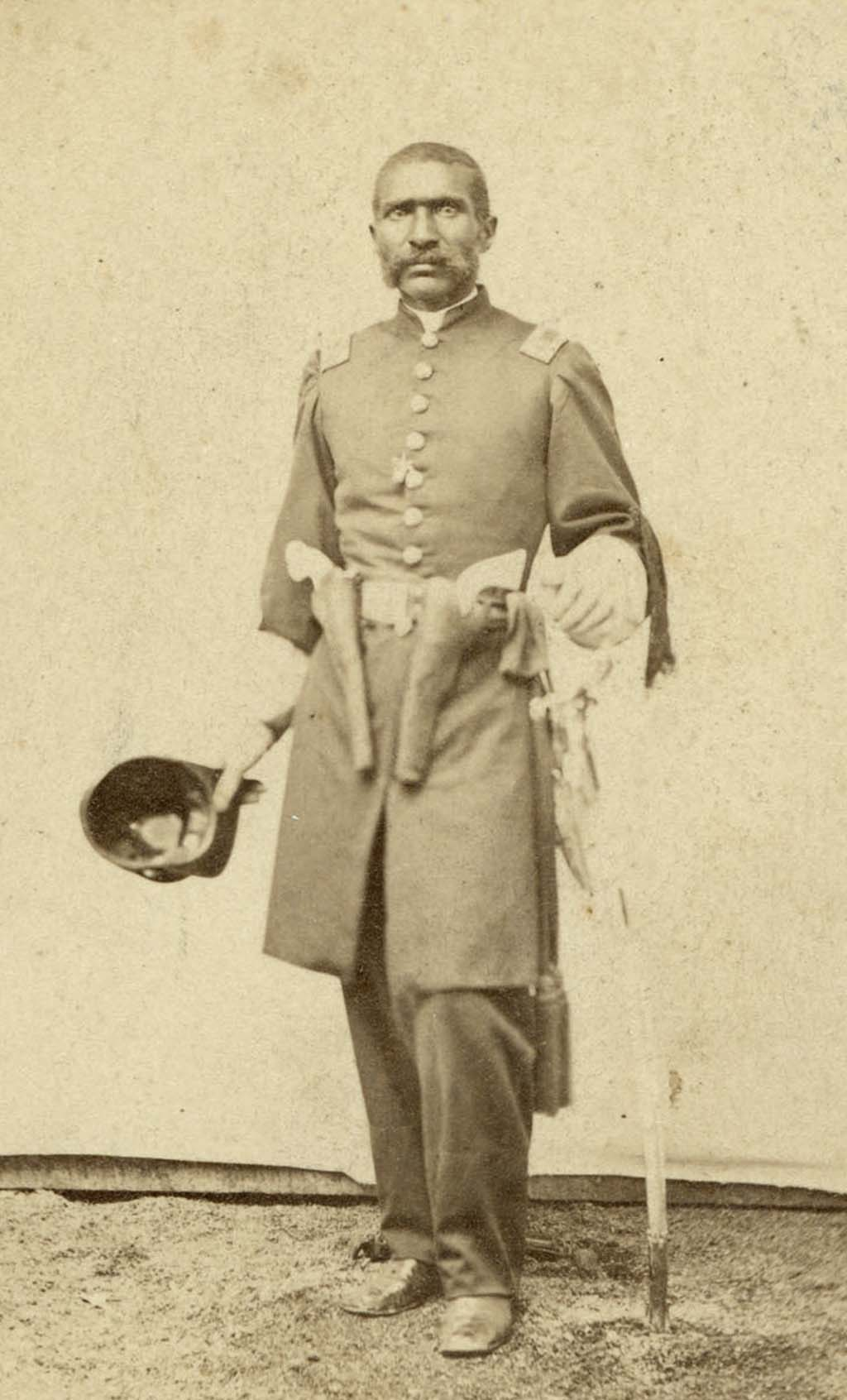
William D. Matthews (October 25, 1829 – March 2, 1906): The first captain of the 1st Kansas Colored Infantry Regiment. Photo Credit: Kansas State Historical Society.

Further Information: Military history of African Americans in the American Civil War

Kansas was the first state in the Union to enlist free Black men into the military. These units were consisted primarily of Black freedmen who had recently escaped slavery in Missouri and other surrounding slave states. While many were eager to fight, others were forced into enlistment by local authorities in the municipalities, mirroring the draft policies President Lincoln had implemented in 1863. Black Kansans enlisted into two regiments: the 1st Kansas Colored Infantry Regiment and the 2nd Kansas Colored Infantry Regiment. Both units would fight in Arkansas campaigns against Confederate troops in the area, notably at the Battle of Poison Spring and Battle of Jenkins' Ferry.

== Lawrence Massacre ==
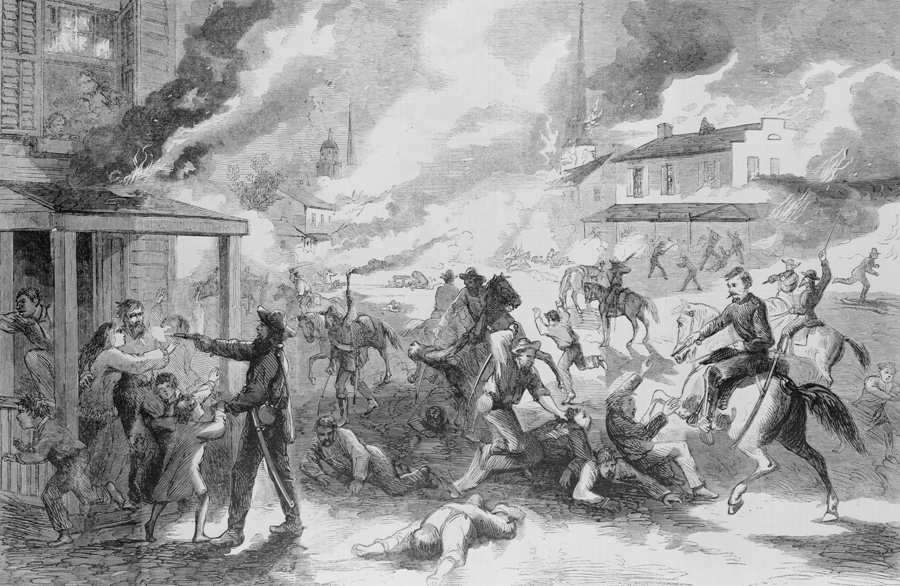
Quantrill's Raid into Lawrence, Kansas destroyed much of the city

The first action in Kansas was not between the rival Union and Confederate armies; it was an 1863 guerrilla raid by pro-slavery "bushwhackers", led by William C. Quantrill, who descended on Lawrence, a center of anti-slavery Unionist sentiment, and proceeded to sack the town, burning numerous buildings and executing about 180 men and boys. As the raiders could be heard shouting "Remember Osceola!", the attack was taken to be a reprisal for an earlier raid by anti-slavery "Jayhawkers" on Osceola, Missouri. Some believed that it was also a response to the recent deaths of some of the raiders' imprisoned womenfolk, when their jailhouse collapsed, perhaps by design, though recent research shows that the collapse was almost certainly accidental. The massacre outraged the Confederate government, which had granted recognition to Quantrill under the Partisan Ranger Act, but now withdrew support from irregular forces.

== Later engagements ==
The Battle of Baxter Springs, sometimes called the Baxter Springs Massacre, was a minor battle fought on October 6, 1863, near where the city of Baxter Springs now sits.

On October 25, 1864, a series of three battles occurred, the first two in Linn County, Kansas, with the final in Vernon County, Missouri. The first was the Battle of Marais des Cygnes (also called the "Battle of Trading Post"), the second, a cavalry battle, was the Battle of Mine Creek, a significant battle between mounted cavalry for Confederate forces and several brigades of Union cavalry that were pursuing General Price. They were between Major General Sterling Price, leading the Missouri expedition, against Union forces under Major General Alfred Pleasonton. Price, after going south from Kansas City, was initially met by Pleasonton at Marais des Cygnes. At the end of the day, the Confederate army as an effective fighting force was decimated and forced to withdraw into Arkansas.

== Kansas during Reconstruction ==
Since Kansas was part of the Union during the Civil War, federal troops were not stationed in Kansas as they were in the former Confederacy during Reconstruction. The perceived radical politics of the state led to many emancipated African Americans to migrate from the south to Kansas. Known as Exodusters, these migrants were received well by some and negatively by others. While Kansas was always a free state, there were still incidents of mob violence and Lynching by White Kansans for alleged crimes against White citizens by Black settlers. This violence was both condemned by pro-Black newspapers such as The Smokey Hill and the Republican Union, and encouraged by other media outlets run by journalists who were anti-slavery but also anti-black at the same time.

While some differences did occur, moderate and radical Republicans in Kansas largely agreed on bettering the condition of African American settlers on the basis of it being "a moral imperative." These efforts included expanding voting rights in the area to enforce the Fifteenth Amendment, but also opening schools for Black children; however, these schools were still segregated by race, and would legally remain so until the 20th century with the Brown v. Board of Education decision in 1954.
