= Marshall Cleveland =

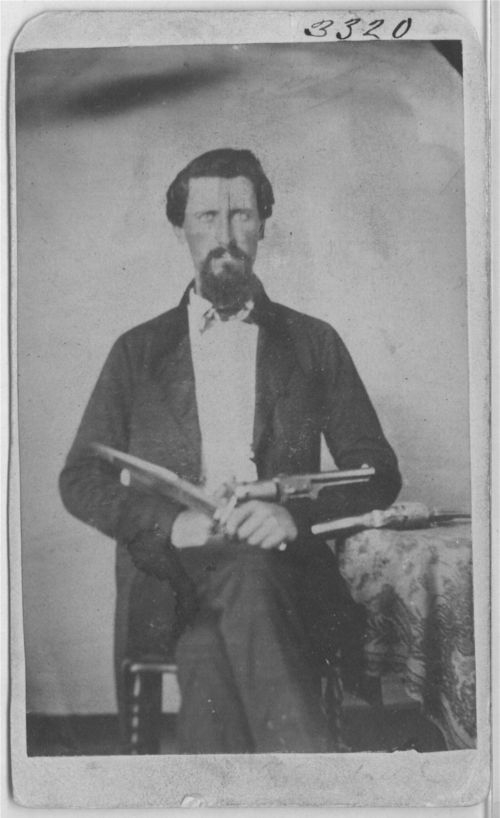
Marshall Cleveland in 1861.

Marshall Cleveland (c. 1832 – May 11, 1862) was a guerrilla fighter and criminal active during the American Civil War. Ostensibly a Jayhawker fighting for the Union, Cleveland indiscriminately plundered the Kansas-Missouri border until he was killed by members of the 6th Kansas Cavalry Regiment in 1862.

== Early life and Civil War ==
A native of New York, Cleveland had settled for a time in both Ohio and Missouri. After being arrested in the latter state, he fled to Kansas just as the Civil War was breaking out. In October 1861, Cleveland was chosen as a captain in Charles "Doc" Jennison's 7th Kansas Cavalry Regiment. In November of 1861, only a few weeks after officially joining Jennison's regiment, Cleveland resigned his formal commission, in part because he was rebuked by Daniel Read Anthony for wearing improper attire during a dress parade.

After leaving the 7th Cavalry, Cleveland began to ostensibly operate as an independent Jayhawker under the aegis of the Union; in actuality, he "brazenly worked both sides of the [Kansas-Missouri] border, robbing and murdering Unionist and rebel alike". Cleveland and his gang were based out of a saloon in Atchison, Kansas, as the city had less of a military presence than either Ft. Leavenworth and St. Joseph. From this base, Cleveland self-declared himself "Marshal of Kansas".

Cleveland was initially tolerated. However, his decision to indiscriminately freeboot under the cover of Unionism quickly earned him the ire of the Union military, and they stationed troops at Winthrop, Missouri in a vain attempt to capture him. Eventually, Major General David Hunter sent members of the 6th Kansas Cavalry Regiment to arrest Cleveland. They located him in Osawatomie, Kansas. After being surrounded, Cleverland surrendered to Lt. Anson J. Walker before attempting to escape on horseback. He was subsequently shot and killed by members of the 6th.
