= Jayhawker =

Kansans during Bleeding Kansas

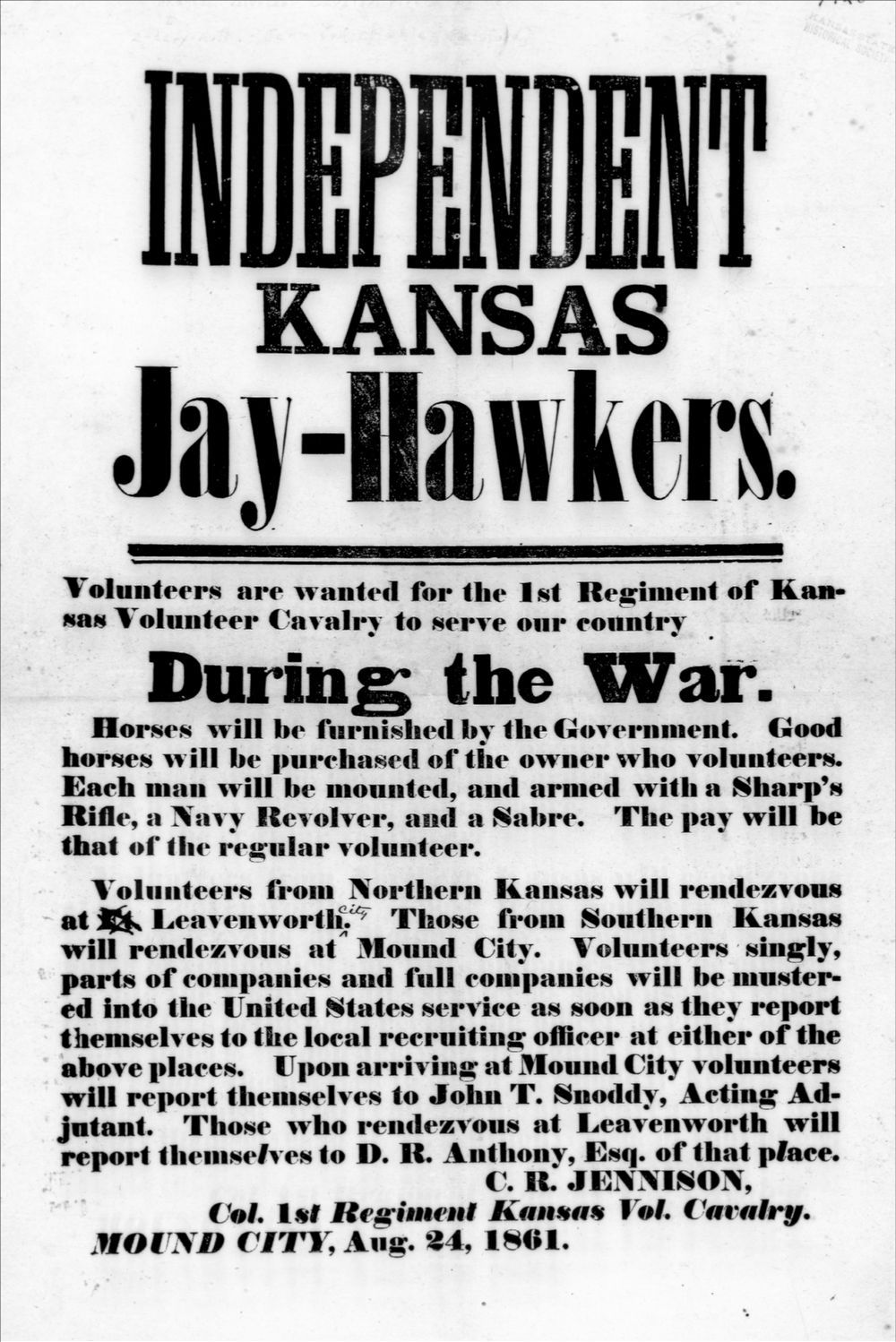
Broadside recruiting men for the Independent Kansas Jay-Hawkers, 1st Kansas Volunteer Cavalry.

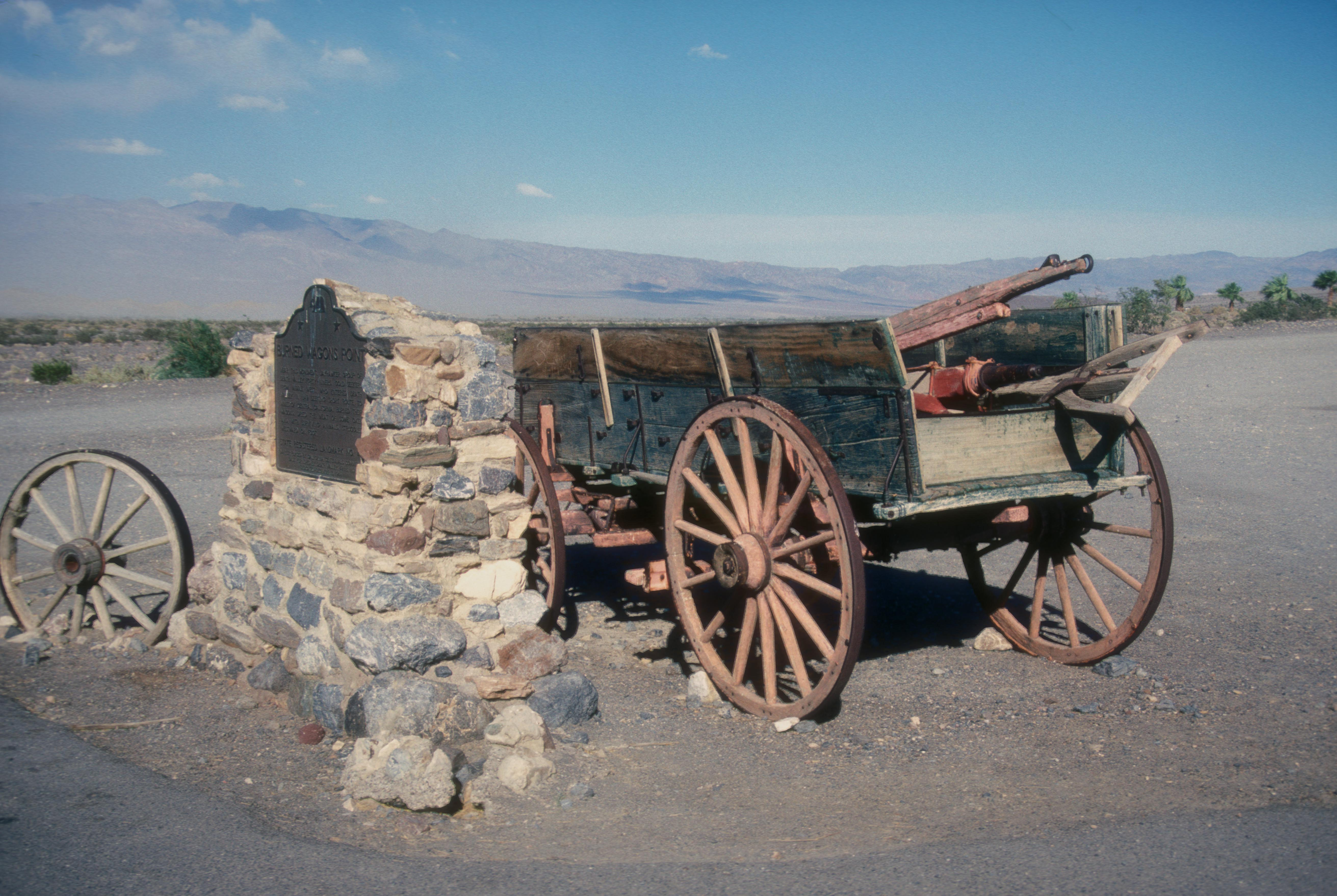
Burned Wagons Point in Death Valley, where the Jayhawker group of 49ers killed their oxen, chopped the wagons, dried the meat, and set off westward on foot.

Jayhawker is a term that came to prominence in Kansas Territory during the Bleeding Kansas period of the 1850s; it was adopted by militant bands affiliated with the free-state cause during the American Civil War. These groups were guerrillas who often clashed with pro-slavery groups from Missouri, known at the time in Kansas Territory as "Border Ruffians" or "Bushwhackers". After the Civil War, the word "Jayhawker" became synonymous with the people of Kansas, or anybody born in Kansas. Today a modified version of the term, Jayhawk, is used as a nickname for a native-born Kansan and is the mascot of the University of Kansas, Kansas' flagship university

== Origin ==
=== Early usage ===
The term did not appear in the first American edition of Burtlett's Dictionary of Americanisms (1848) but was entered into the fourth improved and enlarged edition in 1877 as a cant name for a freebooting armed man in the western United States.

It was established that the term was adopted as a nickname by a group of emigrants from Illinois traveling to California in 1849, who got stuck in Death Valley.

In 1858–59, the slang term "Jayhawking" became widely used as a synonym for stealing. Examples include:

O'ive been over till Eph. Kepley's a-jayhawking.

Men are now at Fort Scott, working by the day for a living as loyal as Gen. Blunt himself, who have had every hoof confiscated, or jayhawked, which is about the same thing, for all the benefit it is to the Government.

=== Missouri–Kansas border lexicon ===
The term became part of the lexicon of the Missouri–Kansas border in about 1858, during the Kansas territorial period. The term came to be used to describe militant bands nominally associated with the free-state cause. One early Kansas history contained this succinct characterization of the Jayhawkers:

Confederated at first for defense against pro-slavery outrages, but ultimately falling more or less completely into the vocation of robbers and assassins, they have received the name—whatever its origin may be—of jayhawkers.

Farmer's Americanisms, old and new (1889) linked the term with anti-slavery advocates of late 1850s in Kansas. G. Murlin Welch, a historian of the territorial period, describes the Jayhawkers as bands of men that were willing to fight, kill, and rob for a variety of motives that included defense against pro-slavery "Border Ruffians", abolition, driving pro-slavery settlers from their claims of land, revenge, and/or plunder and personal profit.

While the "Bleeding Kansas" era is generally regarded as beginning in 1856, the earliest documented uses of the term "jayhawker" during the Kansas troubles were in the late 1850s, after the issue of slavery in Kansas had essentially been decided in favor of the Free State cause. The earliest mention of the name comes from the autobiography of August Bondi, who came to Kansas in 1855. Bondi said he observed General James Lane addressing his forces as Jayhawkers in December 1857.

Another early reference to the term (as applied to the Kansas troubles) emerging at that time is provided in the retrospective account of Kansas newspaperman John McReynolds. McReynolds reportedly picked up the term from Pat Devlin, a Free State partisan described as "nothing more nor less than a dangerous bully." In mid-1858, McReynolds asked Devlin where he had acquired two fine horses that he had recently brought into the town of Osawatomie. Devlin replied that he "got them as the Jayhawk gets its birds in Ireland", which he explained as follows: "In Ireland a bird, which is called the Jayhawk, flies about after dark, seeking the roosts and nests of smaller birds, and not only robs nests of eggs, but frequently kills the birds." McReynolds understood Devlin had acquired his horses in the same manner the Jayhawk got its prey, and he used the term in a Southern Kansas Herald newspaper column to describe a case of theft in the ongoing partisan violence. The term was quickly picked up by other newspapers, and "Jayhawkers" soon came to denote the militants and thieves affiliated with the Free State cause.

Other historic descriptions of the term have varied. Writing on the troubles in Kansas Territory in 1859, one journalist stated the jayhawk was a hawk that preys on the jay. One of the "Jayhawkers of '49" recalled that the name sprang from their observation of hawks gracefully sailing in the air until "the audience of jays and other small but jealous and vicious birds sail in and jab him until he gets tired of show life and slides out of trouble in the lower earth."

=== Kansas Union troops ===
The meaning of the term evolved in the opening year of the American Civil War. When Charles Jennison, one of the territorial-era jayhawkers, was authorized to raise a regiment of cavalry to serve in the Union army, he characterized the unit as the "Independent Kansas Jay-Hawkers" on a recruiting poster. The regiment was officially termed the 7th Regiment Kansas Volunteer Cavalry but was popularly known as Jennison's Jayhawkers. Thus, the term became associated with Union troops from Kansas. After the regiment was banished from the Missouri–Kansas border in the spring of 1862, it went on to participate in several battles including Union victories of the Battle of Iuka and the Second Battle of Corinth. Late in the war, the regiment returned to Kansas and contributed to Union victory in one of the last major battles in the Missouri–Kansas theater, the Battle of Mine Creek.

The term was further applied to any Kansas troops engaged in punitive operations against the civilian population of western Missouri, in which the plundering and arson that characterized the territorial struggles were repeated but on a much larger scale. For example, "Jayhawkers" encompassed Senator Jim Lane and his Kansas Brigade, which sacked and burned Osceola, Missouri, in the opening months of the war after their defeat by Sterling Price's Missouri State Guard in the Battle of Dry Wood Creek.

=== Jayhawking in western Missouri ===
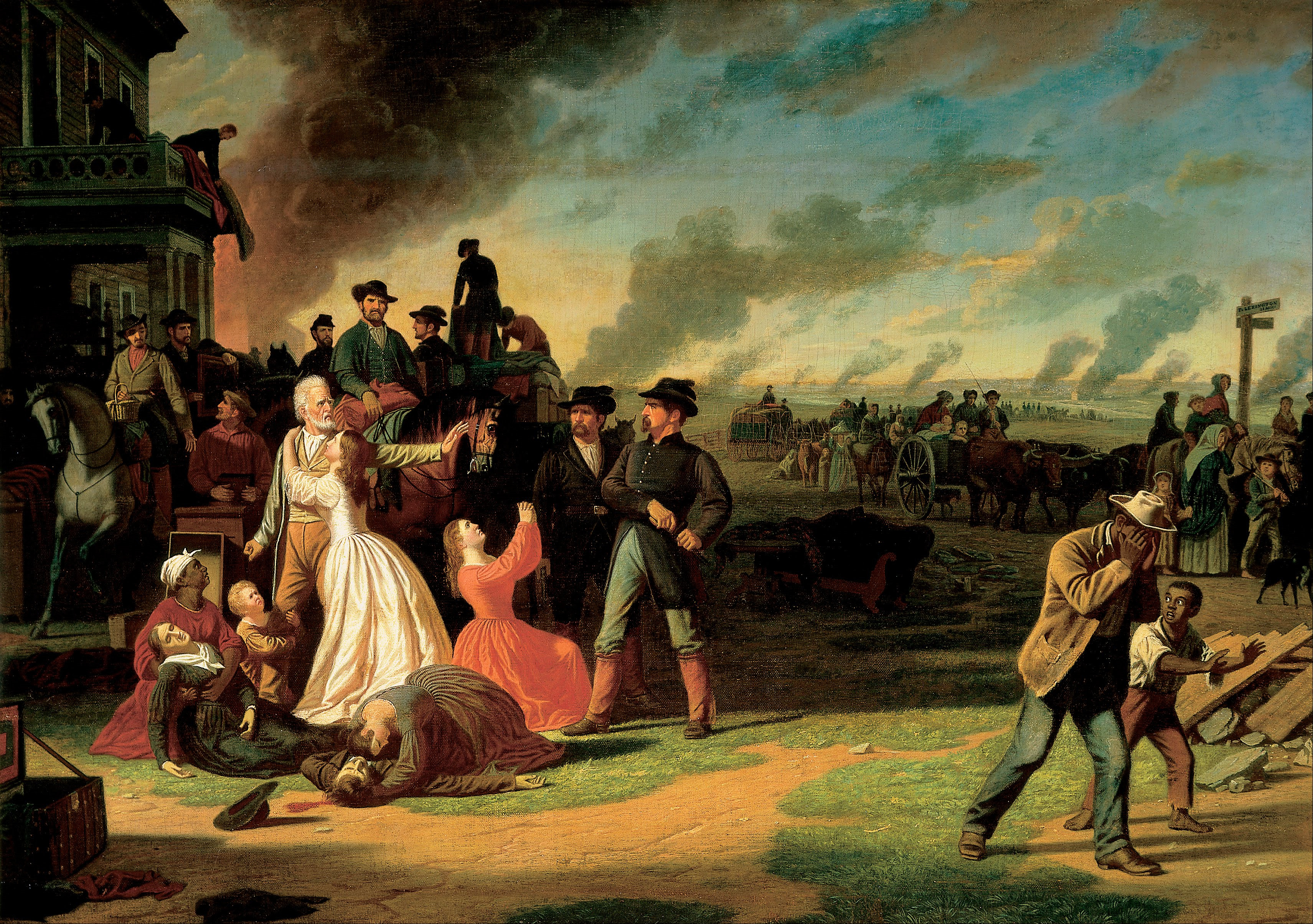
George Caleb Bingham's depiction of the execution of General Order No. 11; Union General Thomas Ewing Jr. observes the red legs carrying out the order

Jayhawking was a prominent aspect of Union military operations in western Missouri during the first year of the war. In addition to Osceola, the Missouri towns of Morristown, Papinsvile, Butler, Dayton, and Columbus and large numbers of rural homes were pillaged by Kansas troops led by Lane, Charles R. Jennison, Daniel Read Anthony, and James Montgomery, among others. Scores if not hundreds of Missouri families were burned out of their homes in the middle of the winter of 1862.

Union Major General Henry Halleck on January 18, 1862 in a letter to General Lorenzo Thomas described Jennison's regiment as "no better than a band of robbers; they cross the line, rob, steal, plunder, and burn whatever they can lay their hands upon. They disgrace the name and uniform of American soldiers and are driving good Union men into the ranks of the secession army." There were no charges against Lane, Jennison, or other officers under Lane's command for their role in the jayhawking raids of 1861–1862, but Union General David H. Hunter succeeded in curtailing Lane's military role, and units of Kansas troops such as the 7th Regiment Kansas Volunteer Cavalry were shuffled off to other theaters of the war.

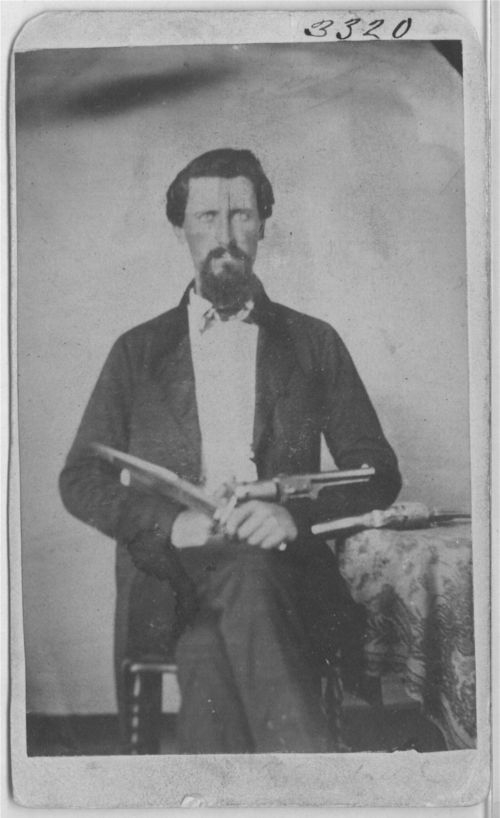
Marshall Cleveland

Further compounding confusion over what the term Jayhawker meant along the Missouri–Kansas border was its use in describing outright criminals like Marshall Cleveland, a captain of Jennison's Regiment, who resigned and turned to jayhawking. Cleveland operated under cover of supposed Unionism but was outside the Union military command.

A newspaper reporter traveling through Kansas in 1863 provided definitions of jayhawker and associated terms:

Jayhawkers, Red Legs, and Bushwhackers are everyday terms in Kansas and Western Missouri. A Jayhawker is a Unionist who professes to rob, burn out and murder only rebels in arms against the government. A Red Leg is a Jayhawker originally distinguished by the uniform of red leggings. A Red Leg, however, is regarded as more purely an indiscriminate thief and murderer than the Jayhawker or Bushwhacker. A Bushwhacker is a rebel Jayhawker, or a rebel who bands with others for the purpose of preying upon the lives and property of Union citizens. They are all lawless and indiscriminate in their iniquities.

=== Guerrilla fighting ===
The depredations of the Jayhawkers contributed to the descent of the Missouri–Kansas border region into some of the most vicious guerrilla fighting of the Civil War. In the first year of the war, much of the movable wealth in western Missouri had been transferred to Kansas, and large swaths of western Missouri had been laid waste by an assortment of Kansas Jayhawkers ranging from outlaws and independent military bands to rogue federal troops such as Lane's Brigade and Jennison's Jayhawkers. In February 1862, the Union command instituted martial law due to "the crime of armed depredations or jay-hawking having reached a height dangerous to the peace and posterity to the whole State (Kansas) and seriously compromising the Union cause in the border counties of Missouri."

One expert on the Jayhawkers stated that the Border War would have been bad enough given the fighting between secessionist and unionist Missourians, "but it was basically Kansas craving for revenge and Kansas craving for loot that set the tone of the war. Nowhere else, with the grim exception of the East Kentucky and East Tennessee mountains, did the Civil War degenerate so completely into a squalid, murderous, slugging match as it did in Kansas and Missouri." The most infamous event in this war of raids and reprisals was Confederate leader William Quantrill's raid on Lawrence, Kansas, known as the Lawrence Massacre. In response to Quantrill's raid, the Union command issued General Order No. 11 (1863), the forced depopulation of specified Missouri border counties.

Intended to eliminate sanctuary and sustenance for pro-Confederate guerrilla fighters, it was enforced by troops from Kansas and provided an excuse for a final round of plundering, arson, and summary execution perpetrated against the civilian population of western Missouri. In the words of one observer, "the Kansas–Missouri border was a disgrace even to barbarism."

=== Different meanings ===
As the war continued, the term came to be used by Confederates as a derogatory term for any troops from Kansas, but the term also had different meanings in different parts of the country. In Arkansas, it was used by Confederate Arkansans as an epithet for any marauder, robber, or thief regardless of Union or Confederate affiliation. In Louisiana, it was used to describe anti-Confederate guerrillas; in Texas, it was used for free-booting bands of draft dodgers and deserters. Over time, proud of their state's contributions to the end of slavery and the preservation of the Union, Kansans embraced "Jayhawker," and it came to be applied to people or items related to Kansas.

== Relationship to the University of Kansas Jayhawk ==
The University of Kansas athletic logo

When the University of Kansas (KU) fielded its first football team in 1890, the team was called the Jayhawkers. Over time, the name was gradually supplanted by its shorter variant, and KU's sports teams are now exclusively known as the Kansas Jayhawks. The link between the term "Jayhawkers" and any specific kind of bird, if such an association ever existed, had been lost or at least obscured by the time KU's mascot was invented in 1912, which was meant to serve as a visual representation of the Jayhawker movement, an homage by the university to the state's history. The originator of the mascot, Henry Maloy, struggled for over two years to create a pictorial symbol for the team, until hitting upon the bird idea. As explained by Maloy, "the term 'jayhawk' in the school yell was a verb and the term 'Jayhawkers' was the noun."

In 2011, the town of Osceola, Missouri, produced a declaration condemning what city leadership viewed as a connection between the Jayhawk mascot and the historical Jayhawkers who burned down the town in the 1861 Sacking of Osceola.

In 2017, the KU football team unveiled uniforms with an American flag on the helmet, blue jerseys, and red pants which featured the words "Kansas Jay-Hawkers" above a seal featuring a sword and a rifle. KU athletics stated that the red pants was an homage to the term "Red Legs."

== Cultural influence ==
- The movie The Jayhawkers! (1959) depicts a charismatic leader (Jeff Chandler) of a new independent Republic of Kansas in a showdown with an ex-renegade raider (Fess Parker), sent by the military governor to capture him and bring him to justice.
- The Wichita, Kansas wing of the Commemorative Air Force is known as the Jayhawk Wing.
- The VII Corps of the United States Army official nickname was The Jayhawk Corps.
- The United States Army Company A of the 9th aviation battalion of the 9th Infantry Division official nickname was The Jayhawks.
- The United States Coast Guard operates the medium range twin engine helicopter HH-60 Jayhawk in the roles of maritime patrol, interdiction, and search and rescue.
- The United States Navy operates the AQM-37 Jayhawk high speed target drone.
- The United States Air Force and the Japan Air Self-Defense Force operate the advanced pilot trainer T-1 Jayhawk for students selected to fly strategic/tactical airlift or tanker aircraft.
- The 184th Intel Wing call sign is the Fighting Jayhawks, and previously the Flying Jayhawks for many years before losing assigned aircraft.

== See also ==
- Quantrill's Raiders
- German Americans in the Civil War
- William Sloan Tough
