= 1953 New York City mayoral election =

- November 3, 1953
- Registered: 2,369,858
- Turnout: 2,244,146; 94.69%
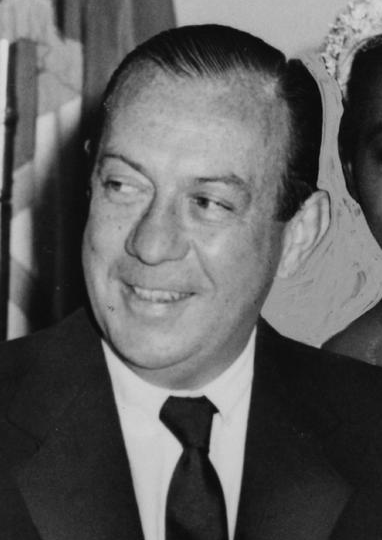

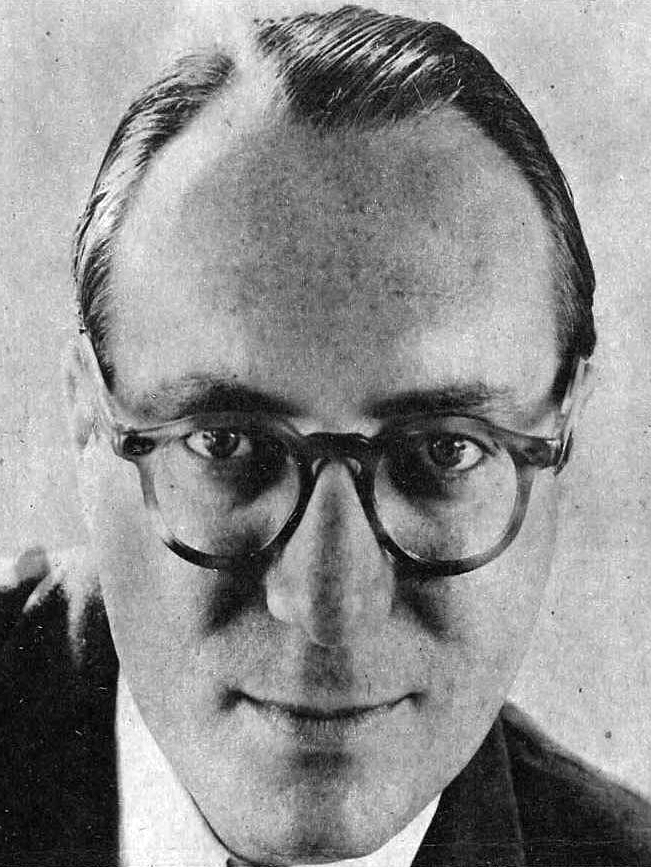
Candidate	Robert F. Wagner, Jr.	Harold Riegelman	Rudolph Halley
Party	Democratic	Republican	Liberal
Alliance			Independent
Popular vote	1,022,626	661,591	467,104
Percentage	46.3%	30.0%	21.2%
- Results by Borough; Wagner: 40–50% 50–60% Riegelman: 40–50%
Mayor before election
Vincent R. Impellitteri
Independent
Elected Mayor
Robert F. Wagner, Jr.
Democratic

The 1953 New York City mayoral election occurred on Tuesday, November 3, 1953. Incumbent mayor Vincent R. Impellitteri ran for re-election to a second term in office but lost the Democratic nomination to Robert F. Wagner Jr. Wagner went on to win the general election with a decisive plurality in a three-way race against Republican Harold Riegelman and Liberal Rudolph Halley.

Wagner enjoyed the support of the powerful Tammany Hall political machine, easily securing him a victory.

Wagner received 46.33% of the vote to Riegelman's 29.97%, a Democratic victory margin of 16.36%. Halley finished in third with 21.16%.

== Democratic nomination ==
=== Candidates ===
- Robert F. Wagner Jr., Manhattan Borough President
- Vincent R. Impellitteri, incumbent mayor since 1950

=== Campaign ===
Wagner was supported by Tammany Hall and Edward J. Flynn's political machine.

=== Results ===
Robert F. Wagner Jr. defeated incumbent Mayor Vincent R. Impellitteri for the Democratic nomination.

Democratic primary results
Party	Candidate	Votes	%
Democratic	Robert F. Wagner Jr.	350,474	64.14%
Democratic	Vincent R. Impellitteri (incumbent)	181,295	33.18%
Democratic	Robert B. Blaikie	9,317	1.71%
Democratic	John C. Sullivan	5,300	0.97%
Total votes		546,386	100.0%

== Liberal nomination ==
=== Background ===
Rudolph Halley's election as president of the New York City Council as the Liberal candidate in 1951, led to Adolf A. Berle stating that the party could "take over the administration of the City of New York".

=== Candidates ===
The Liberals wanted to form a coalition with the Republicans rather than the Democrats and David Dubinsky met with Young Republicans to discuss a possible coalition. Ralph Bunche, Jacob Javits, Newbold Morris, and Nelson Rockefeller were considered as possible candidates.

=== Campaign ===
Javits was the favorite candidate of the party leadership and Berle told him that he could get the New York Herald Tribune and New York Post to endorse him. Javits wanted to run, but did not want to break from Governor Thomas E. Dewey. Dewey gave Javits permission to run. Maurice Calman, a former Socialist alderman, and Charles Rubinstein, an American Labor Party city council candidate, opposed nominating Javits and believed that Halley could win as an independent candidate. Berle attempted to read the names of five possible mayoral candidates at the party's annual dinner, but could not get past the first name, Halley's, due to "prolonged applause and cheers".

Liberal leadership soured on Javits and Berle stated that Javits was "trying to be both" a Republican and independent. Berle also wrote in his diary that "the Republicans are not popular on the street". The Liberals attempted to negotiate with the Republicans, but they rejected endorsing Halley and were unsure if they would nominate Javits. Halley was given the Liberal nomination on July 13, 1953.

== General election ==
=== Candidates ===
- Rudolph Halley, President of the New York City Council (Liberal and Independent Citizens)
- Nathan Karp (Industrial Government)
- Clifford T. McAvoy, former representative of the United Electrical, Radio and Machine Workers of America (American Labor)
- Harold Riegelman, attorney and Postmaster of New York City (Republican)
- Robert F. Wagner Jr., Manhattan Borough President (Democratic)
- David Loeb Weiss, electrical worker and filmmaker (Socialist Workers)

=== Campaign ===
Halley's campaign was weakened by facing Wagner, rather than Impellitteri. Ben Davidson stated that "Halley against Impellitteri was one thing. Halley against Wagner was another thing". One Liberal club in Brooklyn endorsed Wagner.

=== Results ===
Halley had the best performance for a Liberal in New York City's mayoral election at that point.

1953 New York City mayoral election
Party	Candidate	Votes	%	±%
Democratic	Robert F. Wagner Jr.	1,022,626	46.32%	
Republican	Harold Riegelman	661,591	29.97%	
Liberal	Rudolph Halley	428,690	19.42%	
Independent	Rudolph Halley	38,416	1.74%	
Total	Rudolph Halley	467,106	21.16%	
American Labor	Clifford T. McAvoy	53,045	2.40%	
Socialist Workers	David Loeb Weiss	2,054	0.09%	
Industrial Government	Nathan Karp	916	0.04%	
Write-in		180	0.00%	
Total votes		2,207,518	100.00%	

==== By borough ====
1953	party	Manhattan	The Bronx	Brooklyn	Queens	Richmond [Staten Is.]	Total	%
Robert F. Wagner, Jr.	Democratic	236,960	206,771	339,970	207,918	31,007	1,022,626	46.3%
Robert F. Wagner, Jr.	Democratic	47.9%	46.2%	46.6%	40.6%	51.8%	1,022,626	46.3%
Harold Riegelman	Republican	147,876	97,224	183,968	208,829	23,694	661,591	30.0%
Harold Riegelman	Republican	29.9%	21.7%	25.2%	40.8%	39.6%	661,591	30.0%
Rudolph Halley	Liberal	76,884	112,825	162,275	73,192	3,514	428,690	19.4%
Rudolph Halley	Independent	7,648	9,853	13,264	7,356	295	38,416	1.7%
Rudolph Halley	Total	84,532	122,678	175,539	80,548	3,809	467,106	21.1%
Rudolph Halley	Total	17.1%	27.4%	24.1%	15.7%	6.4%	467,106	21.1%
Clifford T. McAvoy	American Labor Party	14,904	13,290	17,337	7,182	332	53,045	2.4%

=== Aftermath ===
The Liberal Party of New York won over five times as many votes as the American Labor Party in Manhattan, and eight-to-ten times as many in the other boroughs.

Vito Marcantonio later claimed that the poor performance of the American Labor Party in the mayoral election resulted in them failing to receive over 50,000 votes, enough to maintain ballot access, in the 1954 gubernatorial election. He claimed that communists sabotaged the McAvoy campaign by implying that they approved voting for Halley. The ALP voted to dissolve itself in 1956.

== Works cited ==
- Soyer, Daniel (2021). Left in the Center: The Liberal Party of New York and the Rise and Fall of American Social Democracy. Cornell University Press. ISBN 9781501759888. JSTOR 10.7591/j.ctv1hw3x50.2.
