= Daniel R. Anthony Jr. =

American politician (1870–1931)

Daniel Read Anthony Jr.
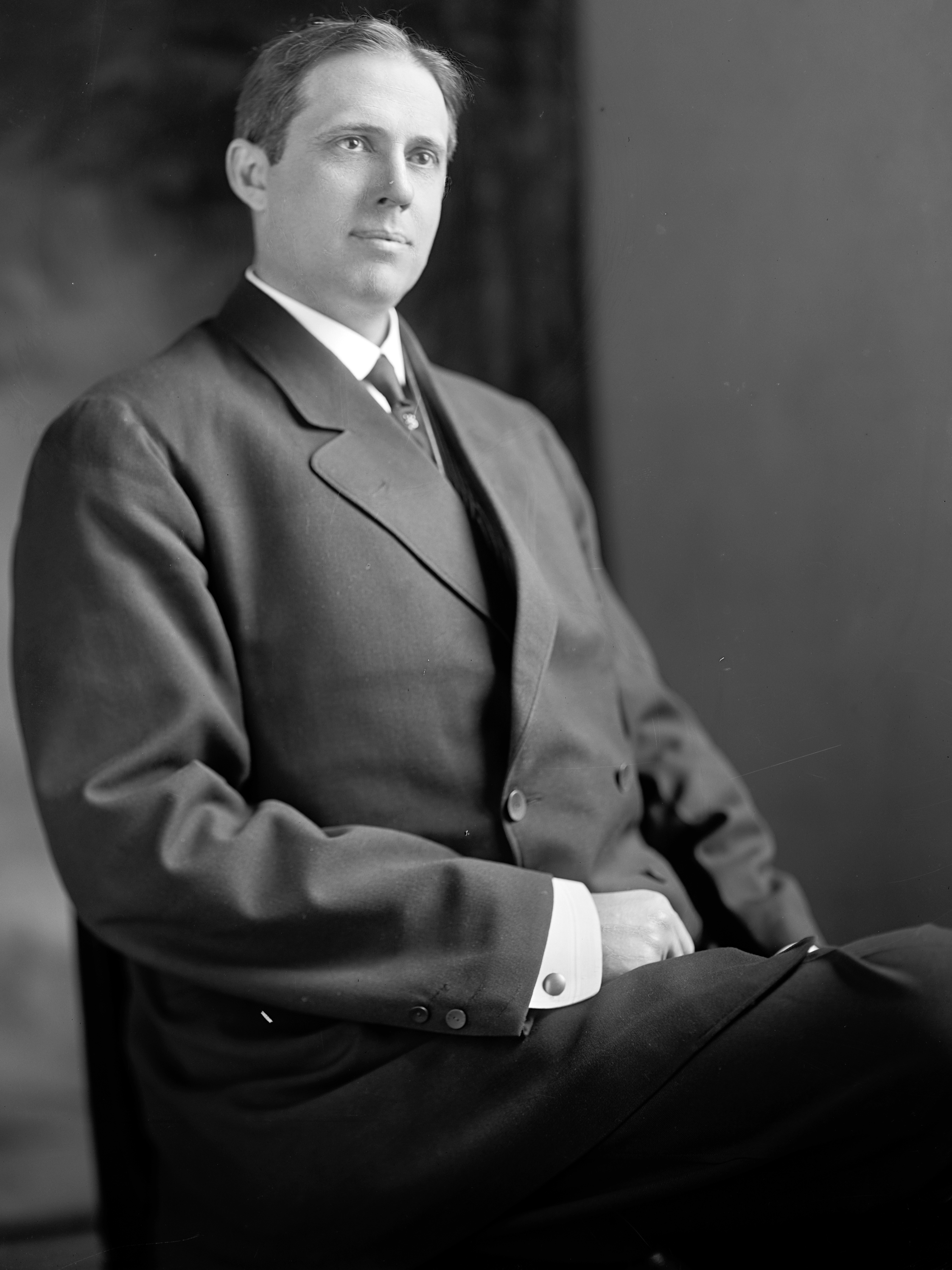

Member of the U.S. House of Representatives from Kansas's 1st district
- In office May 23, 1907 – March 3, 1929
- Preceded by: Charles Curtis
- Succeeded by: William P. Lambertson

Personal details
- Born: August 22, 1870 Leavenworth, Kansas, U.S.
- Died: August 4, 1931 (aged 60) Leavenworth, Kansas, U.S.
- Party: Republican
- Parent: Daniel Read Anthony (father)
- Relatives: Susan B. Anthony (aunt); Mary Stafford Anthony (aunt)

Daniel Read Anthony Jr. (August 22, 1870 – August 4, 1931) was an American Republican politician and a nephew of suffragist and political leader Susan B. Anthony.

He was the son of newspaper publisher Daniel Read Anthony. He was born in Leavenworth, Kansas, on August 22, 1870; attended the public schools as well as the Michigan Military Academy at Orchard Lake, Michigan; enrolled at the University of Michigan at Ann Arbor; studied law; was admitted to the bar, but did not practice extensively; engaged in newspaper work; appointed postmaster of Leavenworth, Kansas, on June 22, 1898, and served until June 30, 1902, when a successor was appointed; Mayor of Leavenworth, 1903–1905; became manager and editor of the Leavenworth Times in 1904.

He was elected as a Republican to House of Representatives of the 60th Congress to fill the vacancy caused by the resignation of Charles Curtis—who was elevated to the Senate; Anthony was re-elected in this capacity to the nine succeeding Congresses and served in the House from May 23, 1907, to March 3, 1929; well known for co-introducing, along with Senator Curtis, in December 1923 the first rendition of the proposed Equal Rights Amendment to the United States Constitution; chairman, Committee on Appropriations in the House during the 70th Congress; was not a candidate for renomination in 1928; resumed his former business pursuits; died in Leavenworth on August 4, 1931; interment in Mount Muncie Cemetery.

== See also ==
- List of mayors of Leavenworth, Kansas

U.S. House of Representatives
Preceded by Charles Curtis	Member of the U.S. House of Representatives from Kansas's 1st congressional district 1907 - 1929	Succeeded by William P. Lambertson
