= 7th Kansas Cavalry Regiment =

Union Army unit of the American Civil War

- Active: October 28, 1861 – September 29, 1865
- Country: United States
- Allegiance: Union
- Branch: Cavalry
- Engagements: Battle of Iuka (Companies B & E); Second Battle of Corinth; Battle of Little Blue River; Second Battle of Independence; Battle of Byram's Ford; Battle of Mine Creek

The 7th Kansas Cavalry Regiment (also known as "Jennison's Jayhawkers") was a cavalry regiment that served in the Union Army during the American Civil War.

== Service ==
The 7th Kansas Cavalry was organized at Fort Leavenworth, Kansas on October 28, 1861. It mustered in for three years under the command of Colonel Charles R. Jennison.

The regiment was attached to Department of Kansas to June 1862. 5th Division, Army of the Mississippi, to September 1862. 2nd Brigade, Cavalry Division, Army of the Mississippi, to November 1862. 1st Brigade, Cavalry Division, XIII Corps, Department of the Tennessee, to December 1862. 2nd Brigade, Cavalry Division, XVI Corps, Army of the Tennessee, to March 1863. Cavalry Brigade, District of Corinth, 2nd Division, XVI Corps, to June 1863. 3rd Brigade, 1st Cavalry Division, XVI Army Corps, to August 1863. 1st Brigade, 1st Cavalry Division, XVI Corps, to February 1864. Unattached, 1st Cavalry Division, XVI Corps, to June 1864. 1st Brigade, 1st Cavalry Division, District of West Tennessee, to September 1864. District of St. Louis, Missouri, Department of Missouri, to July 1865. Department of Kansas to September 1865.

The 7th Kansas Cavalry mustered out of service at Fort Leavenworth on September 29, 1865.

== Detailed service ==
Duty in western Missouri until January 31, 1862. Spring Hill, Missouri, October 21, 1861 (1 company). Little Blue November 11, 1861 (Companies A, B, and H). Little Santa Fe November 20. Independence, Little Blue, November 20 (detachment). Columbus, Missouri, January 9, 1862.

Moved to Humboldt, Kansas, January 31, and duty there until March 25. Moved to Fort Leavenworth, Kansas, March 25; then to Columbus, Kentucky, May 18-June 2, and to Corinth, Mississippi, June 7, escorting working parties on Mobile & Ohio Railroad and arriving at Corinth July 10; then moved to Jacinto and Rienzi, Mississippi, July 18–28.

Expedition from Rienzi to Ripley, Mississippi, July 27–29. Reconnaissance to Jacinto and Bay Springs and skirmish August 4–7. Reconnaissance from Rienzi to Hay Springs August 18–21. Marietta and Bay Springs August 20. Kossuth August 27. Rienzi September 9 and 18. Battle of Iuka, Mississippi, September 19 (Companies B and E). Ruckersville October 1 (detachment). Baldwin October 2. Battle of Corinth October 3–4. Pursuit to Ripley October 5–12. Ruckersville October 6.

Grant's Central Mississippi Campaign October 31, 1862, to January 10, 1863. Capture of Ripley November 2, 1862. Orizaba November 3. Jumpertown November 5. Reconnaissance from LaGrange November 8–9. Lamar and Coldwater November 8. Holly Springs November 13, 28 and 29. Waterford or Lumpkin's Mill November 26–30. About Oxford December 1–3. Tallahatchie December 2. Water Valley December 4. Coffeeville December 5. Moved to Moscow, Tennessee, December 31, and duty on line of Memphis & Charleston Railroad at Germantown, Tennessee, until April 14, 1863. Joinerville January 3, 1863. Near Germantown January 27. Near Yorkville January 28 (1 company). Tuscumbia, Alabama, February 22. Expedition to Colliersville and to LaFayette and Moscow March 8–16. Lafayette Depot March 15. Moscow March 16. Germantown April 1. Scout in Beaver Creek Swamp April 2–6. Moved to Corinth April 14–17.

Dodge's Expedition into northern Alabama April 15-May 8. Hock Cut, near Tuscumbia, April 22. Tuscumbia, Dickson Station, and Leighton April 23. Town Creek April 27.

Expedition from Burnsville to Tupelo, Mississippi, May 2–8. Tupelo May 5. At Corinth, Mississippi, May 8, 1863 to January 8, 1864.

Expedition to Florence May 26–31, 1863. Florence May 28. Hamburg Landing May 30. Iuka, Mississippi, July 9 and 14. Near Corinth August 16.

Expedition into western Tennessee August 27-October 1. Swallow Bluff September 30 (Companies A and C).

Operations in northern Mississippi and western Tennessee against Chalmers October 4–17. Ingraham's Mills, near Byhalia, October 12. Wyatts, Tallahatchie River, October 13. Operations on Memphis & Charleston Railroad November 3–5. Operations on Memphis & Charleston Railroad against Lee's attack November 28-December 10. Molino November 28. Ripley December 1 and 4. Jack's Creek December 24.

Moved to Memphis, Tennessee, January 18, 1864. Veterans on furlough February 4-March 4; then moved to St. Louis, Missouri, March 12. Moved to Memphis June 6. Near Memphis May 2 (detachment). LaFayette June 9.

Smith's Expedition to Tupelo, Mississippi, July 5–18. King's Creek July 9. Pontotoc July 11–12. Tupelo July 13–14. Oldtown Creek July 15. Ellistown July 16. Tupelo July 25.

Smith's Expedition to Oxford, Miss., August 1–30. Tallahatchie River August 7–9. Hurricane Creek, Oxford, August 9. Hurricane Creek August 13, 14, 16 and 19. Moved to St. Louis, Missouri, arriving September 17.

Pursuit of Price through Missouri September 30-November 26. Little Blue October 21. Independence October 22. Big Blue and State Line, Westport, October 23. Mine Creek, Little Osage River, October 25. Duty by detachments in St. Louis District until July 18, 1865. Moselle Bridge, near Franklin, December 7, 1864 (Company E).

Expedition from Bloomfield into Dunklin County March 3–7, 1865. Skirmishes near Bloomfield March 3 and 7. Dunklin County March 4. Skirmish McKinzie's Creek, near Patterson, April 15, Ordered to Omaha, Nebraska, July 18; thence to Fort Kearney and duty there until September. Moved to Fort Leavenworth, Kansas, arriving September 14.

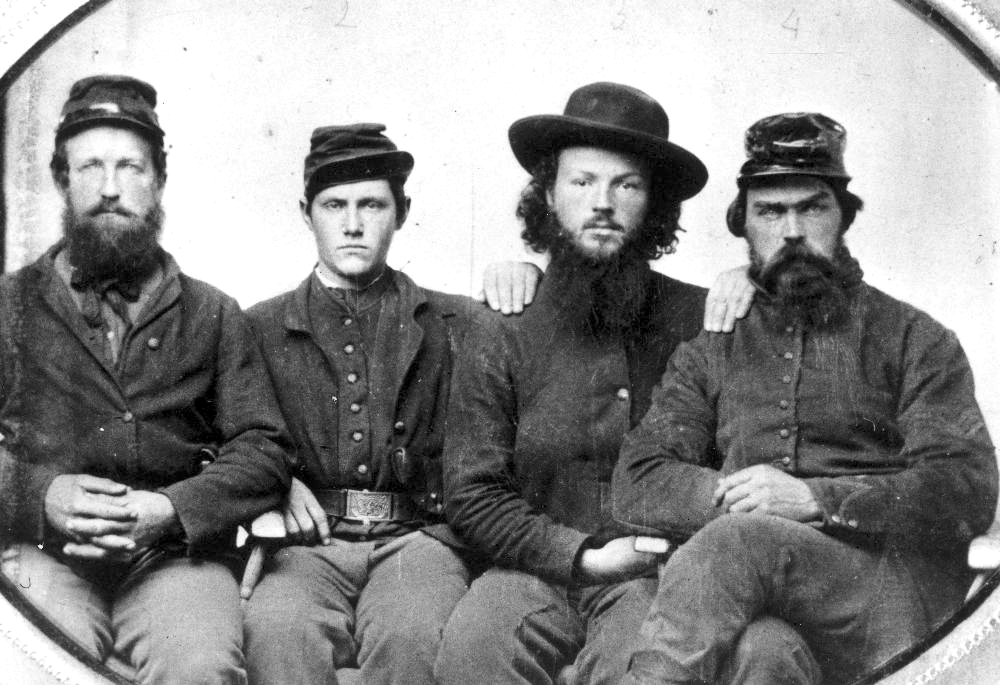
A tintype of Private Curtis P. Casey, Co. H; Private Dwight Chappell (Chappel), Co. F; Edgar Cove; and Sgt. George R. Ferris, Co. H, all members of the 7th Kansas Volunteer Cavalry, 1863, Kansas Historical Society

== Casualties ==
The regiment lost a total of 223 men during service; 3 officers and 55 enlisted men killed or mortally wounded, 1 officer and 164 enlisted men died of disease.

== Commanders ==
- Colonel Charles R. Jennison
- Colonel Albert Lindley Lee
- Colonel Thomas P. Herrick
- Lieutenant Colonel Daniel R. Anthony – arrested and relieved of command for issuing an order that prevented Tennessee slave catchers from entering the regiment's camp looking for escaped slaves

== Notable members ==
- Private William Frederick "Buffalo Bill" Cody, Company H – later scout and showman/entertainer
- Captain John Brown Jr., Company K – Son of abolitionist John Brown
- Captain Marshall Cleveland – served a few months before becoming an independent freebooter
- Captain Amos Hodgman, Company H – Namesake of Hodgeman County, Kansas, died near Oxford, Mississippi, of wounds from action in the Meridian Expedition, October 10, 1863.
- Corporal Noah Van Buren Kness, Company G – Namesake of Ness County, Kansas, killed at Abbeville, Mississippi, August 22, 1864.
- Major Edmund Needham Morrill – governor of Kansas (1895–1897)

== See also ==
- Jayhawker
- List of Kansas Civil War Units
- Kansas in the Civil War
