= Mary Stafford Anthony =

American suffragist (1827–1907)

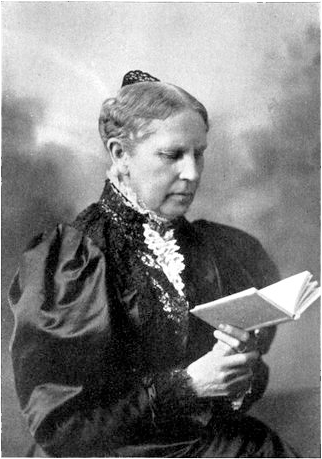
- Portrait of Mary S. Anthony appearing in The Life and Work of Susan B. Anthony
- Born: April 2, 1827; Battenville, New York
- Died: February 5, 1907 (aged 79); Rochester, New York
- Resting place: Mount Hope Cemetery, Rochester
- Relatives: Susan B. Anthony (sister); Daniel Read Anthony (brother); Daniel Read Anthony Jr. (nephew); Susan B. Anthony II (great-niece)

Mary Stafford Anthony (April 2, 1827 – February 5, 1907) was an American suffragist during the women's rights movement of the 19th century. Anthony was employed as a school teacher in Western New York, and was eventually promoted to the position of principal within the Rochester City School District, where she was the first woman known to receive equal pay with men in the same job.

She grew up in a Quaker family and became involved in several suffrage and other progressive organizations, such as the New York Women's Suffrage Association, the Women's Christian Temperance Union, and the National Woman Suffrage Association. Anthony founded the Women's Political Club, later renamed in 1880 as the Political Equality Club. She was the youngest surviving sister of Susan B. Anthony.

== Early life and education ==
Mary Stafford Anthony was born on April 2, 1827, in Battenville, New York. She was the youngest to survive of four sisters and two brothers. (Her younger sister Eliza Anthony was born in 1832 and died in 1834.) Their parents Daniel and Lucy Read Anthony had different religious backgrounds. He was a liberal Quaker and she was a Baptist; the children were raised as Quakers. The Anthony family and other families in the area were engaged in the American Friends Society's activities. The family worked together to keep up their spirits, for instance, after first moving to their farmhouse with their parents near Rochester.,

The Anthony family followed the Quaker traditions, where "men and women were partners in church and at home, hard physical work was respected, help for the needy and unfortunate was spontaneous, and education was important for both boys and girls". Quakers not only encouraged, but demanded education for both boys and girls. For the rest of her life, Anthony supported education for girls.

== Career ==
Anthony worked as a teacher and principal, had her own home, and served as a women's rights activist. She tackled projects fiercely and measured her success by learning to understand the deficiencies that blocked women from achieving their highest potential—attaining suffrage.

In 1844, at the age of seventeen, Anthony started working as a teacher, receiving a salary of $1.50 per week. She taught for one year until her family moved to a small farm in Gates, New York, near Rochester. Here she helped her parents with the farm and household chores.

In her free time, Anthony studied. At the age of twenty-seven, she returned to teaching, taking a position in Rochester. She taught in the city of Rochester's public schools for 27 years, being promoted to principal. She was the first woman known in Rochester to receive equal pay to men who were principals. She retired from her position as principal of School No. 2 in 1883. Before 1859, the job description for a school principal involved unification of the school program, equal opportunity offered to all districts of the city, and securing improvements.

== Public service ==
Anthony was active in several women's organizations, which rapidly developed in the late 19th century. As a young woman, she attended the Rochester Women's Rights Convention of 1848 with her parents; it was held at the Unitarian Church in Rochester, New York. She and her parents each signed the Declaration of Sentiments.

Years later, Anthony joined Susan in challenges to promote women's suffrage. In 1872 they and fourteen other women were arrested for voting illegally in Rochester; there was no provision for women to vote. The court prosecuted only Susan Anthony, considering her to be the leader of the group. Although Mary Anthony was indicted, she was allowed to provide a recognizance (promise to the court) to refrain from such illegal action in the future. Her case did not go to trial.

Anthony joined the Women's Christian Temperance Union in 1873, working to aid women and families, by reducing the toll of drinking and alcoholism. The temperance union gained more than 200,000 members in the 1880s, built a national grassroots organization, and established local alliances with state politicians. It also came to support women's suffrage and effectively used its existing network to create political pressure on legislators.

In 1893, Anthony became corresponding secretary of the New York State Woman Suffrage Association. From home, she and others tackled voting policies. They helped gain passage of the state law in 1918 law that allowed women to vote in some New York state and local elections.

In 1885, Anthony organized and hosted the first meeting of the local Women's Political Club. She served as its president for more than a decade, from 1892 to 1903. Her initiative helped develop a woman's club working for women's rights. The club's leadership also pushed to open admissions at the University of Rochester to women. In 1893 it worked to collect suffrage petitions from residents to submit to the state constitutional convention. "A herculean task was undertaken in 1893-a canvass of the city for suffrage petitions to the state constitutional convention then about to meet at Albany". Anthony accumulated more in number of petitions from women and men than votes by almost twenty five percent, a record not matched elsewhere in the state.

Mary Anthony also donated funds to her sister Susan to help in their goals. In 1900, Anthony gave Susan $2,000 to assist the University of Rochester to enable admission of women as students.

On June 3, 1904, at the Second Conference of the International Woman Suffrage Alliance at the Hotel Prinz Albrecht in Berlin, Germany, Miss Mary S. Anthony was unanimously approved as the second member of the newly named organization. Her sister, Susan B. Anthony was declared its first member at the same meeting.

The results of their work culminated with the ratification of the Nineteenth Amendment giving women the right to vote in the United States; women first voted in national elections in 1920.

== Personal life ==
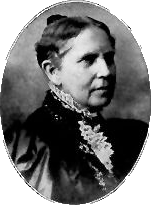
Portrait of Mary S. Anthony from The History of Woman Suffrage

Anthony never married. Her letters to family and friends were filled with practical observations and references, for instance about cooking a family recipe called Higdom, which included many vegetables from her garden. After vacations, she was determined to "go right to work", but only after the housekeeper organized her study. She had no trouble removing "her under rigging", when the weather turned hot.

Anthony sometimes commented about different cultures around the world. After meeting two women from China and observing their cultural practice of foot binding, she wrote, "Even to the unbinding of the feet that they may be natural in size, even at the risk of failing to get a lover and husband on account of her large feet". Anthony believed that her own sacrifices for women's suffrage were natural in practice, but always risked being seen as failing by men. She thought they did not understand that women needed to make great demands to achieve full citizenship.

Anthony was a homeowner and taxpayer. She believed that women should not have to support a government that did not allow them representation; she wrote this message directly on her checks to pay taxes. For ten years, she wrote that her taxes were "Paid under protest".

Anthony wrote to the county treasurer about women's suffrage. She said, "A minor may live to become of age, the illiterate to be educated, the lunatic to regain his reason, the idiot to become intelligent--when each and all can help to decide what shall enforce them; but the women, never". She continued with protests "to a Government that allows its women to be thus treated".

On October 9, 1906, she informed her cousin Jessie that "all monies are to go to the suffrage cause". Anthony wrote: "To me, the beauty of it all consists in the order," that is, citizenship rights, educational rights, and vocal rights for women in marriage equality, divorce proceedings, payment for work, choice of profession, and possible freedom from the domestic sphere. Without these, she believed that women were painfully bound by society.

Anthony died at her home on February 5, 1907 at age 79 from leukemia. She is buried at the historic Mount Hope Cemetery in Rochester, New York, next to her sister Susan.
