= List of mayors of Leavenworth, Kansas =

Leavenworth, Kansas mayors

The following is a list of mayors of the city of Leavenworth, Kansas, United States of America.

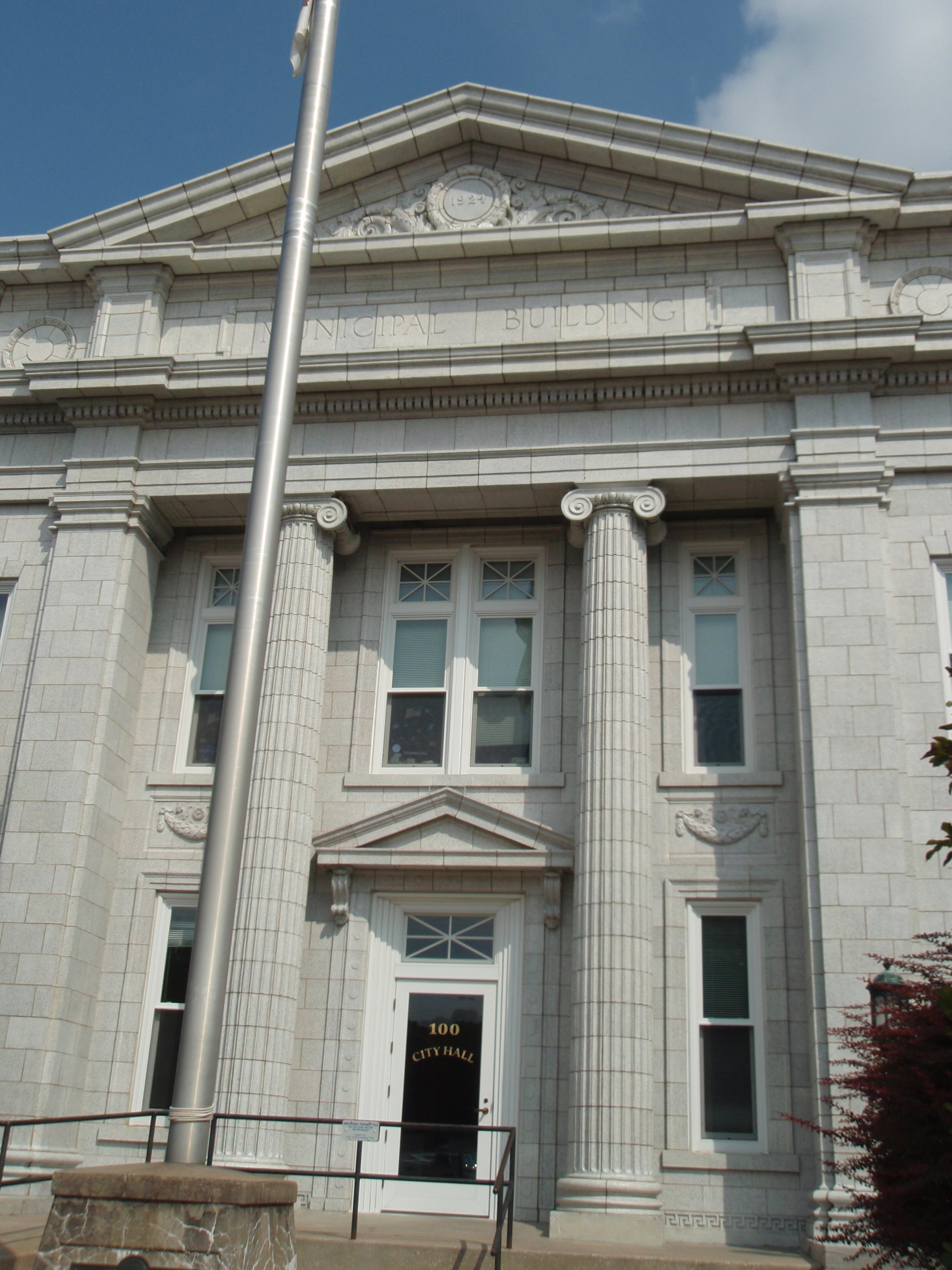
Leavenworth City Hall building in Kansas, 2009

- Thomas Slocum, 1855
- William E. Murphy, 1856
- Henry Joseph Adams, c.1857
- H.B. Denman, 1858-1859, 1862
- Jas. L. McDowell, 1860, 1864
- Warren Lattin, 1861
- Daniel Read Anthony, 1863, 1872-1873
- Thomas A. Carney, 1865-1866
- John Adams Acoming Halderman, 1867, 1870-1871
- C.R. Morehead Jr., 1868-1869
- J.L. Abernathy, 1874-1876
- Geo. Ummethum, 1877-1878
- W.M. Fortescue, 1879-1882
- S.F. Neely, 1881-1888, 1899-1900
- M. L. Hacker, 1889-1892
- Sam Dodsworth, 1893-1894
- D.A. Hook, 1895-1896
- John D. Edmond, 1897-1898
- Jeptha D. Ryan, 1901-1902
- Daniel R. Anthony Jr., 1903-1904
- Peter Everhardy, 1904-1908
- Omar Abernathy, c.1909-1911
- Albert Dodge, 1911-1912
- E. W. Crancer, c.1913-1916
- James C. Davis, c.1917-1921
- J. H. Miller, c.1935-1937
- Martin J. Eggert
- Charles “Doc” Rainsford Jennison
- Ted L. Sexton, c.1952-1955
- Ed Reilly, c.1956
- Benjamin Day, c.1972-1978
- Kenneth R. Bower, c.2000
- Larry Dedeke, c.2002, 2010-2012
- Shay Baker, c.2009
- Lisa Weakley, c.2015
- Nancy Bauder, c.2017
- Jermaine Wilson, c.2019, 2022-2023
- Myron Griswold, c.2020
- Camalla Leonhard, c.2022
- Edd Hingula, 2022
- Griff Martin, c.2024

== See also ==
- Leavenworth history
- List of first African-American mayors
