= David Loeb Weiss =

American film director

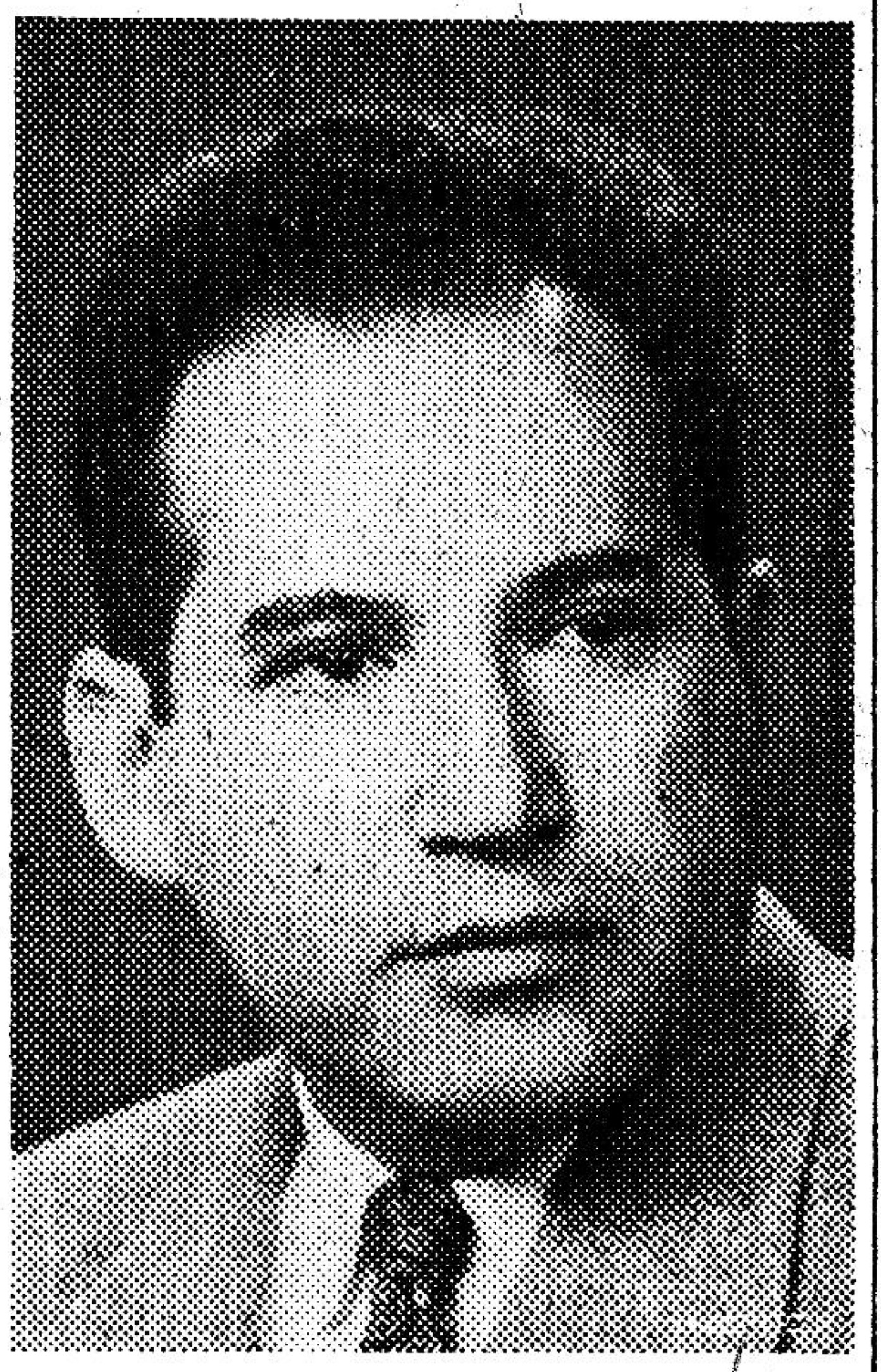

David Loeb Weiss (c. 1911 – August 11, 2005) was a Polish-born American socialist activist, filmmaker, and co-founder of the Socialist Workers Party in 1938.

== Early life ==
David Loeb Weiss was born in Warsaw, Poland in either 1911 or 1912. Loeb Weiss' father was a Yiddish actor in Poland. Loeb Weiss' mother was a garment worker. In his youth Loeb Weiss received a scholarship from the National Academy of Design and a scholarship with the Arts Institute of Architecture and Sculpture. During World War II, Loeb Weiss worked as a radar man in the United States Army. As a worker, Loeb Weiss held a variety of jobs throughout his life including: merchant marine, restaurant waiter, farmhand, shipyard worker, busboy, electrician, and New York Times proofreader. Many of his work experiences centered around labor organizing and striking, including as a leader during the Dura Steel strike in Los Angeles.

== Activism ==
David Loeb Weiss was a founding member of the Socialist Workers Party. David Loeb Weiss was the brother of socialist activist Murry Weiss.

As a military veteran, Loeb Weiss frequently spoke at socialist events and gatherings: on October 6, 1946, in Lynn, Massachusetts, to deliver, "The Veteran Today—Promises and Realities,"; and, on May 5, 1951, in Boston to present, "Is America Heading Toward War or Peace?".

In the late-1940s, Loeb Weiss was co-director of educational programs at Mountain Spring Camp, “a new vacation school and resort for workers and their families,” near the foothills of the Poconos in New Jersey. Sharing duties as Educational Director with William Warde in the late-1940s, Loeb Weiss also gave lectures at the New York Marxist Labor School, located at 116 University Place (eg. “Democracy, Fascism, and Socialism”). As late as 1956, Loeb Weiss was still giving educational lectures at Mountain Spring Camp (eg. “Socialism and the State”).

=== Confronting Jim Crow ===
The Freeport, New York Police Department shooting deaths of innocent African American U.S. military veterans Charles and Alfonso Ferguson on the night of February 5, 1946 (popularized by Woody Guthrie's song, "The Killing of the Ferguson Brothers,") prompted public denunciations of law enforcement authorities by Loeb Weiss. In The Militant, Loeb Weiss denounced the resulting public investigations after New York Governor Thomas Dewey appointed a “disinterested stooge” to look into incidents of refusal of service for (and subsequent murder of) several returning black war veterans. Weiss, a U.S. military veteran like the slain Ferguson brothers, stated: "They lied to us. All their promises were lies, lies, lies! In every country, especially, in our country, veterans, minorities and workers are shot down, discriminated against, insulted, scorned and abused every day in the week! We must learn how to fight. We must unite to fight against discrimination as we fought together on the picket lines and in the- foxholes. We must destroy the roots of discrimination—the capitalist system that breeds Jim Crowism!"

Unsuccessful as a mayoral candidate in 1953, Loeb Weiss advocated for investigation of Jim Crow practices in the New York City public school system. New York City Board of Education President Arthur Levitt claimed Jim Crow did not exist in New York City, despite admitting the fact that segregated schooling existed in segregated housing parts of Brooklyn and Harlem, stating: "the schooling in these sections is as good as anywhere else in the city." In The Militant, Loeb Weiss countered: "What is this but a Northern version of the hypocritical claim of 'separate but equal' by which Talmadge, Byrnes, and other white supremacists in the South cover up their discriminatory treatment of Negroes. Segregation always means discrimination."

== Campaigns as Political Candidate ==
At 41 years of age, David Loeb Weiss was the mayoral candidate on the ballot for the Socialist Workers Party on November 3, 1953. At that time Loeb Weiss was an “electrical worker who studied at New York University.” Loeb Weiss received 2,054 votes (0.09%) in the 1953 New York City mayoral election. After his failed 1953 mayoral campaign, Loeb Weiss wrote many articles for the SWP’s The Militant, which was then-edited by his brother Murry Weiss. A photo of Loeb Weiss accompanies his October, 1954 article, "WILL H-BOMB DOOM U.S.? Socialism Is Only Way Out from Atomic War."

In the 1954 New York State election, David Loeb Weiss (then, still an electrical worker) was the Socialist Workers Party candidate for Governor of New York, garnering 2,617 votes. In an October 4, 1954, campaign editorial for The Militant, Loeb Weiss wrote: "If American Big Business in its drive to control the world for private profit sets off an atomic war, the human species may perish. [...] We can put a stop to it. We can end their scheme of world murder. Socialism, with its planned non-profit, cooperative economic system, alone can save us from H-bomb doom. We are in a race between socialism and annihilation."

== Education ==
David Loeb Weiss received a B.A. in economics from New York University and an M.A. in political science from the New School for Social Research. As a qualifying employee, the New York Times paid tuition costs for Loeb Weiss to complete his undergraduate degree. While completing his B.A. in economics in the mid-1960s, Loeb Weiss attended classes at New York University's film school, where he was a student of Shirley Clarke, Haig Manoogian, Michael Wadleigh, and John Binder.

== Filmmaking career ==
David Loeb Weiss produced and directed several short and feature-length documentary films in his later life. After graduating from New York University, Loeb Weiss worked briefly as a film editor at the United Nations. In 1973 Loeb Weiss was a John Simon Guggenheim Fellow in Film.

=== Profile of a Peace Parade (1967) ===
Profile of a Peace Parade was filmed on August 6, 1966, the anniversary of the 1945 atomic bomb drop on Hiroshima. According to the New York Times, "six cameras were used to capture the mood of thousands of marchers converging on Times Square. The film covers the march as it proceeds to a mass rally on Park Avenue and 48th Street, near the offices of Dow Chemical and other producers of napalm and defoliants."

According to audio recordings from the 1968 Flaherty Film Seminar (where Weiss screened his documentary, No Vietnamese Ever Called Me Nigger), his first short film Profile of a Peace Parade was awarded the 'absolute grand prize' (the "Golden Marzocco") at the Festival dei Popoli, a festival of ethnographic and sociological films held in Florence.

Loeb Weiss spoke about the production of Profile of a Peace Parade in a 1994 German-language publication, stating: “No Vietnamese was 1968 and the film before that I started to film in 1967. That was called Profile of a Peace Parade, a parade that took place on the Hiroshima day, a protest against the atom bombing of Hiroshima and Nagasaki. Both of these instances I had no money. I was able, however, to get volunteers, prize-winning students, cinema teachers, some who worked in the industry. I was able to get equipment from the school, very little from the school, mostly from people who are in the industry where they “borrowed” the equipment over the weekend when it wasn't being used.”

The prize from the Florence-based Festival del Popoli for Profile of a Peace Parade was raw film stock, which Loeb Weiss used to shoot his next project, No Vietnamese Ever Called Me Nigger.

=== No Vietnamese Ever Called Me Nigger (1968) ===
Loeb Weiss completed No Vietnamese Ever Called Me Nigger in 1968. The film was produced and distributed by Paradigm Films. A promotional poster for the film was designed by Milton Glaser. The film won first prize at the Mannheim Film Festival.

In an interview about the making of the film, Loeb Weiss stated: "I made the film because of my very strong feelings and seeing this stuff on television where the truth was told sometimes only because it was most spectacular to get a large audience, and so on. But the basic truth was missing. So that's why I made it. I didn't wanna be a spokesman for the black people, I made No Vietnamese for the black people to be their own spokesmen."

In 2018 Anthology Film Archives and the National Museum of African American History and Culture preserved the film.

=== 'Ey Michelangelo (1971) ===
David Loeb Weiss and Philip F. Messina co-wrote an original screenplay for an unfinished film, with U.S. copyright registered as DU81289 on September 10, 1971.

=== To Make a Revolution (1972) ===
David Loeb Weiss completed a short documentary called To Make a Revolution about the Young Socialist Alliance (YSA), a revolutionary Marxist youth group closely allied to the Trotskyist Socialist Workers Party. The film depicts the December 1970 YSA convention held in New York City and the massive 500,000 person protest against the war in Vietnam held in Washington, D.C., on April 24, 1971 (including footage of the speech given by SWP member Andrew Pulley). An article in the YSA's bi-weekly publication, The Organizer, describes the film's theme as, "the YSA's response to Hoover's attacks on the growing mass movements and the YSA."

The film was intended as an "excellent recruitment tool" abetting "real possibilities for making money" through paid public admission to see the film and a speaker at YSA events. The film was originally intended to be fifteen minutes in length, however over nine hours of footage was shot and the final work was expanded to a 40 minute final duration.

The film was slated to have its premiere at the Socialist Activists and Educational Conference at Oberlin College, August 8–15, 1971 and was subsequently screened on January 1, 1972, during a national convention of the Young Socialist Alliance held in Houston, Texas.

Socialist film critic Marty Jonas dismissed the film as having, "no enthusiasm, no vitality, no conflict, [...] no tautness, no tension, no unity..." and added that: "Clearly what matters to the YSA is not the construction of a Marxist leadership to bring the working class to power. What matters is that there is a section in the film of women's libbers rapping, which the feminists will love; a section of Black nationalists rapping, which the nationalists will love; and a section of Peter Camejo rapping which every radical will love. It's done with that heavy and patronizing hand."

=== Farewell, Etaoin Shrdlu (1980) ===
Loeb Weiss' 1980 half-hour documentary Farewell, Etaoin Shrdlu documents the transition of the New York Times from a traditional Linotype layout and printing process to a computer-based workflow in 1978. Carl Schlesinger, a veteran typesetter at the Times, narrates the documentary and appears throughout the film. David Loeb Weiss worked as a proofreader at the New York Times for 18 years.

Among the 1981 accolades awarded to Farewell, Etaoin Shrdlu were: the Blue Ribbon in the Technology division of the American Film Festival, the Creative Excellence Award from the Industrial Film Festival, and the CINE Golden Eagle.

== See also ==
- Shirley Clarke
