= William Sloan Tough =

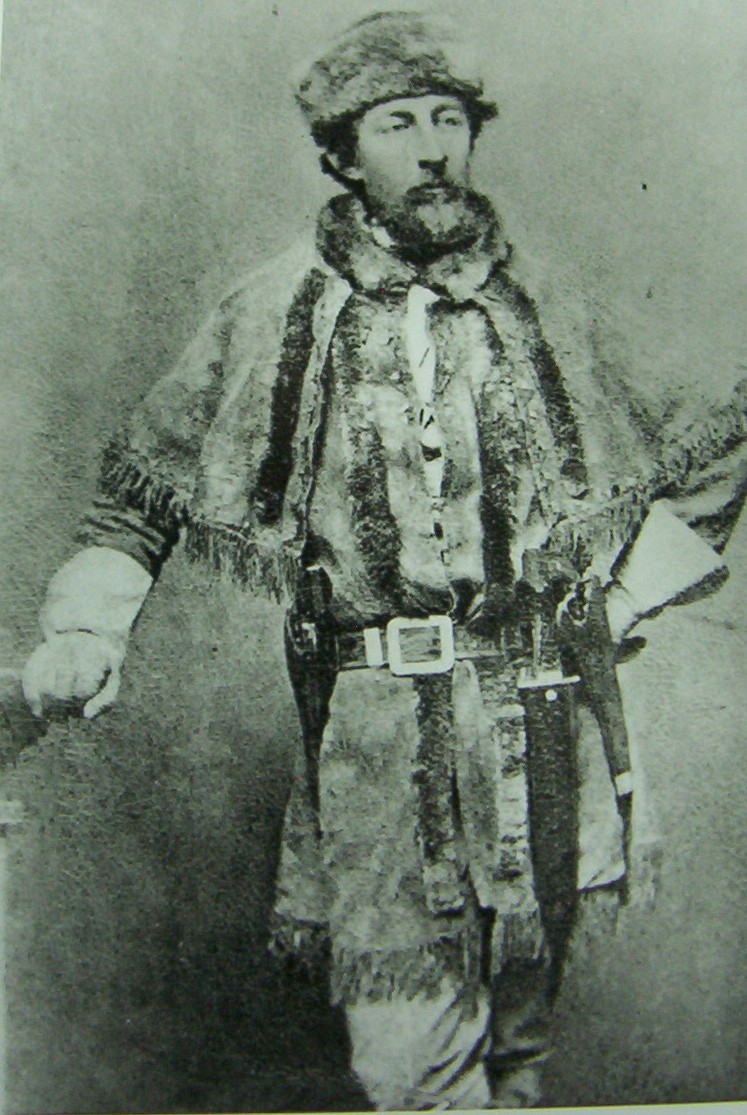
William Sloan Tough

William Sloan Tough aka "Captain Tough", "Tufts" or "Tuff" (May 19, 1840 – May 24, 1904) was an American guerrilla fighter who served with the Kansas Red Legs which fought on the Kansas-Missouri Border during the American Civil War in support of the Union. Born in Maryland, he moved to Missouri as a young man and joined the Red Legs before the Civil War. After the war, he married and opened a livery stable. He was also appointed a United States Marshall and was elected to the Kansas House of Representatives. He later fell ill and died in 1904.

== Early life ==
William Sloan Tough was born on May 19, 1840, in Baltimore, Maryland, and at the age of 19 he settled in St. Joseph, Missouri. He journeyed to Colorado during the Pike's Peak Gold Rush but returned to Missouri when his prospecting activity was unsuccessful. Tough is also credited as being a pony express rider and some reports list him as engaging in horse trading before the American Civil War in 1861.

== Civil War years ==
Tough joined the "Red Legs" guerrilla forces fighting on the Kansas-Missouri Border leading up to the Civil War. He became a civilian scout for the Union Army serving as chief of scouts for General James G. Blunt as part of the Army of the Frontier. The group of scouts he led were called the "Buckskin Scouts" and this group included former members of the "Red Legs". One of the scouts working under Tough during this time was sixteen year old William Frederick Cody who would later become known as Buffalo Bill.

On July 23, 1863, while at Fort Scott, Kansas, Tough was involved in a disagreement with a Union cavalry soldier named William Gardner. It was reported that Gardner had followed Tough after the initial dispute and Tough shot Gardner killing him. Tough was arrested for the act but was released following an investigation. On another occasion Tough was part of a small group of survivors following an attack by Quantrill's Raiders on a military column that he was with.

== Later life ==
Following the Civil War, Tough married and settled with his wife at Leavenworth, Kansas, and began operating a livery stable. He was appointed a United States Marshall for Kansas on March 23, 1873, and held the position until some time in 1876. During this time period he was also elected to the Kansas House of Representatives from the Leavenworth district. Tough then returned to horse trading operating his business at the Kansas City Stockyards and it was reported that he sold a number of animals that were used during the Boer War.

William Sloan Tough died on May 24, 1904, in Kansas City, Missouri, following a long illness.

== See also ==
- Bleeding Kansas
- Quantrill's Raiders
