= Susan B. Anthony II =

American journalist, activist, and substance abuse counselor

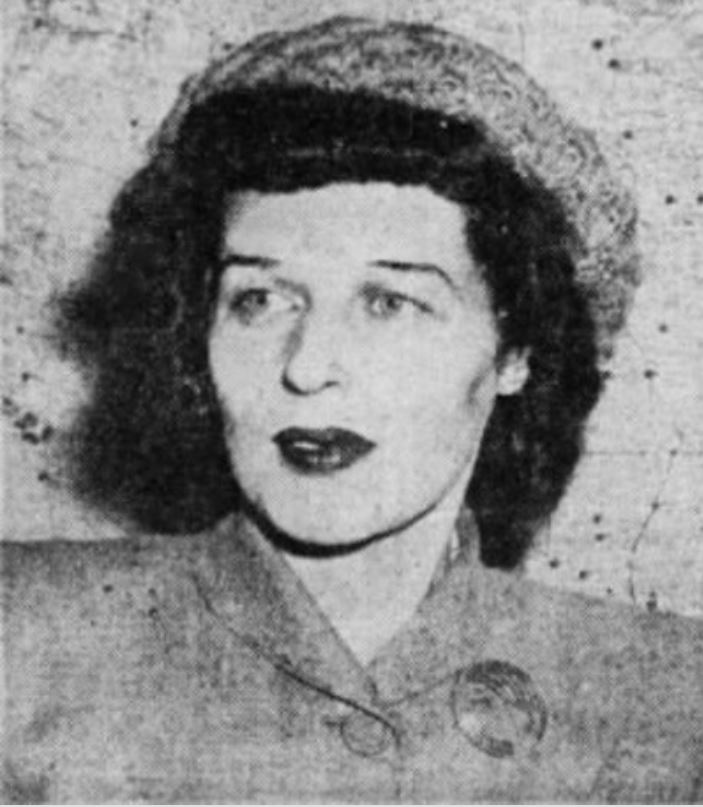
- Anthony in 1949
- Born: Susan Brownell Anthony II; July 26, 1916; Easton, Pennsylvania, U.S.
- Died: July 8, 1991 (aged 74); Boca Raton, Florida, U.S.
- Other names: Susan Lewis, Susan McAvoy
- Citizenship: United States; United Kingdom
- Education: University of Rochester (BA); American University (MA); Saint Mary's College (PhD)
- Occupations: writer, journalist, educator, substance abuse counselor, activist
- Political party: Democrat
- Spouse: Henry Hill Collins, Jr. (m. 1940; div. 1948) Clifford Thomas McAvoy (m. 1949; div. 1951) Aubrey John Lewis (m. 1954; div. 1960)
- Relatives: Susan B. Anthony (great-aunt); Daniel Read Anthony (great-uncle); Mary Stafford Anthony (great-aunt)

Susan Brownell Anthony II (July 26, 1916 – July 8, 1991) was an American journalist and writer, activist and substance abuse counselor. She grew up in Easton, Pennsylvania, and attended the University of Rochester, graduating in 1938. During her schooling, she became an activist in progressive causes, but she also struggled with alcoholism. She supported pacifism, the anti-fascist movement, housing desegregation, and women's rights, including advocacy to remove the poll tax as an obstacle to women's suffrage, as well as childcare centers for working mothers. She worked as a reporter for The Washington Star and completed a master's degree in political science in 1941 at American University.

In the 1940s, Anthony began publishing books on women's issues and hosted a women's radio program in New York City. She joined Alcoholics Anonymous and gained her sobriety. In 1949, she hosted a program in Boston for WORL designed to educate people about alcoholism and its treatment as a disease. Moving to Florida in the early 1950s, she worked as a journalist at the Key West Citizen, but her relationship with liberal causes and activists brought her to the attention of the House Un-American Activities Committee. To avoid testifying, she took British citizenship, as her husband was a British planter living in Jamaica. While living on the island, she worked as a journalist for The Gleaner.

When Anthony divorced in 1960 and tried to move back to the United States, she was threatened with deportation by officials who claimed she had renounced her US citizenship. After a nine-year battle, during which she earned a PhD in theology and began teaching in Florida, her citizenship was restored. Traveling throughout the US, Anthony lectured on women's rights issues and sobriety. In 1975, she co-founded the Wayside House in Delray Beach, Florida, to assist other women in maintaining their sobriety. She was honored for her work with alcoholics by the US Senate Committee on Alcoholism and Drugs. She continued publishing books, including her autobiography, through the 1980s. Anthony died from bone cancer in 1991, donating her papers to the University of Rochester.

== Early life ==
Susan Brownell Anthony II was born on July 26, 1916, in Easton, Pennsylvania, to Charlotte (née Sutherland) and Luther Burt Anthony. Her father had moved to Easton in 1898 to work as a drama coach at Lafayette College and was known for his work as a playwright and drama critic. Unable to make a living writing plays and acting, he worked as a district manager for Dun & Bradstreet for 30 years and then in civil service until his retirement. Her mother, who had been born in Jamaica, was a writer and lecturer. Her paternal grandfather was Jacob Merritt Anthony, youngest brother of the suffragist Susan B. Anthony.

Anthony grew up in Easton on College Hill, summering at the family cottage in Raubsville. She graduated magna cum laude in 1938 with a political science degree from the University of Rochester on a scholarship named after her great-aunt and namesake. As a result of a weight problem and low self-esteem, she began drinking at university. Simultaneously, she became involved in social causes like racial justice, fighting poverty and the peace movement. She lobbied for the arms embargo against the Spanish Republic to be lifted so that they could fight against fascism. She also joined the National Negro Congress, pressing for civil rights for blacks.

== Career ==
=== Early career (1938–1948) ===
Anthony began her career in the Washington, D.C. office of the National Youth Administration in 1938. The following year, she joined the staff of The Washington Star and began writing articles on migrants' and women's issues for periodicals such as The Christian Science Monitor and The New York Times Magazine. In 1940, she married Henry Hill Collins, Jr., an economist working at the Department of Labor. That year, she read In Women's Defense, a treatise evaluating the socio-economic systems that ensnared women, written by Communist Party member Mary Inman. The book had a profound impact on Anthony and intensified her commitment to work on women's issues. In 1941, she completed a master's degree in political science at American University. The following year, she took part in hearings on the bill sponsored by Florida Senator Claude Pepper proposing national legislation to abolish poll taxes. Along with other activists including Virginia Durr and Lucy Randolph Mason, she supported the women's poll tax repeal movement. Though the Pepper bill was not successful, Anthony continued to support repeal of laws requiring poll taxes to vote and spoke on college campuses, such as Bryn Mawr, urging elimination of disenfranchisement statutes for several years.

While continuing to work as a journalist, Anthony published her first book, Out of the Kitchen—Into the War, in 1943. She left The Washington Star in 1944 and began working at the Washington Navy Yard, publishing the article "Working at the Navy Yard" in the May edition of The New Republic. Hired by the Ladies' Home Journal in 1944 to investigate the status of women as homemakers and workers, Anthony worked with Mildred Fairchild and Ann Wentworth Shyne of Bryn Mawr College to compile Women During the War and After, which was published by the U.S. Women's Bureau in 1945. Her views on women's rights were "a very modern feminist vision" encompassing the intersectionality of inequality based on class, color, and race. She saw housekeeping as a way of limiting women and keeping them in a traditional sphere. She encouraged women to take jobs outside the home and believed it would take women working with men to win the war.

In 1946, Anthony moved to New York City and hosted the radio program This Woman's World at WMCA. It was canceled after nine months and picked up by the station WLIB, but only ran for an additional month and a half. The show sought to give housewives an idea of the activities they could pursue outside of the home, a controversial topic at the time. Of this period in her life, Anthony said: "I had the nerve to go on the air every day with all these wonderful people like Margaret Sanger, like Mrs. Roosevelt, like Judy Holliday, you name them, they were on the show, and hiding my martini breath and my hangover because I had been closing the bars in Greenwich Village 'til four that morning, you see. And so finally this caught up with me and I knew I was going to die. That while I was trying to change the world and save the world, I was personally dying of starvation. I didn't know what the starvation was, but I knew that booze wasn't going to fill that starvation." She joined Alcoholics Anonymous and worked her way to recovery.

Just as the white race likes to raise its own prestige by detracting from and minimizing the abilities of the Negro race, so men in general like to build up their superiority by minimizing all women. ... This process begins in the home, and is nurtured by textbooks, press, movies, radio and theater. These prevalent attitudes result in giving women a sex inferiority complex, second only to the racial inferiority complex of many Negroes.

— Susan B. Anthony II, "Report of the Commission on the Status of Women", May 25, 1946.

Anthony became one of the founders of the Congress of American Women in 1946, and was among those who incorporated the organization in 1947. The congress was an official US branch of the Women's International Democratic Federation, an antifascist, pro-Soviet organization. The organization supported progressive policies giving women full rights and equality both in the home and economically. They supported labor organizing and civil rights and were against anticommunist attacks on liberals. Though many members were communists or part of the popular front, membership in the organization included a broad mix of liberal, middle-class women. Among them, besides Anthony, were Eleanor Flexner, Elizabeth Gurley Flynn, Mary van Kleeck, Cornelia Bryce Pinchot. In an era characterized by antifeminism, and two decades before the events of the Women's Liberation Movement and Civil Rights Movement of the 1960s, Anthony linked the fight against racism and sexism as similar struggles. She served as the Congress delegate to the United Nations Commission on the Status of Women in 1948 and continued actively in the organization until it folded in 1950.

=== Middle career (1948–1960) ===
Anthony and Collins divorced in 1948, and in February 1949, she married Clifford Thomas McAvoy, who was the New England Director of the Labor Committee of the Progressive Party. The couple moved to Boston, where Anthony began broadcasting You and Alcoholism, a program on WORL designed to educate people about alcoholism and its treatment as a disease. In 1951, she filed for divorce from McAvoy, took a job at the Key West Citizen, and moved to Florida. From 1949, Anthony had become the target of investigations by the House Un-American Activities Committee for her association with people who were suspected of being communist sympathizers, such as Ella Reeve Bloor and her husband Clifford McAvoy. By 1953, the investigations led to her being barred as a security risk from a local military base, at which her fiancé was stationed. Wanting to clear her name, she went to meet with the FBI and told them of her involvement in the pacifist movement and her support for Spanish loyalists, for housing desegregation, and for women's rights including childcare centers for working mothers. She denied that she had ever been a communist.

Returning to Florida, Anthony discovered her fiancé had been sent to Japan and was stationed at a base where no women were allowed. In 1954, she married Aubrey John Lewis, a British allspice plantation owner, who lived in Jamaica. She moved to the island and began working as a society reporter for The Gleaner. In December, she was subpoenaed to return to Washington, D.C. to testify before the Un-American Activities Committee. To avoid having to testify, she took out British citizenship, after being advised by her attorneys that her US citizenship would not be jeopardized. When she and Lewis divorced in 1960 and Anthony attempted to return home, she was advised that she had renounced her US citizenship. Threatened with deportation, she engaged in a nine-year battle to restore her nationality.

=== Later career (1960–1987) ===
While fighting to regain her citizenship, Anthony underwent a religious conversion and joined the Roman Catholic Church. She studied theology at Saint Mary's College in Notre Dame, Indiana, earning a PhD in 1965 as one of the first Catholic laywomen to attain a theology degree. Upon her graduation, Anthony moved to Boca Raton, Florida, where she taught theology at Marymount College between 1965 and 1969. Anthony supported the Women's Liberation Movement, but because of her legal situation, she curtailed her involvement in protests, focusing on lectures on women's rights. Once her citizenship had been restored, she traveled the country speaking on women's rights, substance abuse, and the power of prayer. In 1971, she published her autobiography, The Ghost in My Life, describing how she had come to terms with her aunt's legacy and her own search for a separate identity. In 1973, she became an addiction counselor at the South County Mental Health Center in Delray Beach and two years later co-founded the Wayside House, a residential treatment center for women who were chemically dependent, with Phyllis Michelfelder.

In 1976, Anthony was honored for her work with alcoholics by the US Senate Committee on Alcoholism and Drugs. That year, she attempted to join a convent, but after a few months, the novice mistress encouraged her to leave. She was invited to attend the 1977 National Women's Conference and endorsed the Equal Rights Amendment. She was the first member of the group Catholics Act for ERA which lobbied for ratification in the late 1970s and early 1980s. In 1979, she was invited to the White House to attend a reception hosted by First Lady Rosalynn Carter, upon the minting of the Susan B. Anthony dollar. Anthony continued to be active on the lecture circuit throughout the 1980s and took part in the Seneca Women's Encampment for a Future of Peace and Justice in 1983.

== Death and legacy ==
Though she lived in Deerfield Beach, Anthony died from bone cancer at Hospice-By-The-Sea in Boca Raton on July 8, 1991. Anthony and the feminists of her generation laid the groundwork for a robust feminist movement to re-emerge in the 1960s. The progressive ideology that they contributed between 1945 and 1956 was obscured by the impact of McCarthyism on the Old Left. Activists like Anthony were loath to identify themselves as either feminists or communists. In trying to navigate in an era wherein there was not a cohesive feminist movement, leftist women both pushed the progressive wing of the Communist Party to expand their ideas of women's challenges and rejected communist ideas that gender and racial oppression were outcroppings of class-based exploitation. Instead, they argued that sexism made it virtually impossible for women to change economic and social structures. Her papers form part of the special collections of River Campus Libraries at the University of Rochester.

== Selected works ==
- Anthony II, Susan Brownell (1943). Out of the Kitchen, Into the War: Woman's Winning Role in the Nation's Drama. New York, New York: Stephen Daye, Inc. OCLC 232415.
- Anthony II, Susan B. (May 1, 1944). "Working at the Navy Yard". The New Republic. Vol. 110, no. 18. Washington, D.C.: The New Republic Publishing Company. ISSN 0028-6583. Archived from the original on November 25, 2020.
- Fairchild, Mildred; Shyne, Ann W.; Anthony II, Susan B. (1945). Women During the War and After: Summary of a Comprehensive Study by the Carola Woerishoffer Graduate Department of Social Economy and Social Research, Bryn Mawr College. Philadelphia, Pennsylvania: Curtis Publishing Company. OCLC 6328670.
- Anthony II, Susan Brownell (1971). The Ghost in My Life. New York, New York: Chosen Books. OCLC 1149292239.
- Anthony II, Susan B. (1972). Survival Kit: A Richer Life through Medication, Interaction & Spiritual Regeneration. New York, New York: Signet Books. ISBN 978-0-451-05373-2.
- Anthony II, Susan Brownell (1987). Sidewalk Contemplatives: A Spirituality for Socially Concerned Christians. New York, New York: Crossroad Publishing Company. ISBN 978-0-8245-0795-4.
