= Charles R. Jennison =

Union Army officer and Kansas politician (1834–1884)

Charles Rainsford Jennison
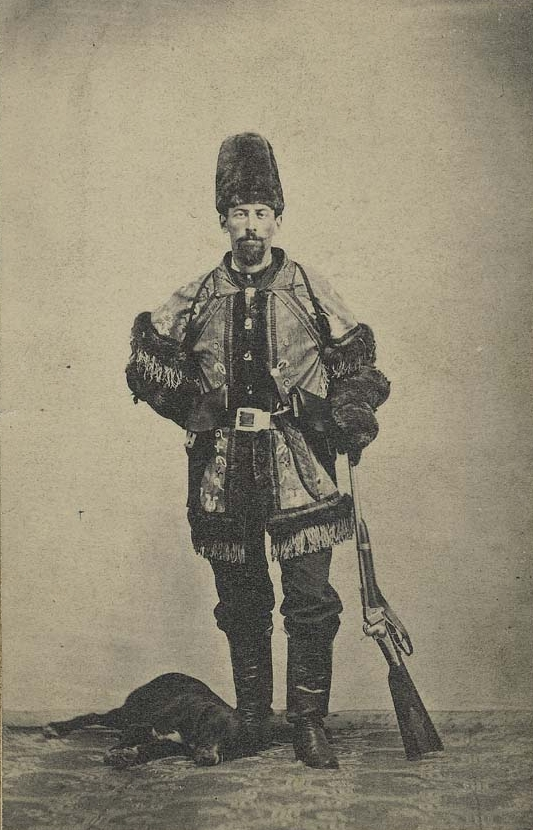
- Jennison, c. 1855-1860

Personal details
- Born: June 6, 1834 Antwerp, New York, U.S.
- Died: June 21, 1884 (aged 50) Leavenworth, Kansas, U.S.
- Party: Republican
- Nickname: "Doc"

Military service
- Allegiance: United States
- Years of service: 1861–1864
- Rank: Colonel
- Commands: Jennison's Jayhawkers (7th Kansas Volunteer Cavalry); 15th Kansas Volunteer Cavalry
- Battles/wars: Bleeding Kansas; American Civil War Second Battle of Lexington Battle of Little Blue River Battle of Westport

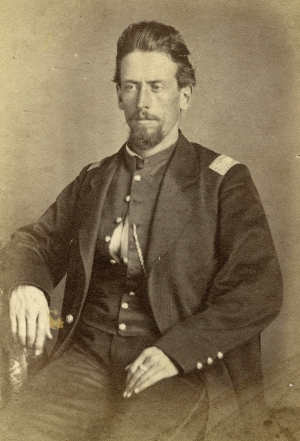
Jennison as a Union Army colonel during the American Civil War

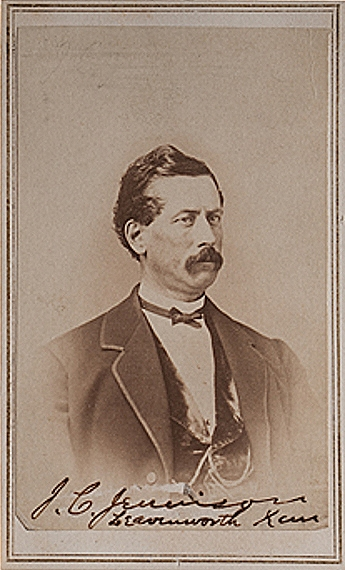
An illustration of Jennison following the end of the Civil War in 1865

Charles Rainsford Jennison also known as "Doc" Jennison (June 6, 1834 – June 21, 1884) was a member of the anti-slavery faction during Bleeding Kansas, a famous Jayhawker, and a member of the Kansas State Senate in the 1870s. He later served as a Union colonel and as a leader of Jayhawker militias during the American Civil War, until being dishonorably discharged for murder and robbery.

== Early life and education ==
Charles R. Jennison was born on June 6, 1834, in Antwerp, New York in Jefferson County. His family moved to Albany, Wisconsin in 1846, where Jennison studied medicine. At the age of 20, Jennison married. In 1858, he moved to Osawatomie, Kansas and to Mound City, Kansas, shortly thereafter. Jennison was considered the most brutal and unscrupulous of the jayhawkers.

== Career ==
=== Bleeding Kansas ===
While some other prominent leaders of irregulars in the Bleeding Kansas border conflict shared these traits, Jennison was distinguished by his blatant plunder for personal gain. Jennison cooperated with James Montgomery in opposing pro-slavery settlers and irregulars believed to be in league with Border Ruffians. In command of nine men, Jennison "tried" and hanged Russell Hinds near the state line at Mine Creek for the offense of helping to return a fugitive slave to his master in Missouri. Returning a slave was not only legal, but required at the time under the Fugitive Slave Act. Hinds had rejected the standard $25 reward ($515 in 2005 dollars), but did accept $5 reimbursement for his expenses in transporting the slave, who had agreed to return to his master while awaiting legal emancipation. The acceptance of the reimbursement was enough to convince Jennison to hand down a death sentence.

=== Civil War ===
Prior to the outbreak of the American Civil War, Jennison became a captain of the Mound City Guards on February 19, 1861. Although not with Senator James H. Lane's Kansas brigade during the Sacking of Osceola, Jennison was associated with it and would soon join the fray after receiving a commission as colonel from Kansas Governor Charles L. Robinson on September 4.

On October 28, 1861, Jennison completed the organization and mustering of his 7th Kansas Cavalry. The regiment would become known as "Jennison's Jayhawkers." It immediately took to the field patrolling the Kansas-Missouri border to prevent the secessionist under Sterling Price from crossing. Jennisons was a resolute abolitionist; his sentiments on the matter were the subject of an article in Horace Greeley's New York Daily Tribune. The article reported Jennison as refusing to allow non-abolitionist soldiers to serve under his command, and asserting that "the slaves of [southerners] can always find a protection in... [my] camp, and they will be defended to the last man and bullet."

While the regiment was at Leavenworth, Kansas, in April 1862, Jennison, angered over James G. Blunt being named brigadier general in his stead, resigned from the army and turned to banditry as a Redleg.

Following the Lawrence Massacre Jennison was once again commissioned a colonel and called into service by Kansas Governor Thomas Carney. Jennison raised a regiment that would become the 15th Kansas Cavalry on October 17, 1863.

In a particularly egregious incident late in the war, Jennison shot and killed 66 year old civilian David Gregg "on the public highway north of Parkville [sic], Platte Co. Mo." on September 15, 1864.

Colonel Jennison commanded a mixed brigade of Kansas militia and volunteers resisting Price's Raid in October 1864. However, in December he was arrested as the result of plundering while returning through Missouri after the pursuit of Price. Jennison was court-martialled and convicted on June 23, 1865, whereupon he was dishonorably dismissed from the service.

=== Postwar ===
Jennison was elected to the Kansas Legislature from Leavenworth County in 1865, reelected in 1867, and elected to the Kansas State Senate in 1872.

== Death ==
Jennison died at Leavenworth, Kansas on June 21, 1884 at age 50.
