= Leavenworth Times =

Newspaper in Leavenworth, Kansas

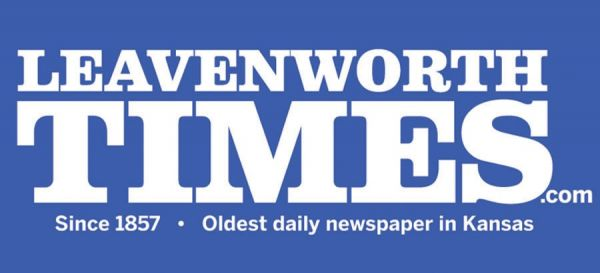
- Type: Daily newspaper
- Owner: CherryRoad Media
- Founded: 1856
- Headquarters: 422 Seneca Street, Leavenworth, Kansas 66048, United States
- Circulation: 3,041
- Website: LeavenworthTimes.com

Leavenworth Times is an American daily newspaper published in Leavenworth, Kansas. The newspaper is owned by CherryRoad Media.

== History ==
Founded in 1856 by future United States Senator Robert Crozier, the Times claims to be the oldest daily newspaper in Kansas. Daniel R. Anthony, brother of Susan B. Anthony, bought the paper in 1871 and the paper remained in the Anthony family until the 1960s, even after Daniel Anthony shot and killed rival publisher R.C. Satterlee of the Kansas Herald, in 1871 (he was acquitted at trial), and then was shot himself by rival editor William Embry of the Daily Appeal in 1875 (he survived).

In 1966, The Thomson Corporation bought the Leavenworth Times, selling it in 1995 to American Publishing Company (later Hollinger International). During Hollinger's divestment of most of its small papers, Liberty Publishing (later called GateHouse Media) bought the Times in 1999. The company later merged with Gannett, who sold the paper in 2021 to CherryRoad Media.

== See also ==
- List of newspapers in Kansas
