= Clifford T. McAvoy =

American politician (1904–1957)

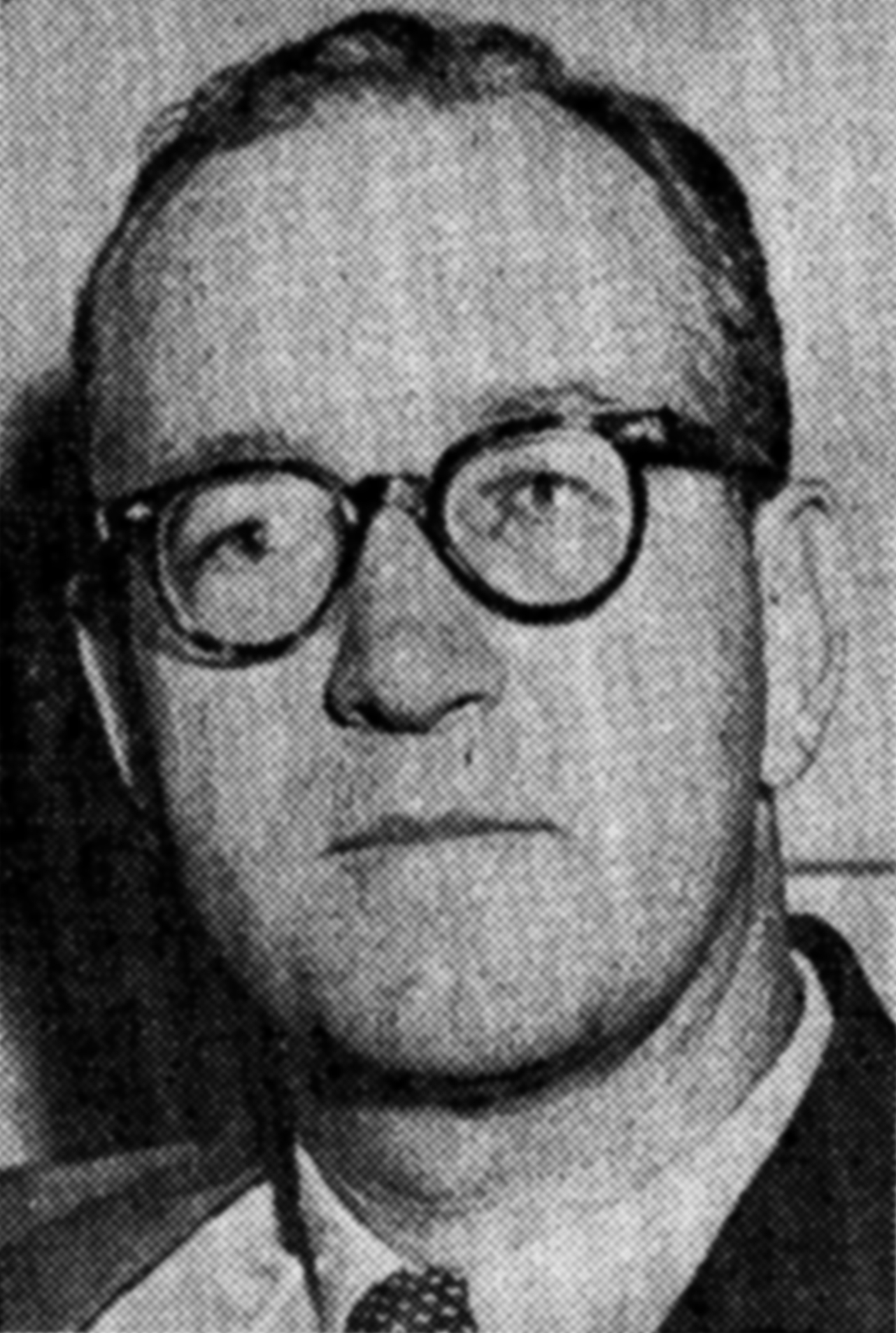
McAvoy c. 1957

Clifford Thomas McAvoy (October 30, 1904 – August 9, 1957) was an American politician and activist with the American Labor Party.

== Biography ==
McAvoy was born in New York, the son of John V. McAvoy, a Justice on the New York State Supreme Court, Appellate Division, and Marian Newcomb. McAvoy's family was influential in New York politics. His grandfather Thomas McAvoy was an ally of Tammany Hall head Charles F. Murphy and the brother of Francis S. McAvoy. As a child, McAvoy studied violin with the conductor Alexander Bloch. He was involved with the American Labor Party soon after its founding in 1936. Fiorello La Guardia unsuccessfully attempted to convince the party to nominate McAvoy as its candidate to succeed Baruch Vladeck in 1938. McAvoy never joined the Communist Party. Nevertheless, he resigned from his position as Deputy Welfare Commissioner in 1941, following accusations of Communist sympathies. He then served as the Washington representative for the United Electrical, Radio and Machine Workers of America. He resigned from this position in 1948 in order to support Henry Wallace's campaign, arguing that Truman had "reversed the progressive foreign and domestic policies of FDR".

In 1951, McAvoy was the American Labor Party's candidate for city council president, and received 6.1% of the vote. In 1953 he was the ALP's candidate for mayor of New York and received only 54,000 votes. Following McAvoy's unsuccessful electoral performance, Vito Marcantonio resigned from the ALP. In the 1956 election, McAvoy supported the Socialist Workers Party presidential candidates Farrell Dobbs and Myra Tanner Weiss. McAvoy was the chairman of the Council for Pan-American Democracy. He died of nephritis on August 9, 1957.

== Personal life ==
He married Frances Boardman Chisholm in 1930. They divorced in 1949. He later married Susan B. Anthony II. His third marriage was to Muriel Gravelle, a member of the Progressive Party in New Hampshire.
