= Daniel Read Anthony =

American publisher and activist (1824–1904)

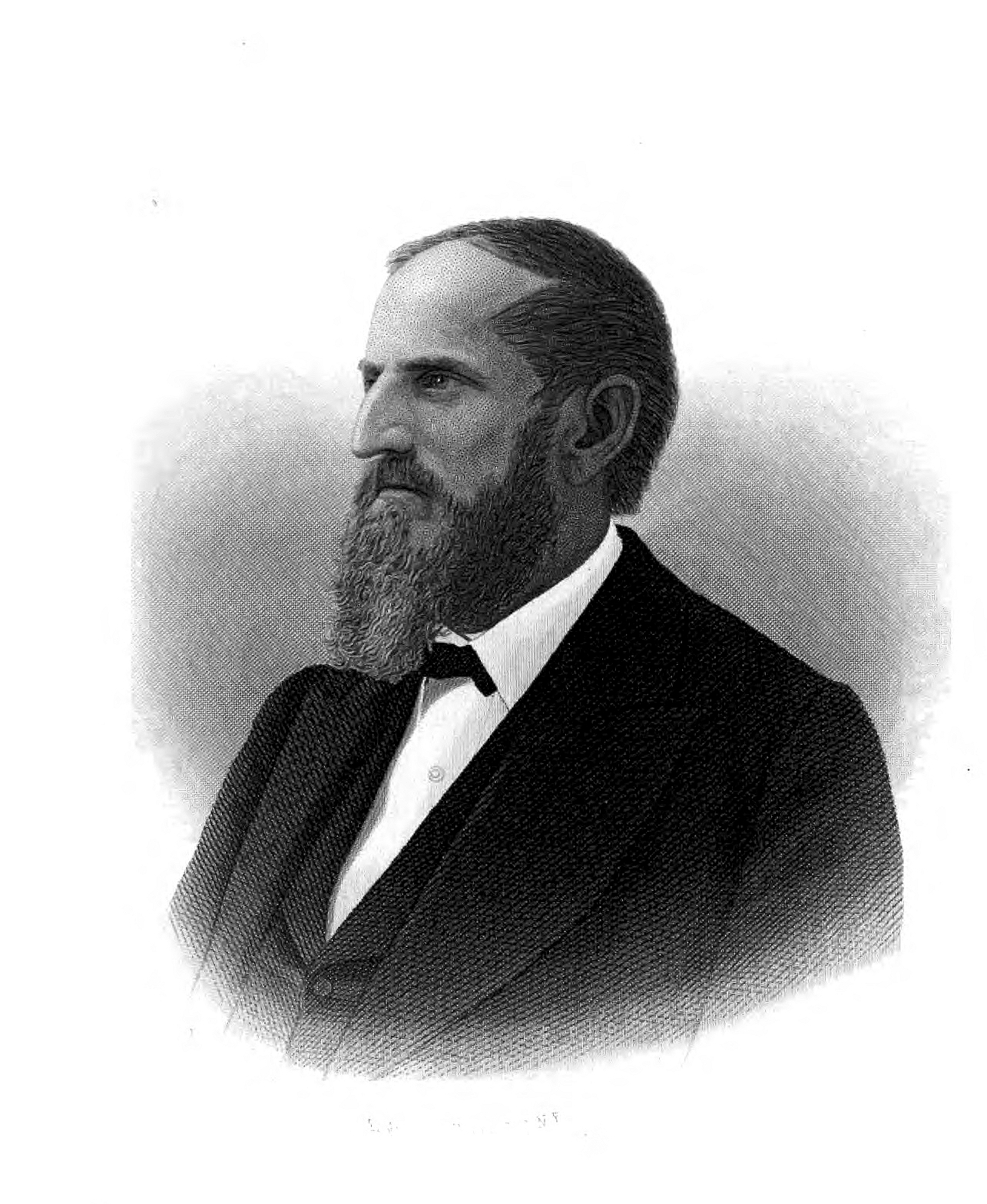
- Born: August 22, 1824; Adams, Massachusetts, U.S.
- Died: November 12, 1904 (aged 80); Leavenworth, Kansas, U.S.
- Resting place: Mount Muncie Cemetery, Lansing, Kansas, U.S.
- Occupations: Publisher, Abolitionist
- Known for: Leavenworth Times
- Spouse: Annie E. Osborn
- Children: Daniel Read Anthony Jr.
- Relatives: Susan B. Anthony (sister); Mary Stafford Anthony (sister); Susan B. Anthony II (great-niece)

Daniel Read Anthony (August 22, 1824 – November 12, 1904) was an American publisher, women's suffragist, and abolitionist. He moved to Kansas, where he published the Leavenworth Times in Leavenworth, Kansas, as well as other newspapers in the area. He was a leader of the New England Emigrant Aid Company. He was a younger brother of activist Susan B. Anthony.

He killed a man in a duel, and was shot by another man in public, due to the heated politics of the era. He was considered colorful and controversial, provoking strong emotions.

== Early life ==
Anthony was born in South Adams, Massachusetts, one of seven children of Daniel Anthony (1794–1862) and Lucy Read Anthony (1793–1880). His older sister was Susan B. Anthony. He attended school in Battenville, New York. He later worked in his father's cotton and flour mill until age 23.

== Kansas ==
Anthony first moved to Kansas in 1854 with others sponsored by the Massachusetts Emigrant Aid Company, in order to fight against the extension of slavery to the Kansas Territory. Congress was going to allow residents to determine if they wanted the territory to allow slavery. He settled in Leavenworth in 1857, residing in a house at 515 North Esplanade Street. Around this same time Anthony was involved with the Underground Railroad in Leavenworth, helping William Dominick Matthews, a freedman, provide refuge to escaped slaves.

On January 26, 1861, Anthony founded the Leavenworth Daily Conservative paper, later selling it in order to purchase the Leavenworth Times. He was also appointed as the town postmaster.

At the time, Leavenworth was the end of the telegraph line. In January 1861 Anthony printed a special edition of his newspaper and rode by horseback to Lawrence, Kansas to inform the territorial legislature that Congress had approved statehood for Kansas.

In 1861, rival publisher Robert C. Satterlee of the Kansas Herald accused Anthony of being a coward. They met on the street in Leavenworth and exchanged gunfire, resulting in the death of Satterlee. A jury acquitted Anthony in the death.

== Military service ==
During the American Civil War, in 1861 and 1862, Anthony served as a lieutenant colonel in the Union 7th Regiment Kansas Volunteer Cavalry. He saw action in Tennessee, Kentucky, Mississippi and Alabama.

He was elected as mayor of Leavenworth in 1863. He enlisted several volunteers to burn buildings of Confederate sympathizers on the edge of town. Union General Thomas Ewing Jr., who placed Leavenworth under martial law during the American Civil War, had Anthony arrested for interfering with martial law. (Anthony said that the city could maintain its own order.)

== Postwar years in Kansas ==
In 1864, Anthony bought the Leavenworth Bulletin. In 1866, he was removed as postmaster because he did not support Reconstruction policies of President Andrew Johnson, whom he thought too accommodating of the South. Johnson came to office after the assassination of President Abraham Lincoln. Anthony was elected as presiding officer of the 1868 Republican State Convention.

In 1870–1871, he was elected to the Leavenworth City Council.

In 1871, Anthony purchased the Leavenworth Times, the oldest daily newspaper in Kansas. His editorial stance on issues and his steady acquisition of newspapers were controversial, as observers did not think one man should control the newspapers.

In 1875, William Embry, rival editor of the Daily Appeal, shot Anthony at the Leavenworth Opera House, seriously wounding him. His sister Susan B. Anthony came to visit him.

After recovering from his injuries, in 1876 Anthony bought the Leavenworth Commercial, gaining a monopoly on local newspapers.

He continued to provoke strong emotions amid the heated late 19th-century politics. In 1887, Anthony was horsewhipped by a man. Many Leavenworth residents raised money by "nickel subscription" to pay the $100 fine for the man charged with horsewhipping. In 1891, the town's mayor was fined $30 (~$1,075 in 2025) for shooting and horsewhipping Anthony.

== Death and legacy ==
Anthony died at the age of 80 on November 12, 1904, in Leavenworth, Kansas. He is buried at Mount Muncie Cemetery in Lansing, Kansas.

Anthony married Anna Eliza "Annie" Osborn (1844–1930) from Edgartown, Massachusetts on January 21, 1864. They had several children together including son, Daniel Read Anthony Jr. His son Daniel Read Anthony, Jr. went into the newspaper business with his father, editing the Leavenworth Times. He was elected to the US Congress, serving more than two decades from 1907 to 1929. The Anthony family retained control of the Leavenworth Times for four generations until 1960; their last editor was Daniel R. Anthony IV.

The Anthony family home in Adams, Massachusetts, was listed on the National Register of Historic Places in 2007. It has been preserved and is operated as a museum dedicated to his sister Susan B. Anthony, a renowned leader in the women's rights and women's suffrage movement.

== See also ==
- List of mayors of Leavenworth, Kansas
