= Hickman Mills, Kansas City, Missouri =

Neighborhood of Kansas City, Missouri, U.S.

Hickman Mills
- Neighborhood
- Hickman Mills, Kansas City, Missouri
- Location within the state of Missouri
- Coordinates: 38°55′10″N 94°31′7″W
- Country: United States
- State: Missouri
- County: Jackson
- Elevation: 1,027 ft (313 m)
- Time zone: UTC-6 (Central (CST))
  - Summer (DST): UTC-5 (CDT)
- ZIP codes: 64134, 64137
- Area code: 816

Hickman Mills is a neighborhood of Kansas City, Missouri in the Kansas City metropolitan area. There is good access to the Interstate and Federal highway system, with I-435, I-470, and US-71/I-49 running through the area, including the Grandview Triangle. It also includes Longview Lake and Longview Community College. It is covered by the Hickman Mills C-1 School District.

== History ==
Positioned near the junction of the Santa Fe, California and Oregon trails (called the Three Trails area), Hickman Mills is located in the southern part of Kansas City, Missouri, and at one time was a separate community until it was annexed by the city in 1961. The town site was originally platted in 1845 by Randall Allen; it received its name when in 1854 Edwin Alfred Hickman purchased 40 acres in Washington Township to build a steam-powered grist and saw mill along Hart Grove Creek. He had moved down from Independence when wood became scarce for his mill there and he sought to take advantage of the large amount of traffic on the nearby Santa Fe Trail at that time. Its current given name is due to a clerical error in the second half of the 19th century; when the community around Hickman's Mill applied for a federal post office, the officer in Washington, D.C., mangled the name to "Hickman Mills". As late as 1930 a plat of the area still referred to it as "Hickman's Mill", while older maps even listed it as "Hickmans Mills". The exact location of the mill is not known however one reference indicates that it was about 100 feet north of the junction of Hickman Mills Drive and Hillcrest Road, next to Hart Grove Creek which originally ran about 50 feet west, and about 300 feet south of the town center. During the Financial Panic of 1857 local banks closed and credit and money became scarce; Hickman had extended credit to so many in the community that he himself became insolvent and the mill closed just a few years later in 1859. Hickman ended up going west to look for gold in Colorado and the mill was sold, the lumber from the mill being used to build other structures. An Independence milling company purchased the equipment, and a local neighbor, Solomon Young (great-grandfather to President Harry S Truman) used some of the lumber to build a barn. A pool used by the mill for boiler water was converted to use for baptisms of the nearby church. Even with the mill gone and the Santa Fe Trail growing into disuse after 1870, the town continued to grow, with the local Post Office serving the residents of both Hickman Mills and what became the town of Grandview, 4 miles south. Rail service arrived a few years later, connecting the town directly to Kansas City.

== The War Years ==
The area surrounding Hickman Mills suffered greatly during the Civil War; Jayhawkers looted and pillaged while guerrillas led by men such as William Quantrill frequented the town and fought the Jayhawkers as well as against Federal troops. The opening scenes in the Clint Eastwood western The Outlaw Josey Wales are to have taken place in Jackson County and depict the Civil War in Missouri; other movies such as Ride with the Devil did the same and was partially filmed in neighboring Clay County.

The survival of Hickman Mills during the Civil War was largely due to one man. Charles Jefferys was a prominent business man who emigrated from Belgium, heir to a fortune from holdings in the British West Indies. The young civil engineer purchased up to 1800 acres in various tracts between the Blue and Little Blue rivers in Washington Township, including land around Hickman's Mill. Using immigrant and slave labor, he built two mansions in the area, and a large portion of his land now contains one of the two local high schools, Ruskin High School. Jefferys suffered during the Civil War as many did here. His farm manager, Jacob Palmer, learned that Jayhawkers planned to murder Jefferys, ostensibly under the assumption that he had assisted the local rebel guerrillas and for his ownership of slaves. William Quantrill often stayed at the farm of David Tate on Red Bridge, just two miles away, and one of Quantrill's lieutenants, George Todd, owned a farm along the Blue River at Red Bridge (he and his father built the original Red Bridge over the river). Learning of the threat, Jefferys' wife begged him to leave, but as he feared the Jayhawkers would burn the farm, he remained while sending his wife and children to Philadelphia to stay with his wife's family. His farm had been visited by men asking for Jefferys' assistance; Henry Younger, father of guerrilla and future Jesse James Gang member Cole Younger, had been shot and was at Dodson, a small community north west at the current location of 85th Street and Prospect. Palmer had been asked to bring the body back to Hickman Mills for it to be picked up and taken back to Younger's home in Harrisonville. Palmer did make the trip to Dodson, but discovered Union soldiers had already moved it to Olathe, in Kansas. The following month, Quantrill and his men captured Independence, prompting numerous reprisal raids by Jayhawkers. Local farmers armed themselves and in one instance, captured several Jayhawkers looting a local home. Not wanting to keep the prisoners for any length of time, they attempted to take them to local authorities and had stopped at Jefferys farm when they were intercepted by a Quantrill patrol. Quantrill's men took charge of the prisoners, led them out the large gate where Ruskin High School now stands, and disappeared into the brush near the Little Blue river. It is assumed they were executed by Quantrill immediately after.

During this period occurred the Raid on Lawrence, Kansas by Quantrill and 450 of his men. The raid was a reprisal for a number of incidents and resulted in Lawrence being completely burned, and most of the male residents being murdered. The end result of this raid was the issuance of General Order No. 11, which ordered all residents of Jackson County and nearby counties to leave their homes and the county immediately. The exceptions were for those who lived within a mile of a military post and had taken an oath of loyalty to the Union. All property left behind was to be burned or confiscated by the military. One of Jefferys' homes became a military post, Post Number One. Thirty-two local families lived at his farm for the duration of the war, their farms and property destroyed. Palmer at one point recounted seeing seventeen houses in a circle all around their property in flames. The Order's goal was to break the rebellion in Jackson County and halt the support of the local guerrillas, but it instead hardened the resolve of Quantrill and his men, who continued to fight with widespread support of the local populace. After Confederate General Sterling Price's incursion back into Missouri, the area was devastated further by both northern and southern soldiers in the battles that raged throughout the county and rampant looting that occurred as troops, Jayhawkers, and bushwhackers transited the area.

== Growth after 1865 ==
It took decades for the area to recover from the devastation of the war; most anthologies of the Civil War neglect the battles that took place on the western frontier. While the battles in the east were vast and impersonal, the war in Missouri and Kansas was very personal, pitting neighbors and families against one another after the passage of the Kansas–Nebraska Act in 1854. Charles Jefferys was owed $20,000 by the military at the close of the war; it was never repaid and Jefferys ended up relocating to Philadelphia permanently. His properties and farms continued to be run; however Jeffereys' son returned to Hickman Mills to slowly sell off the land. The last section was sold in 1905. A large portion ended as the current location of Ruskin High School, another portion, donated by the family in 1899, was to become a rail stop and depot for the community. When the St. Louis and San Francisco (FRISCO) rail line wanted to build a stop nearby, the family donated the land on condition it be named for the family. Thus, the depot of Jefferys was established one half mile west of Hickman Mills, along Red Bridge Road west of current US-71. The station had an agent and telegraph service until 1914, when the depot was destroyed by fire. Service continued until 1954, however passengers had to flag the train to stop. In recent years the rails have been completely removed, Red Bridge Road realigned, and the location of the original stop and depot are approximately where the off-ramp of southbound US-71 now exists.

After the war life resumed and the first school was built in 1866 and was located at what is now the SE corner of Hillcrest Road and Longview road; the land was donated by local farmer George Hedges and the school named Hedges school. A later structure, Hickman School, was built in 1916 after consolidation with Jones school two miles west and was the first permanent brick school. It was located at what is now the corner of Longview Road and Grandview Road, about 1/2 mile west of the original. This building, one of the four original schools to comprise the new Hickman Mills C-1 School District still stands but has been out of service as a school since 1980.

Most of the homes in the area were built in the early to mid-1950s and 1960s, although a handful of houses that are pre-1920 exist at the original town center located at the corner of Hillcrest Road and Red Bridge Road, just east of US-71. At this corner exists the beautiful stone church complex known as Hickman Mills Community Church. The church, originally established in 1845 at 87th Street and Raytown Road in Raytown, was relocated to Hickman Mills and is the third-oldest Christian church in Jackson County. The church was built on land donated by Hickman and was located north of the mill, and was a frame structure built in a conservative style with two front doors, one for men and one for women. By 1896 the congregation had expanded to 75 members and a larger structure was constructed. By 1929 the congregation had again doubled and the ornate stone building that exists today was built; this building received an award from the Kansas City chapter of the American Institute of Architects as well as 1st prize from a church architecture competition sponsored by the Christian Herald. One of the millstones from Hickman's Mill can still be seen at the church.

Northeast of the church is a smaller stone building with the date "1921" on the face which once served as the town bank. Across from the original bank building is an old frame structure that served as a community center and post office with a gymnasium on the 2nd floor, and next door is the original telephone exchange building. In the early 1950s the telephone exchange for Hickman Mills was "DW", for DWight. During the later 1950s and 1960s it was "SO", for SOuthland. About 1/2 mile east of town center along Red Bridge Road on the north side near the fire station is a monument to General Order No. 11, the Civil War-era action that forced residents of this and adjoining counties to leave their farms immediately.

The local area included the former Bannister Mall and other shopping centers and has seen a decline in the past few years, with most of the buildings vacant and the mall, once the largest in the region, torn down in 2009.

The Santa Fe Trail featured prominently in the early years of the settlement's founding. It entered the area along what is now Old Santa Fe Road from 87th Street (forming the boundary of the current Hickman Mills High School and Santa Fe Elementary), turned at Palestine Cemetery (founded 1876), then turned at what is now 93rd Street. From 93rd Street it crossed the property that once contained the Mall, turned west down Bannister Road (formerly County Highway W) and turned south at the town of Holmes Park between what is now Marion Park Drive (the former rail bed of the FRISCO line) and Hickman Mills Drive (old US-71) to a point about one mile northwest of the original town site. It eventually crossed the Blue River at a ford just north of the existing bridge along Red Bridge Road at Minor Park, about 2 1/2 miles due west of town. A spur from the trail may have run towards Hickman's Mill; starting at 93rd Street at Palestine Cemetery, it would have run south along what is now Bennington Avenue to Red Bridge Road, but further research is needed. The location of one of the current high schools, Hickman Mills Sr. High (and the adjoining Santa Fe Elementary) is on the grounds of a Santa Fe Trail campsite. About one mile away is a small park (Schumacher Park) commemorating the Santa Fe Trail with maps of the route through Hickman Mills and other information.

In 1957 the Ruskin Heights tornado ripped through the area before hitting Ruskin Heights, killing 44, and destroying hundreds of buildings including Ruskin High School. The school was rebuilt and a monument to the victims of the tornado is located near the school at the corner of E. 111th St. and Blue Ridge Blvd.
