= Skirmish near Brooklyn, Kansas =

Battle of the American Civil War

Coordinates: 38.752546°N 95.242758°W

- Part of the American Civil War
Date	August 21, 1863
Location	South of Brooklyn, Kansas
Result	See Skirmish section

Belligerents
Confederate States of America	United States

Commanders and leaders
William Quantrill; George Todd	Preston B. Plumb; Jim Lane

Units involved
Quantrill's Raiders	Militia; 9th Kansas Volunteer Cavalry Regiment

The skirmish near Brooklyn, Kansas was a skirmish of the American Civil War on August 21, 1863, between Quantrill's Raiders and pursuing Union forces immediately after the Lawrence massacre. James Henry Lane led a small group of survivors of the massacre in pursuit of Quantrill's men, and were joined by a force of about 200 Union Army cavalrymen, commanded by Major Preston B. Plumb. Lane's and Plumb's men fought with Quantrill's Raiders to the south of the town of Brooklyn, Kansas, which the raiders had burned. The Confederates began to panic, but a charge led by George Todd halted the Union pursuit. Quantrill's men escaped across the state line into Missouri and then scattered; a few were later caught and executed.

== Background ==
During the American Civil War, much of the fighting in the state of Missouri was guerrilla warfare. The neighboring state of Kansas was largely abolitionist, while some of Missouri's residents supported slavery. Informal military forces from Kansas were known as Jayhawkers, and the pro-slavery Missouri guerrillas were known as bushwhackers. Both sides committed atrocities, such as murder, theft, and wanton destruction. One of the most notorious bushwhacker groups was Quantrill's Raiders, which was led by William Clarke Quantrill, who had a captain's commission in the Confederate States Army; the historian James M. McPherson described the band as containing "some of the most psychopathic killers in American history". In August 1863, Quantrill gathered 450 men and entered Kansas. They kidnapped locals, forced them to serve as guides on the way to the city of Lawrence, Kansas, and then murdered them.

Lawrence was selected as the target for the raid, as it was viewed in Missouri as a center of abolitionism and Jayhawkers. The city was also home to Jayhawker leader Jim Lane, who was hated in Missouri as a notorious Jayhawker leader. Quantrill stated that the raid was revenge for the earlier Sacking of Osceola, Missouri. The historian Albert E. Castel suggests that it was unlikely that the bushwhackers had motivations other than stealing and killing. In the ensuing Lawrence Massacre on August 21, Quantrill's men destroyed 185 buildings and killed 182 men and boys, having been told by their leader to "kill every male and burn every house".

== Skirmish ==
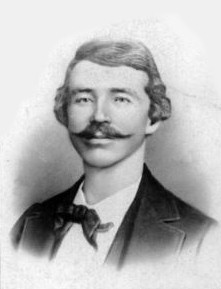
William Clarke Quantrill

Later that day, after the massacre, some of Quantrill's men detected Union soldiers approaching, and the guerrillas left the town, moving the roads towards Baldwin, until they reached the Santa Fe Trail at Brooklyn, Kansas. Brooklyn was 12 miles (19 km) from Lawrence. Local farmers had warned Brooklyn's residents of the approach of Quantrill, so the town was abandoned when the bushwhackers arrived. Quantrill expected Union forces to already be blocking the route he had taken into Kansas, so he decided to withdraw in a southeasterly direction towards some woods around the Marais des Cygnes River. He also ordered Brooklyn burned. All of the town's buildings were destroyed except for the saloon. Historian Katie Armitage suggests that the burning of the town was possibly fueled by adrenaline and alcohol consumption, while a research paper published with Baker University proposes that Quantrill's men may have been targeting local members of a pacifist sect who had earlier been forced out of Missouri by pro-slavery advocates.

Lane, who had survived the massacre by hiding in a cornfield, gathered about a dozen men after the bushwhackers left, and followed after Quantrill, armed with pepperbox revolvers, knives, and shotguns. Lane's force gathered more men during the pursuit, and reached Brooklyn with about 35 men. Lane's men kicked up a cloud of dust, which alerted Quantrill's guerrillas of their approach; the bushwhackers began a retreat. A force of about 200 Union Army cavalrymen under Major Preston B. Plumb who had been trying to locate Quantrill's force since before the massacre met up with Lane's force, and made contact with the bushwhackers beyond Brooklyn. Shots were fired to no effect, and Quantrill's men began to become disorderly and panic while passing down a lane through a cornfield. Guerrilla leader George M. Todd rallied 20 bushwhackers and charged the Federal cavalry, driving them back with losses on both sides. Todd was given command of the rearguard and a pattern of brief firefights ensued as Todd's men would set up a defense and hold off the Union vanguard until the main Union force would catch up. At that point the raiders would ride to reach Quantrill and repeat the pattern as they withdrew towards Paola.

== Aftermath ==
Union forces attempted to set a trap for Quantrill in the area of Paola, but the bushwhackers fought off a small Union charge and then bypassed a planned ambush. The bushwhackers avoided a force of 150 Missouri militiamen at the Missouri/Kansas state line, and had scattered within Missouri by the end of August 22. A handful of the bushwhackers were later caught and executed. The Lawrence Massacre caused widespread outrage, and led to Union Brigadier General Thomas Ewing Jr. issuing General Order No. 11, which depopulated 10,000 civilians from parts of four counties in western Missouri.

== See also ==
- List of battles fought in Kansas
- List of massacres in Kansas

== Sources ==
- Brownlee, Richard S. (1989) [1958]. Gray Ghosts of the Confederacy: Guerrilla Warfare in the West 1861–1865 (Louisiana Paperback ed.). Baton Rouge, Louisiana: Louisiana State University Press. ISBN 0-8071-1162-7.
- Castel, Albert E. (1997) [1958]. Civil War Kansas: Reaping the Whirlwind. Lawrence, Kansas: University Press of Kansas. ISBN 978-0-7006-0872-0.
- Castel, Albert E. (1999) [1962]. William Clarke Quantrill: His Life and Times. Norman, Oklahoma: University of Oklahoma Press. ISBN 0-8061-3081-4.
- McPherson, James M. (1988). Battle Cry of Freedom. Oxford: Oxford University Press. ISBN 0-19-503863-0.
- Schultz, Duane (1996). Quantrill's War: The Life and Times of William Clarke Quantrill 1837–1865. New York: St. Martin's Griffin. ISBN 0-312-16972-8.
