= Coldwater Grove's Post =

During the Civil War, Coldwater Grove existed 13 1/2 miles east of Paola, Kansas, in Miami County. It straddled the Kansas-Missouri border, being partly in both states. About June 1863 a Union military post was established on the Kansas side of the community and the post was put under the command of Lt. Col. Charles S. Clark. Clark also commanded four nearby posts.

On August 20, 1863, Clark learned that Confederate guerrillas under William C. Quantrill were camped nearby. Clark sent scouts to determine what Quantrill was doing and he ordered troops from two other posts to reinforce Coldwater Grove. Clark learned Quantrill moved into Kansas in the night and Clark left with a force of thirty men in a belated and hopeless attempt to pursue Quantrill. Quantrill was on his way to raid Lawrence, Kansas. The Lawrence Massacre resulted.

Through at least June 1865 Coldwater Grove was maintained as a Union military post. Possibly a stockade was built to protect the post in or after August 1864. At times the post was temporarily vacated when its troops were deployed to defend other areas. Possibly in October 1864, during Maj. Gen. Sterling Price's Missouri raid (see Price's Raid), the post was abandoned. At least Union correspondence indirectly indicated this was the case.

Guerrillas were apparently still active in May 1865. Capt. A. J. Lumsden wrote in a report the troops from Coldwater Grove killed one. The last known report concerning the post was dated June 3, 1865.
