= Battle of Brooklyn (disambiguation) =

The Battle of Brooklyn was a battle during the American Revolutionary War.

Battle of Brooklyn may also refer to:

- Battle of Brooklyn (college rivalry), an athletics rivalry between St. Francis College and Long Island University
- Skirmish near Brooklyn, Kansas, a battle during the American Civil War
