= Fort Lane =

Fort Lane may refer to:

- Fort Lane (Kansas)
- Fort Lane (North Carolina), a former U.S. Army post in James City
- Fort Lane (Oregon)
