= Fort Lane (Kansas) =

Coordinates: 38.9591°N 95.2426°W

Fort Lane, Kansas
- Mount Oread, Lawrence, Kansas

Site information
- Type: local militia fort
- Controlled by: Lawrence residents from 1856 to 1864; U.S. Army 1864 to 1865

Site history
- Built: 1856
- In use: 1856 - April 1865 or later
- Materials: limestone

Fort Lane, on the crest of Mount Oread, then southwest of Lawrence, Kansas, was built by the residents of Lawrence in 1856 to serve as a lookout post to observe groups of men desiring to attack Lawrence. Lawrence was a free-state community built by northerners. From 1854 to 1861, when Kansas became a state, at times the area around Lawrence was a battleground for settlers who had come from both the northern and southern states. From this location, one could see for many miles in all directions.

In 1859 John Ingalls described the fort, writing, "[It is] a rough, irregular structure of . . . lime stone, four feet high, with embrasures for cannon on three sides." The structure did not have a roof. Lieut. Col. Pierre St. George Cooke referred to the fort as a "small fort of rough dry wall."

During the Civil War the fort on Mount Oread was intermittently used as a lookout post. Ironically, it was not used when William C. Quantrill approached Lawrence Aug. 21, 1863, when he raided the town and killed 150 to 180 of its residents. By February 1864 the U.S. Army established a post and a fort on Mount Oread and Fort Lane was incorporated into the new system. After the Army abandoned the Mount Oread Civil War posts, Fort Lane stood many years until the University of Kansas campus encroached upon it, resulting in its demise.
