= Caroline Abbot Stanley =

American novelist

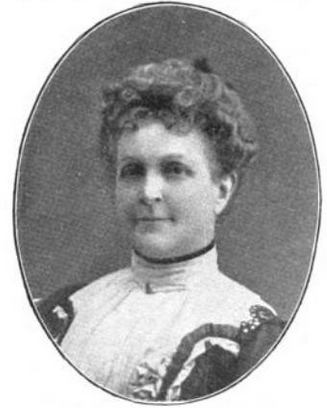
- Stanley c. 1904
- Born: 1849; Callaway County, Missouri
- Occupations: Writer, teacher
- Spouse: Elisha Stanley (m. 1871; died 1875)
- Writing career
- Notable work: Order No. 11 (1904)

Caroline Abbot Stanley (born August 16, 1849) was an American author. Her best known book was the Civil War novel Order No. 11 (1904), which was a regional best seller.

== Biography ==
Carolina Abbot was born in Callaway County, Missouri in 1849. She married Elisha Stanley in 1871 at Pleasant Hill, Missouri. Her husband died in 1875, and she then taught school in Kalamazoo, Michigan. After 1896 she became a full-time writer.

In 1904, she published Order No. 11, a historical novel which takes its name from General Order No. 11 (1863), a Union Army directive issued during the American Civil War on August 25, 1863, forcing the evacuation of rural areas in four counties in western Missouri. Order No. 11 appeared on regional-best seller lists in The Bookman in 1904.

Her follow-up novel A Modern Madonna (1906) was adapted to silent film in 1922's The Forgotten Law.
