= Esian Henderson =

American basketball player (born 1985)

Free agent
- Position: Power forward

Personal information
- Born: June 14, 1985 (age 41) Kansas City, Missouri, U.S.
- Listed height: 6 ft 8.75 in (2.05 m)
- Listed weight: 220 lb (100 kg)

Career information
- High school: Ruskin (Kansas City, Missouri)
- College: North Central Missouri (2005–2007); Central Missouri (2007–2009)
- NBA draft: 2009: undrafted
- Playing career: 2009–present

Career history
- 2009–2010: Kansas City Soul
- 2010–2011: Astrum Levice
- 2011: →Levicki Patriot
- 2011–2012: Applied Science University
- 2012: Zalakerámia ZTE
- 2012: LF Basket
- 2013: Iowa Energy
- 2014: Brno
- 2015: İstanbul DSİ
- 2015–2016: Bondi Ferrara
- 2016: Tampereen Pyrintö
- 2017–2018: Panionios
- 2018: Soproni KC

Career highlights
- Slovak League champion (2011)

Esian Henderson (born June 14, 1985) is an American professional basketball player who last played for Soproni KC of the Hungarian League. Standing at 2.05 metres (6 feet 9 inches), he plays the power forward position. After two years at North Central Missouri College and two years at Central Missouri, Henderson entered the 2009 NBA draft but was not selected in the draft's two rounds.

== High school career ==
Henderson played high school basketball at Ruskin High School, in Kansas City, Missouri.

== College career ==
Henderson started his college career with North Central Missouri. In his sophomore season, Kravic averaged 14.1 points and 6.4 rebounds. The next season, he was transferred to Central Missouri. During his senior year, Henderson was a role player averaging 4.8 points and 3.2 rebounds per game.

== Professional career ==
On January 27, 2014, Henderson joined Brno of the NBL. On January 27, 2015, he joined İstanbul DSİ of the TBL.

Henderson started the 2015–2016 season at Italy's second-highest level with Bondi Ferrara, where he averaged 9.3 points and 7.0 rebounds. In February 2016, he moved to Finland's mainstream in Tampereen Pyrintö. He was able to play eight regular season games, scoring 14.5 points and 5.9 rebounds per game. Henderson only missed one round in regular single-digit standings, and on March 18, he scored 27 points against Kouvot . Two days earlier he had 12 points and 12 rebounds against Kauhajoki Karhu. Pyrintö finished fourth in the season and won the playoffs first round against Bisons Loimaa and in the semi-finals against Helsinki Seagulls.

On October 2, 2017, he joined Panionios of the Greek Basket League. On January 18, 2018, he left Panionios and joined Soproni KC of the Hungarian League.
