= Hickman Mills C-1 School District =

School district in Missouri, U.S.

Address
- 5401 East 103rd Street Kansas City, Missouri, 64137; United States

District information
- Type: Public
- Grades: PreK–12
- NCES District ID: 2914340

Students and staff
- Students: 5,007
- Teachers: 401.32
- Staff: 370.73
- Student–teacher ratio: 12.48

Other information
- Website: www.hickmanmills.org

Hickman Mills C-1 School District (HMC-1) is a school district headquartered in Kansas City, Missouri, serving Hickman Mills. The enrollment is approximately 5,600 students. It was the first consolidated (hence the C-1) school district in Missouri.

== Schools ==
High schools:

- Ruskin High School

Middle:

- Hickman Mills Middle School
- Brooks-Sharp Sixth Grade Center at Santa Fe

Elementary:

- Compass Elementary School
- Ingels Elementary School
- Irvin Elementary School
- Warford Elementary School
- Dobbs elementary school

Preschool:

- John Parks Early Learning Center
- Freda Markley Early Childhood Center

Other:

- Burke Academy
- Crittenton Center

Closed:

- Hickman Mills High School
- Alvin Brooks Middle School
- Johnson Elementary School
- Symington Elementary School, which was opened in 1958, closed in 2019, and is named for the former Missouri Senator Stuart Symington

Smith hale junior high
