= Aireontae Ersery =

American football player (born 2002)

No. 79 – Houston Texans
- Position: Offensive tackle
- Roster status: Active

Personal information
- Born: February 19, 2002 (age 24); Kansas City, Missouri, U.S.
- Listed height: 6 ft 6 in (1.98 m)
- Listed weight: 330 lb (150 kg)

Career information
- High school: Ruskin (Kansas City)
- College: Minnesota (2020–2024)
- NFL draft: 2025: 2nd round, 48th overall pick

Career history
- Houston Texans (2025–present)

Awards and highlights
- Big Ten Offensive Lineman of the Year (2024); First-team All-Big Ten (2024); Second-team All-Big Ten (2023)

Career NFL statistics as of Week 10, 2026
- Games played: 25
- Games started: 25
- Stats at Pro Football Reference

Aireontae Lamont Ersery (AIR-ee-on-tay ER-ser-ee; born February 19, 2002) is an American professional football offensive tackle for the Houston Texans of the National Football League (NFL). He played college football for the Minnesota Golden Gophers and was selected by the Texans in the second round of the 2025 NFL draft.

== Early life ==
Ersery was born on February 19, 2002, in Kansas City, Missouri. He grew up in the Ruskin Heights neighborhood of Kansas City. He was raised by his mother, Takita Charles, alongside his five other siblings (Danny, Dean, Cherish, Journey, and Rain). During his childhood, Ersery’s family faced severe financial hardship, his mother worked 3 jobs to support Aireontae and his siblings, often facing threats of eviction. As a child, Ersery was resourceful, and often helped provide his family with water among other necessities. Ersery later attended Ruskin High School. Originally, Ersery had his sights set on playing basketball, but was drawn into football through Ruskin High School football coach William Perkins. Ersery also participated in track and field and wrestling. He was rated as a three-star recruit and committed to play college football for the Minnesota Golden Gophers.

== College career ==
In Ersery's first two collegiate football seasons in 2020 and 2021, he played in two games, while making one start for Minnesota. In 2022, he started all 13 games for the Gophers, earning honorable mention all-Big Ten Conference recognition. In 2023, Ersery started all 13 games at left tackle for the Gophers and earned second-team all-Big 10 honors.

== Professional career ==
Pre-draft measurables
Height	Weight	Arm length	Hand span	Wingspan	40-yard dash	10-yard split	20-yard split	20-yard shuttle	Three-cone drill	Vertical jump	Broad jump	Bench press
6 ft 6 in (1.98 m)	331 lb (150 kg)	33 1/8 in (0.84 m)	9 1/2 in (0.24 m)	6 ft 8 7/8 in (2.05 m)	5.01 s	1.75 s	2.88 s	4.82 s	7.81 s	29.5 in (0.75 m)	9 ft 3 in (2.82 m)	25 reps
All values from NFL Combine

Ersery was selected in the second round with the 48th pick in the 2025 NFL draft by the Houston Texans. On December 26, 2025, Ersery underwent surgery to repair a broken thumb, which caused him to miss the team's Week 17 game against the Los Angeles Chargers.
