= North Central Missouri College =

Community college in Trenton, Missouri, U.S.

- Former name: Trenton Junior College
- Type: Public community college
- Established: 1925
- Affiliations: National Junior College Athletic Association, North Central Association of Colleges and Schools
- President: Lenny Klaver
- Faculty: 246 (27% full time)
- Students: 1,458 (757 full time/701 part time)
- Location: Trenton, Missouri, United States; 40°04′41″N 93°37′06″W
- Colors: Red and Black
- Mascot: Pirates
- Website: www.ncmissouri.edu

North Central Missouri College (formerly Trenton Junior College) is a public community college in Trenton, Missouri. Founded in 1925, the main campus has grown to include nine buildings used as instruction facilities, library and testing center, a tutoring center, a community center, a student center, a career center, an art gallery, two residence halls, and a technology center.

NCMC is accredited by the Higher Learning Commission.

== Athletics ==
The school competes in Division II of the National Junior College Athletic Association. Its mascot is the Pirates.

- Men – Baseball, Basketball, Golf
- Women – Softball, Basketball, Golf

== Satellite campuses ==
=== Savannah campus ===
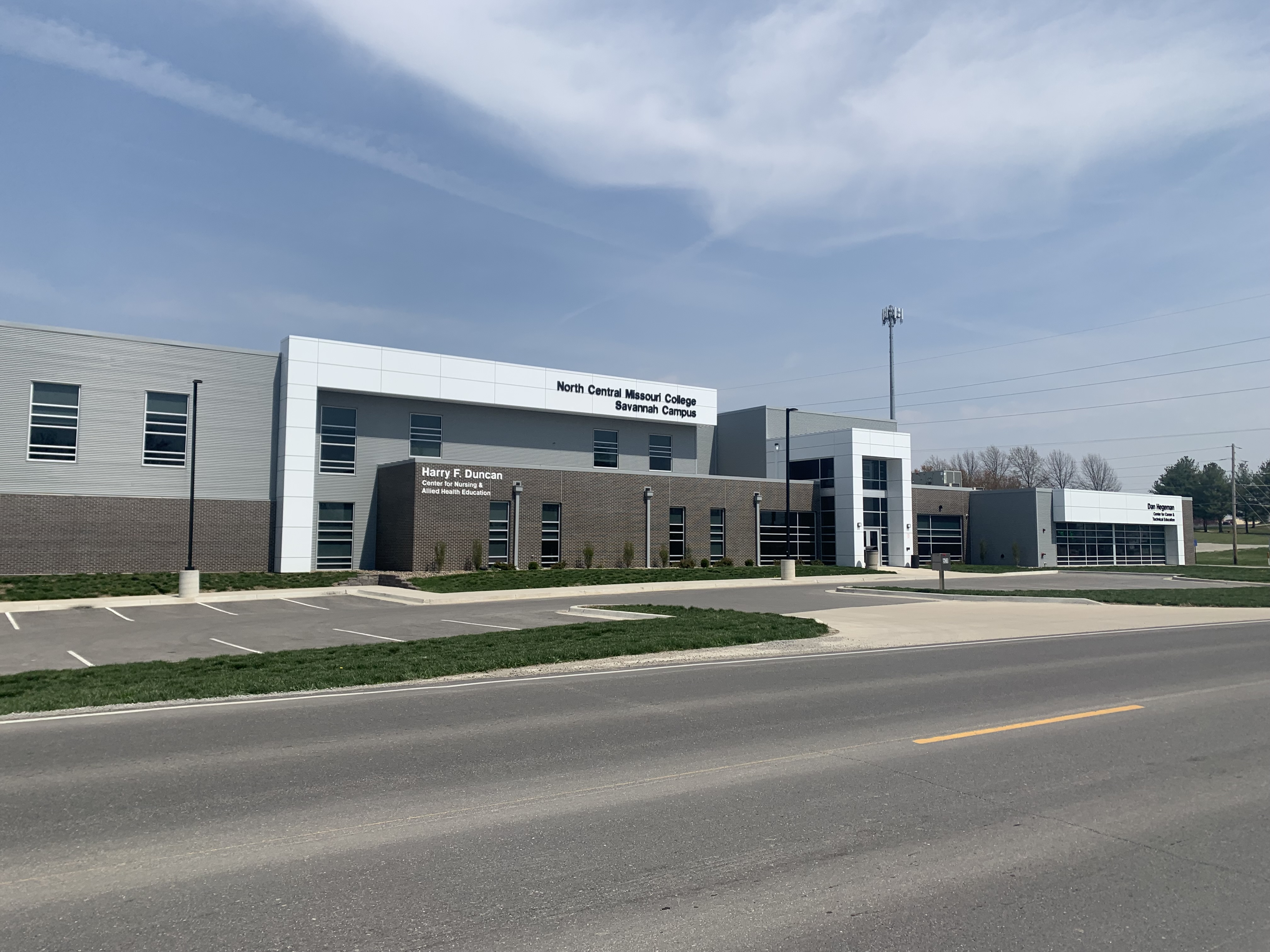
Savannah Campus of North Central Missouri College

On April 21, 2022, NCMC broke ground on a new campus in Savannah, Missouri. The new campus merged three previous satellite campuses (Maryville, Bethany, and the North Belt Center) into a single campus. A limited opening of the campus began in November 2022, with the full campus officially opening on August 9, 2023.

=== Barton Farms campus ===
In 2011, NCMC opened the Barton Farm Campus just south of Trenton. The campus includes three classroom buildings: the Lager Laboratory of Plant & Energy Science, the Metcalf Mechanical Resource Center and Kuttler Animal Science building. The farm campus encompasses 138 acres of farm ground given to the college by the Barton family. A wind turbine, two-acre pond, and numerous test plots are located on the farm campus to support learning.

== Notable alumni ==
- Rex Barnett (born 1938), politician, and former officer of the Missouri State Highway Patrol
- Esian Henderson, former professional basketball player
