= Sacking of Osceola =

1861 anti-slavery attack in Missouri, US

Coordinates: 38°2′47″N 93°41′58″W

- Part of American Civil War
- Location: Osceola, Missouri
- Date: September 23, 1861
- Target: Citizens of Osceola
- Attack type: Arson, Looting
- Deaths: 9
- Perpetrator: Pro-Union Jayhawkers

The sacking of Osceola was a Kansas Jayhawker initiative on September 23, 1861, to push out pro-slavery Southerners at Osceola, Missouri. It was not authorized by Union military authorities but was the work of an informal group of anti-slavery Kansas "Jayhawkers". The town of 2,077 people was plundered and burned to the ground, 200 slaves were freed and nine local citizens were court-martialed and executed.

== Background ==
Following Sterling Price's Missouri State Guard victory over General Nathaniel Lyon's Union army at the Battle of Wilson's Creek, Price continued to push North through Western Missouri.

Lyon moved to intercept the Missouri State Guard, but was defeated by Price at the Battle of Dry Wood Creek. Lyon retreated and Price continued his offensive further into Missouri to the Siege of Lexington.

While Price moved North, Colonel James Henry Lane launched an attack behind him. After crossing the Missouri border at Trading Post, Kansas on September 10, Lane began an offensive moving East on Butler, Harrisonville, Osceola and Clinton, Missouri.

== Osceola ==
The climax of the campaign was on September 23, 1861, at Osceola, where Lane's forces drove off a small Southern force and then looted and burned the town. An artillery battery under Capt. Thomas Moonlight shelled the St. Clair County courthouse. According to reports, many of the Kansans got so drunk that when it came time to leave they were unable to march and had to ride in wagons and carriages. They carried off with them a tremendous load of plunder, including as Lane's personal share a piano and a quantity of silk dresses. Lane led hundreds of slaves to Kansas and freedom. The troops moved northwest and arrived at Kansas City, Missouri, on September 29, to pursue Price as he retreated south through the state.

Osceola was captured and then plundered, with Lane's men freeing 200 slaves and taking 350 horses, 400 cattle, 3,000 bags of flour, and quantities of supplies from all the town shops and stores as well as carriages and wagons. Nine local men were rounded up, given a quick drumhead court-martial trial, and executed. All but three of the town's 800 buildings burned; the town never fully recovered.

== Aftermath ==
Lane's raid stirred hatred that led to William Quantrill's raid on Lawrence, Kansas, leading in turn to the depopulation of four counties of western Missouri under General Order No. 11.

The massacre is depicted in the movie The Outlaw Josey Wales.
