= George and Annie Bell House =

Historic house in Kansas, United States

- U.S. National Register of Historic Places
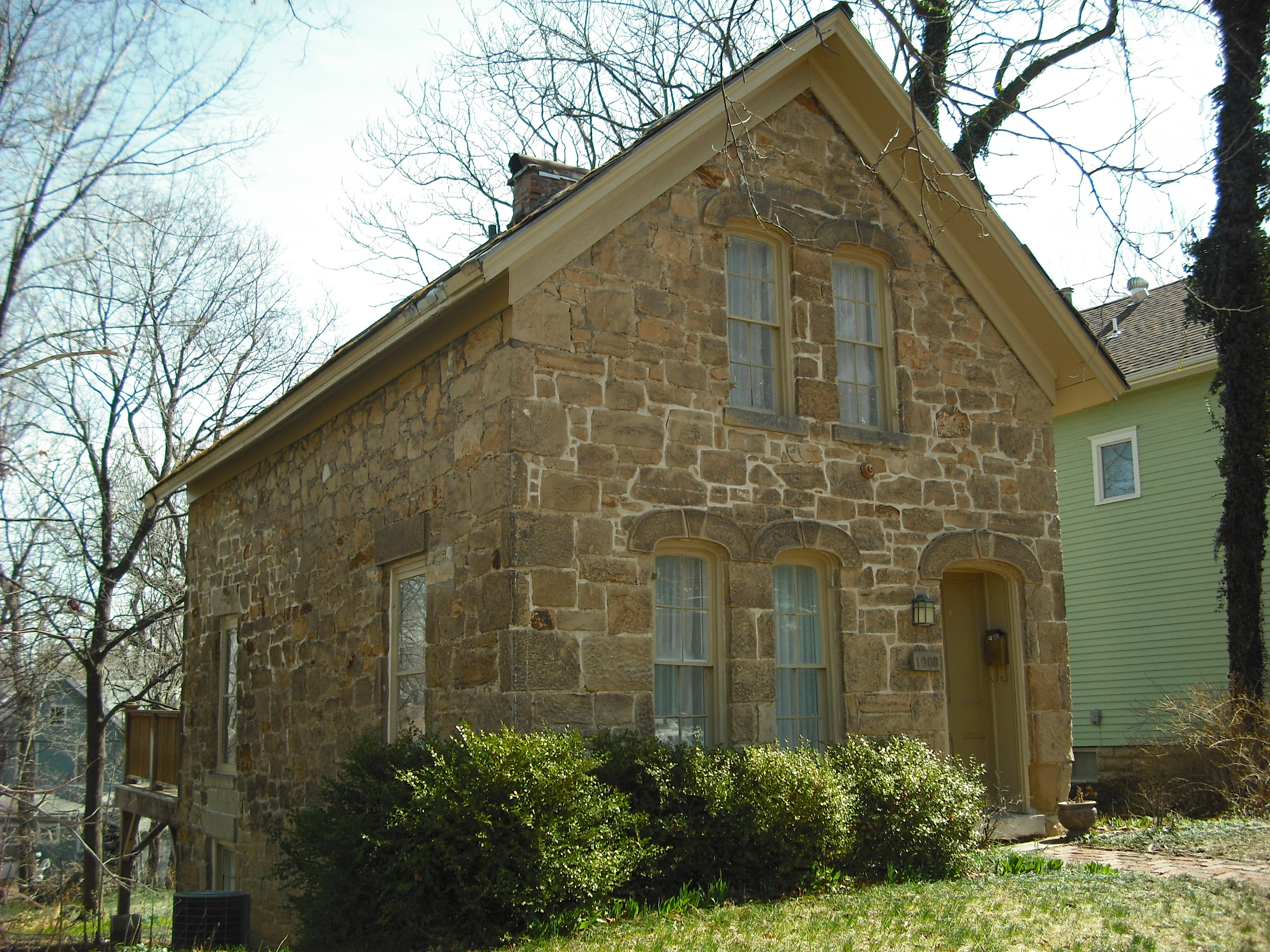
- The Bell House in 2009

- Location within Kansas Location within the United States
- Location: 1008 Ohio Street, Lawrence, Kansas
- Coordinates: 38°57′55″N 95°14′25″W
- Built: 1862–1863
- NRHP reference No.: 83000423
- Added to NRHP: August 11, 1983

The George and Annie Bell House was built in 1862–1863 in Lawrence, Kansas, by Douglas County Clerk George Bell. The one-and-a-half-story stone structure was constructed from locally mined limestone. In October 1862, George Bell paid sixty dollars for an empty lot and construction on the house began. On August 21, 1863, he and his family were residing in the unfinished house during Quantrill's raid. George Bell attempted to defend Lawrence from the attack, but was shot and killed. The raiders then attempted to burn down the house, but the Bell family was able to save it. The home was occupied on and off for several years by his widow, Annie, and her children, who frequently lived in the cellar and rented out the upstairs rooms to boarders. The house was sold in 1914 by the heirs of George and Annie Bell to the Allisons, who kept it for 48 years. The home was refurbished in the early 1980s and was placed on the National Register of Historic Places on August 11, 1983. It is currently a private residence.
