= Spooner Hall =

- Spooner Hall, University of Kansas
- U.S. National Register of Historic Places
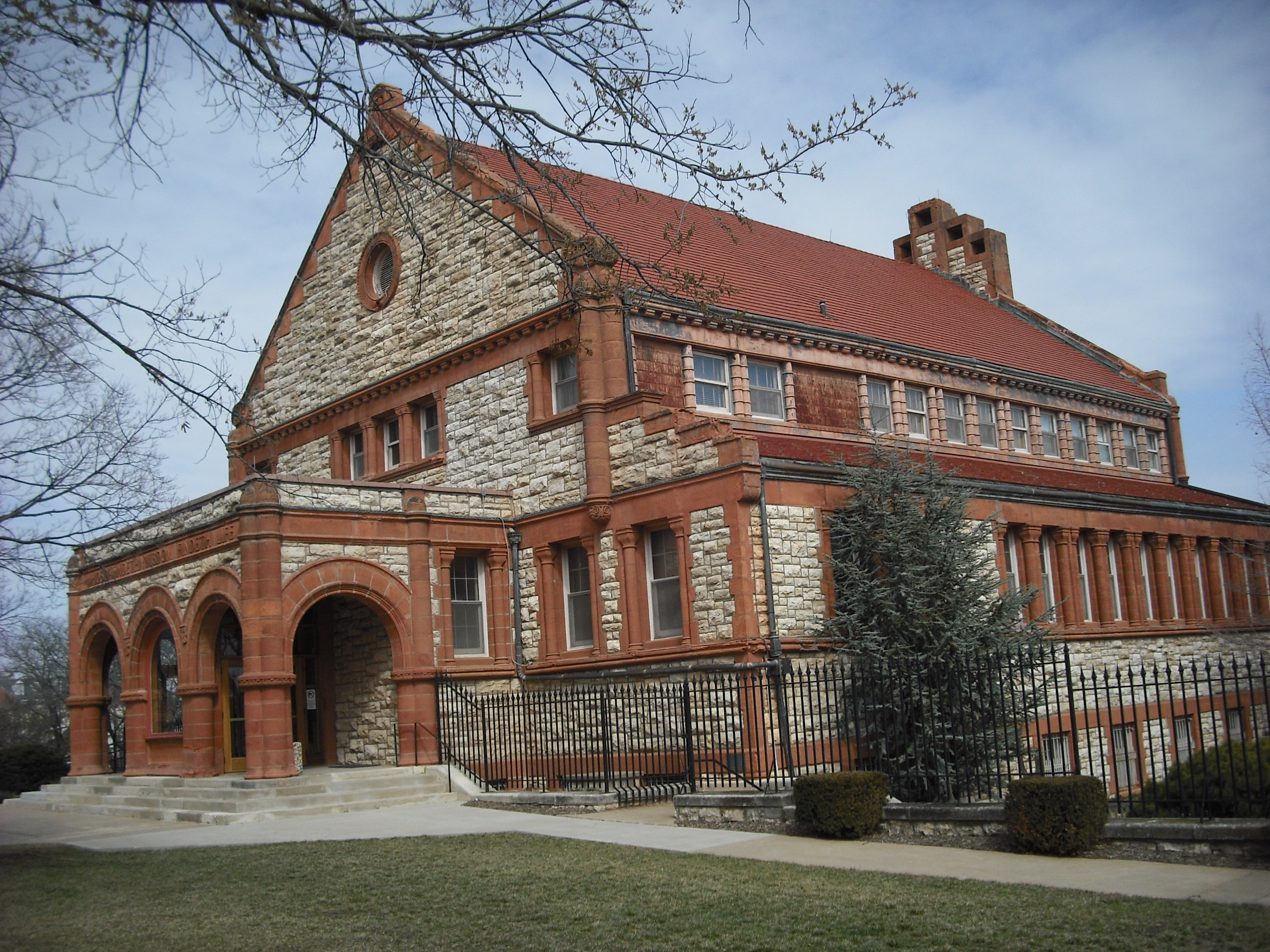

- Location within Kansas Location within the United States
- Location: 14th St. and Oread Ave. on the University of Kansas campus, Lawrence, Kansas
- Coordinates: 38°57′30″N 95°14′48″W
- Area: 1 acre (0.40 ha)
- Built: 1894
- Architect: Henry Van Brunt; John Cox
- Architectural style: Southern Romanesque Revival
- NRHP reference No.: 74000832
- Added to NRHP: July 15, 1974

Spooner Hall was built in 1893–94 as the University of Kansas' first library building. The Richardsonian Romanesque structure was designed by architect Henry Van Brunt and built with funds bequeathed by William B. Spooner, a Massachusetts leather merchant who had a family connection to the university. As originally built, the building housed a reading room on the ground floor and meeting space on the upper level, with book stacks in a five-story section.

Spooner Hall is constructed of rough-faced gray Oread Limestone blocks quarried in the immediate vicinity of Mount Oread. Red Dakota sandstone accents the quoins, columns, beltlines and sills. The roof is a steeply pitched gable with a clay tile roof covering, accented by a sculpted owl on the peak of the western gable. The original interior was completely modified for use as an art gallery.

In 1924, Spooner Hall was superseded by a new library. In 1926, the building became the Spooner-Thayer Museum of Art. Later renamed the University of Kansas Museum of Art, the collection moved into the Spencer Museum of Art in 1978. It was placed on the National Register of Historic Places on July 15, 1974. The building presently houses anthropology collections and acts as a conference center.
