= The Forgotten Law =

1922 film by James W. Horne

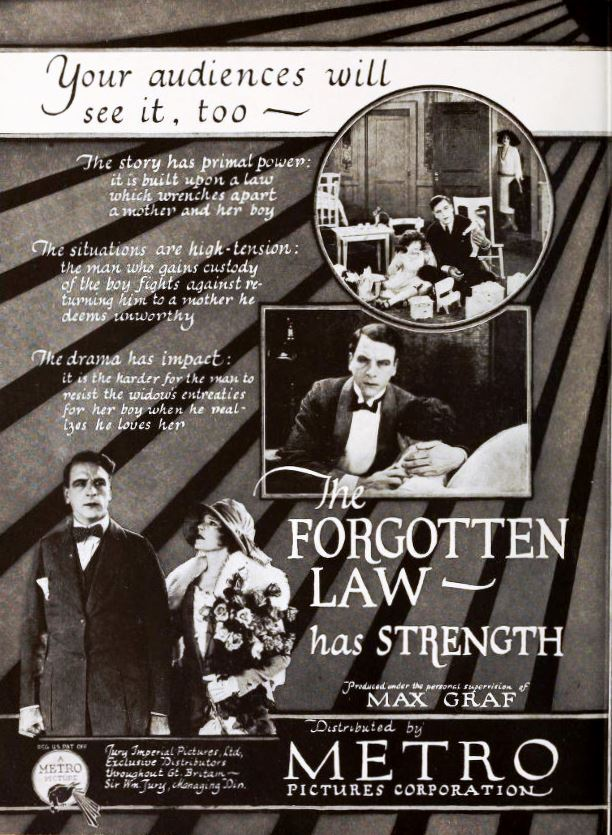
- Trade advertisement
- Directed by: James W. Horne
- Written by: Joseph Franklin Poland
- Based on: A Modern Madonna by Caroline Abbot Stanley
- Produced by: Max Graf
- Starring: Milton Sills
- Cinematography: John Stumar
- Production company: Graf Productions
- Distributed by: Metro Pictures Corporation
- Release date: November 20, 1922 (US)
- Running time: 7 reels
- Language: Silent (English intertitles)

The Forgotten Law is a 1922 American silent melodrama film starring Milton Sills and directed by James W. Horne. The story was adapted from the 1906 novel A Modern Madonna by Caroline Abbot Stanley.

It is not known whether the film currently survives.

== Cast ==
- Milton Sills as Richard Jarnette
- Jack Mulhall at Victor Jarnette
- Cleo Ridgely as Margaret
- Alec B. Francis as Judge Kirtley
- Muriel Frances Dana as Muriel
- Alice Hollister as Rosalie
- Edneh Altemus as Flo
- Lucretia Harris as Mammy Cely
- Walter Law as Detective
