= Mount Oread =

Hill in Lawrence, Kansas, U.S.

- Hogback Ridge
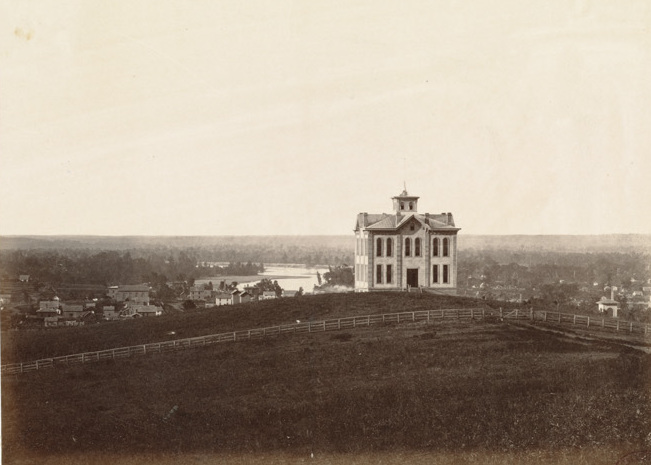
- Old North College, the first building on the University of Kansas campus, at the northeast promontory of Mount Oread, looking north over Lawrence and the Kansas River, ca. 1867

Highest point
- Elevation: 1,037 ft (316 m)
- Coordinates: 38°57′47.32″N 95°15′25.51″W

Geography
- Location within Kansas
- Location: Lawrence, Kansas, United States

Geology
- Rock age: Carboniferous

Mount Oread /ˈɔːri.æd/ is a hill in Lawrence, Kansas, upon which the University of Kansas, and parts of the city of Lawrence, Kansas, are located. It sits on the water divide between the Kansas River and the Wakarusa River. It was named after the long defunct Oread Institute in Worcester, Massachusetts, where many of the settlers of Lawrence moved from prior to the American Civil War. The hill was originally called Hogback Ridge by many Lawrence residents until the Oread name was adopted in 1864, two years after the university was founded.

For settlers going westward by wagon train on the Oregon Trail, "The Hill", as Mount Oread is now commonly referred to by Kansans, was the next big topographical challenge after crossing the Wakarusa River at Blue Jacket's Crossing, which is today located southeast of the city of Lawrence.

James Lane and Governor Charles Robinson erected a fort on the hill in the 1850s, during the Bleeding Kansas conflict in order to protect Lawrence. A 1857 Harper's Weekly report deemed the fort to be valueless as a military work. Governor Robinson's first home in Lawrence would be built on the hill, which was burned down on May 21, 1855, by pro-slavery border ruffians.

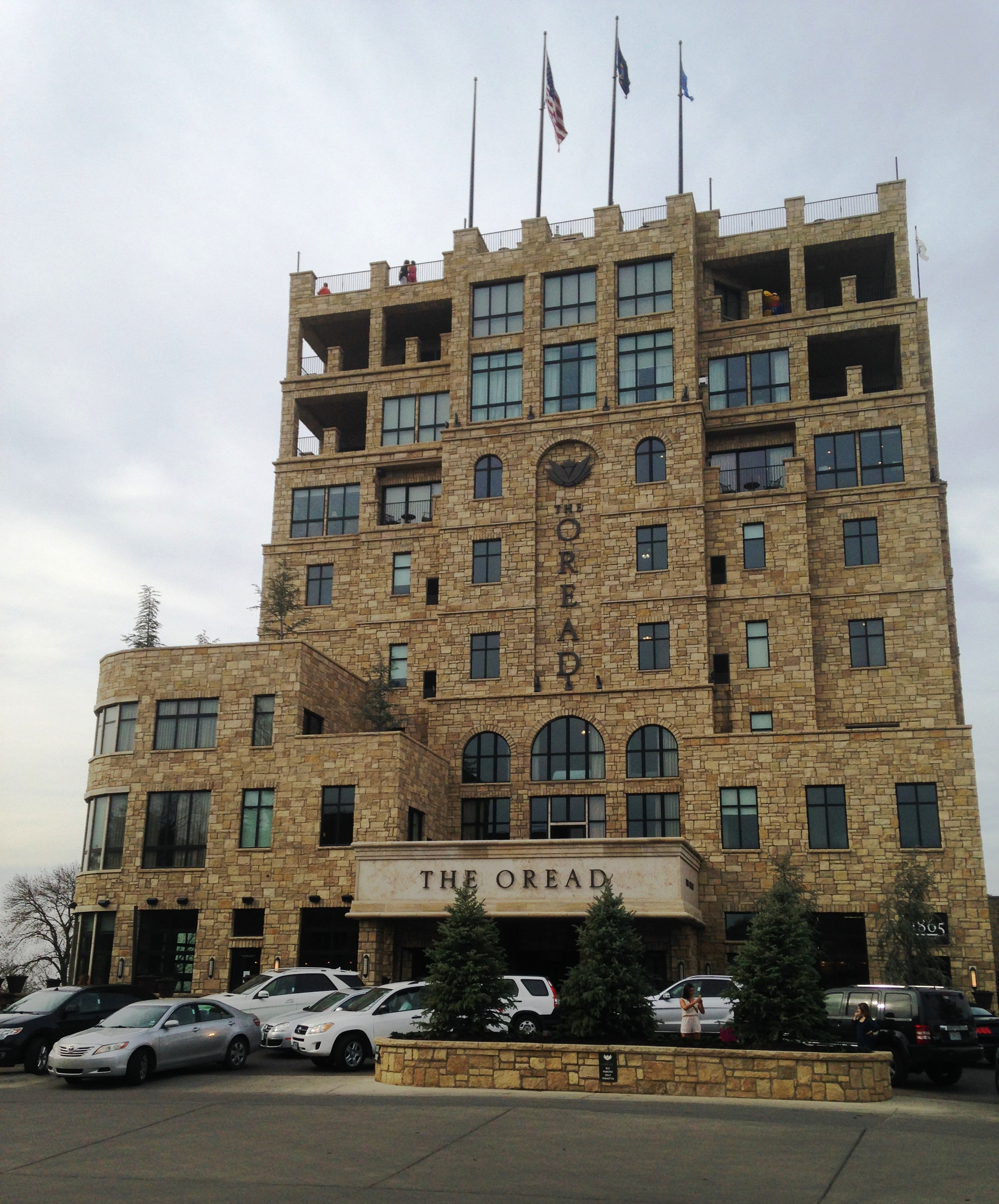
The Oread, a hotel on Mount Oread, about one block south of the Old North College site.

According to the United States Geological Survey, Mount Oread is located approximately 1,037 feet (316 m) above sea level. By way of comparison, downtown Lawrence is about 846 feet (258 m) above sea level. Mount Oread is perhaps best known for being the staging area of William Quantrill's raid into Lawrence on August 21, 1863, during the American Civil War. Presently, the campus of the University of Kansas (KU) rests on Mount Oread.

Mount Oread is the type locality for the Oread Limestone, and so, gives its name to the Oread Escarpment rising in this region of Kansas. Oread Limestone was quarried from the hilltop and used in the earliest of the campus buildings of KU, including Spooner Hall and Dyche Hall.

== See also ==
- Oread
- Mount Oread Civil War posts
