= General Order No. 11 (1863) =

Union army forced resettlement directive

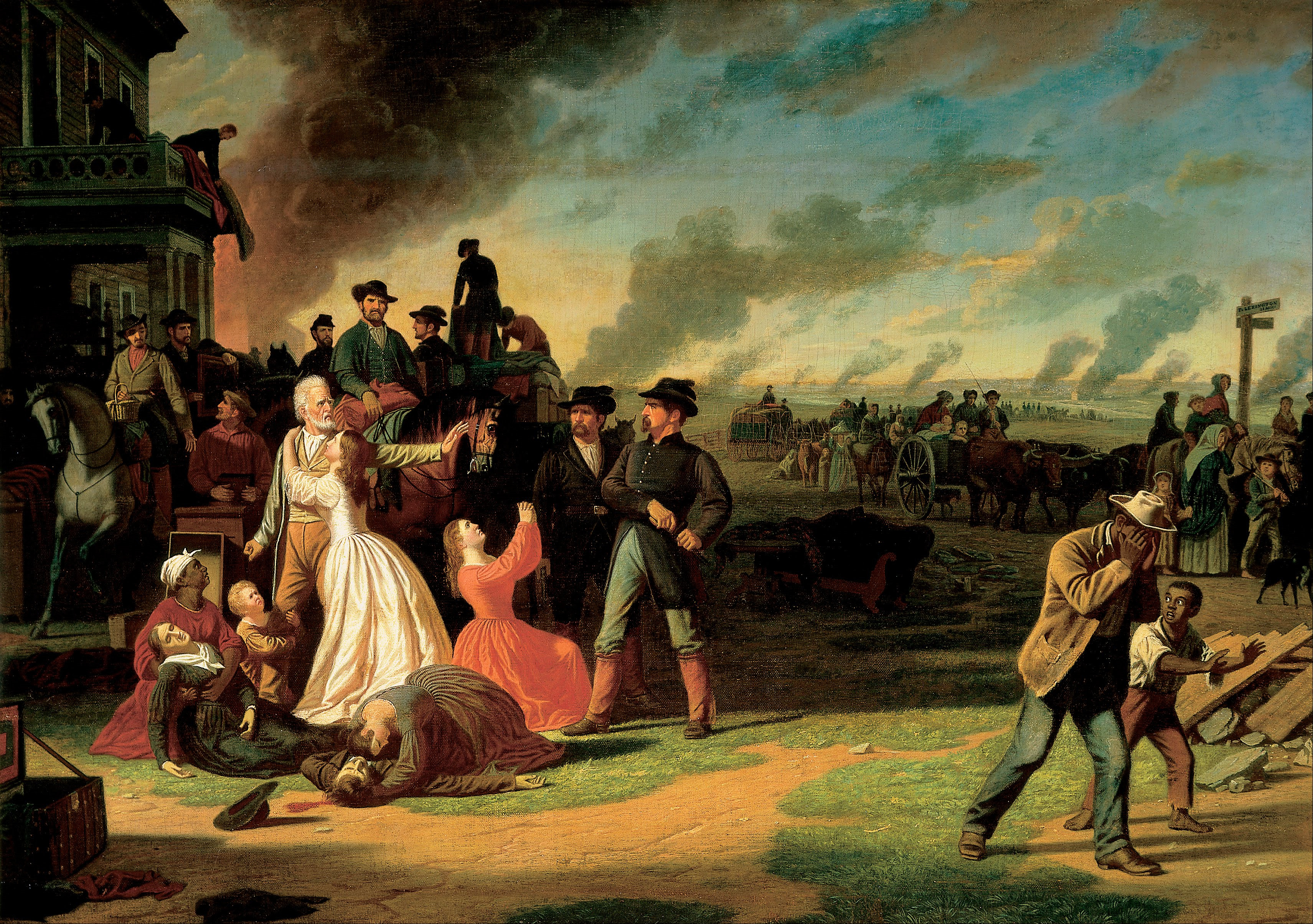
George Caleb Bingham's depiction of the execution of the General Order No. 11: Union General Thomas Ewing observes the Red Legs from behind (Order No. 11).

General Order No. 11 is the title of a Union army directive issued during the American Civil War on August 25, 1863, forcing the abandonment of rural areas in four counties in western Missouri. The order, issued by Union General Thomas Ewing, Jr., affected all rural residents regardless of their allegiance. Those who could prove their loyalty to the Union were permitted to stay in the affected area, but had to leave their farms and move to communities near military outposts (see villagization). Those who could not do so had to vacate the area altogether.

While intended to deprive pro-Confederate guerrillas of material support from the rural countryside, the severity of the order's provisions and the nature of its enforcement alienated vast numbers of civilians and ultimately led to conditions in which guerrillas were given greater support and access to supplies than before. It was repealed in January 1864, after a new general took command of Union forces in the region.

== Origin and provisions of the order ==
Order No. 11 was issued four days after the August 21 Lawrence Massacre, a retaliatory killing of men and boys led by Confederate bushwhacker leader William Quantrill. The Union army believed Quantrill's guerrillas drew their support from the rural population of four Missouri counties on the Kansas border, south of the Missouri River. These were: Bates, Cass, Jackson, and part of Vernon. Following the slaughter in Lawrence, Federal forces were determined to end such raiding and insurgency by any means necessary—no matter the cost to civilians. Hence, General Thomas Ewing, who had lost several lifelong friends in the raid, issued Order No. 11. Ewing's decree ordered the expulsion of all residents from these counties except for those living within one mile of the town limits of Independence, Hickman Mills, Pleasant Hill, and Harrisonville. The area of Kansas City, Missouri north of Brush Creek and west of the Blue River, referred to as "Big Blue" in the order, was also spared.

President Abraham Lincoln approved Ewing's order, but he cautioned that the military must take care not to permit vigilante enforcement. This warning was almost invariably ignored. Ewing had issued his order a day before he received a nearly identical directive from his superior, Major General John Schofield. Whereas Ewing's decree tried to distinguish between pro-Union and pro-Confederate civilians, Schofield's allowed no exceptions and was significantly harsher. Ewing's order was allowed to stand, and Schofield would later describe it as "wise and just; in fact, a necessity."

== Text of General Order No. 11 ==
General Order No. 11.

Headquarters District of the Border,
Kansas City, August 25, 1863.

1. All persons living in Jackson, Cass, and Bates counties, Missouri, and in that part of Vernon included in this district, except those living within one mile of the limits of Independence, Hickman's Mills, Pleasant Hill, and Harrisonville, and except those in that part of Kaw Township, Jackson County, north of Brush Creek and west of Big Blue, are hereby ordered to remove from their present places of residence within fifteen days from the date hereof.

Those who within that time establish their loyalty to the satisfaction of the commanding officer of the military station near their present place of residence will receive from him a certificate stating the fact of their loyalty, and the names of the witnesses by whom it can be shown. All who receive such certificates will be permitted to remove to any military station in this district, or to any part of the State of Kansas, except the counties of the eastern border of the State. All others shall remove out of the district. Officers commanding companies and detachments serving in the counties named will see that this paragraph is promptly obeyed.

2. All grain and hay in the field or under shelter, in the district from which inhabitants are required to remove, within reach of military stations after the 9th day of September next, will be taken to such stations and turned over to the proper officers there and report of the amount so turned over made to district headquarters, specifying the names of all loyal owners and amount of such product taken from them. All grain and hay found in such district after the 9th day of September next, not convenient to such stations, will be destroyed.

3. The provisions of General Order No. 10 from these headquarters will be at once vigorously executed by officers commanding in the parts of the district and at the station not subject to the operations of paragraph 1 of this order, and especially the towns of Independence, Westport and Kansas City.

4. Paragraph 3, General Order No. 10 is revoked as to all who have borne arms against the Government in the district since the 20th day of August, 1863.

By order of Brigadier General Ewing.

H. Hannahs, Adjt.-Gen'l.

== Implementation of the order ==
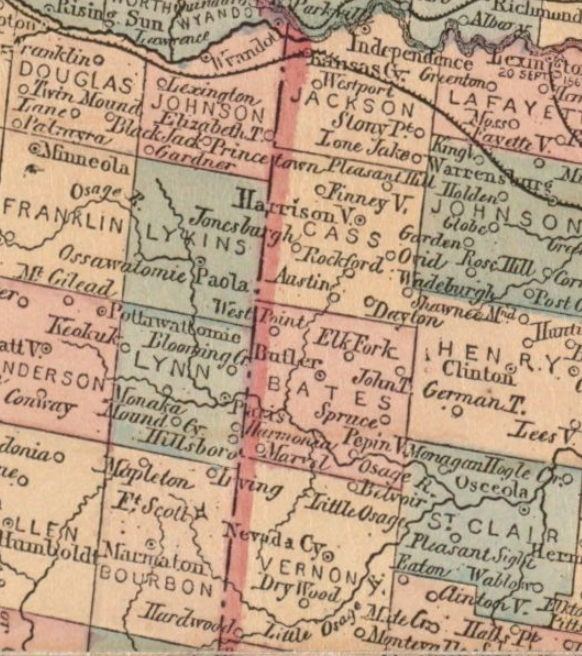
Missouri's Burnt District, Jackson, Cass, Bates and northern part of Vernon Counties, affected by General Order No. 11

Order No. 11 was not only intended to retard pro-Southern depredations, but also limit pro-Union vigilante activity, which threatened to spiral out of control, given the immense anger sweeping Kansas following Quantrill's Raid. This meant that Ewing not only had his hands full with Confederate raiders; he equally had troubles with Unionist Jayhawkers, like James Lane and "Doc" Jennison.

Convinced that Ewing was not retaliating sufficiently against Missourians, Lane threatened to lead a Kansas force into Missouri, laying waste to the four counties named in Ewing's decree, and more. On September 9, 1863, Lane gathered nearly a thousand Kansans at Paola, Kansas, and marched towards Westport, Missouri, with an eye towards destruction of that pro-slavery town. Ewing sent several companies of his old Eleventh Kansas Infantry (now mounted as cavalry) to stop Lane's advance, forcefully, if necessary. Faced with this superior Federal force, Lane ultimately backed down.

Order No. 11 was partially intended to punish Missourians with pro-rebel sympathies, however many residents of the four counties named in Ewing's orders were pro-Union or neutralist in sentiment. In reality, the Union troops acted with little deliberation; farm animals were killed, and house property was destroyed or stolen; houses, barns and outbuildings were burned to the ground. Some civilians were summarily executed—a few as old as seventy years of age.

Ewing's four counties, Jackson, Cass, Bates and northern part of Vernon, became a devastated "no man's land," with only charred chimneys (soon nicknamed "Jennison's tombstones", after "Doc" Jennison) and burnt stubble showing where homes and thriving communities had once stood, earning the sobriquet, "The Burnt District." Historian Christopher Philips writes, "The resulting population displacement and destruction of property (lest it fall into rebel hands) prompted the nickname "Burnt District," as an apt description of the region." There are very few remaining antebellum homes in this area due to the Order No. 11.

Ewing wanted to demonstrate that the Union forces intended to act forcefully against Quantrill and other bushwhackers, thus rendering vigilante actions (such as the one contemplated by Lane) unnecessary—and thereby preventing their occurrence, which Ewing was determined at all costs to do. He ordered his troops not to engage in looting or other depredations, but he was ultimately unable to control them. Most of the troops were Kansas volunteers, who regarded all of the inhabitants of the affected counties as rebels with property subject to military confiscation.

Although Federal troops ultimately burned most of the outlying farms and houses, they were unable to prevent Confederates from initially acquiring vast amounts of food and other useful material from abandoned dwellings. Ewing's order had the opposite military effect from what he intended: instead of eliminating the guerrillas, it gave them immediate and practically unlimited access to supplies. For instance, the bushwhackers were able to help themselves to abandoned chickens, hogs and cattle, all of which had been left behind when their owners were forced to flee. Smokehouses were sometimes found to contain hams and bacon, while barns often held feed for horses.

== Repeal and legacy of the order ==
Ewing eased his order in November, issuing General Order No. 20, which permitted the return of those who could prove their loyalty to the Union. In January 1864, command over the border counties passed to General Egbert Brown, who disapproved of Order No. 11. He almost immediately replaced it with a new directive, one that allowed anyone who would take an oath of allegiance to the Union to return and rebuild their homes.

Ewing's controversial order greatly disrupted the lives of thousands of civilians, most of whom were innocent of any guerrilla collaboration. The evidence is not conclusive whether Order No. 11 seriously hindered Confederate military operations. No raids into Kansas took place after its issuance, but historian Albert Castel credits this not to Order No. 11, but rather to strengthened border defenses and a better organized Home Guard, plus a guerrilla focus on operations in northern and central Missouri in preparation for General Sterling Price's 1864 invasion.

The infamous destruction and hatred inspired by Ewing's Order No. 11 would persist throughout western Missouri for many decades as the affected counties slowly tried to recover.

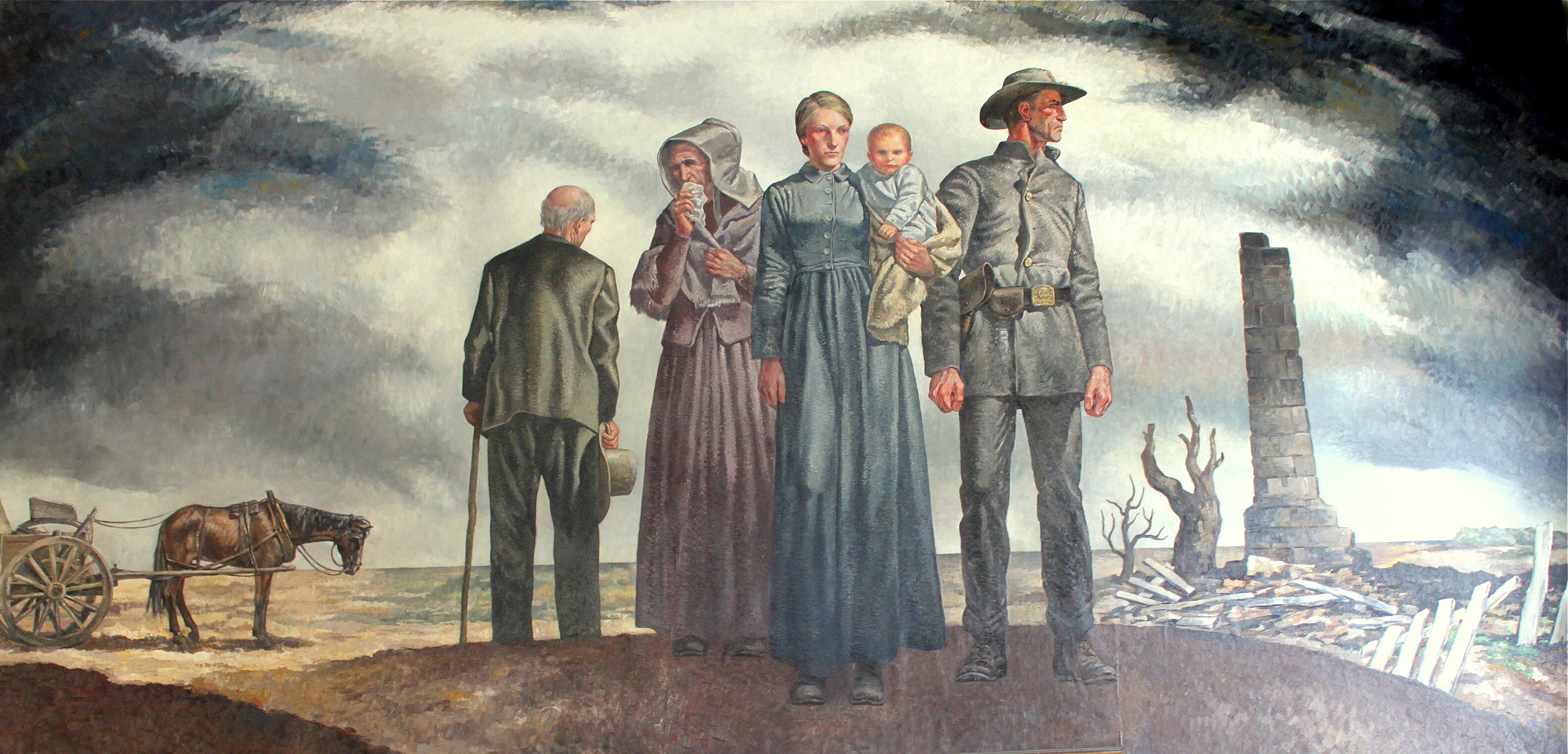
Back Home, April 1865, by Thomas C. Lea III, Pleasant Hill Post Office Mural

Author Caroline Abbot Stanley's 1904 Order No. 11 is based on the events surrounding the order.

== George Bingham and Order No. 11 ==
American artist George Caleb Bingham, who was a Conservative Unionist and bitter enemy of Ewing, called Order No. 11 an "act of imbecility" and wrote letters protesting it. Bingham wrote to Gen. Ewing, "If you execute this order, I shall make you infamous with pen and brush," and in 1868 created his famous painting reflecting the consequences of Ewing's harsh edict (see above). Guerrilla Frank James, a participant in the terroristic Lawrence Massacre, is said to have commented: "This is a picture that talks." Historian Albert Castel described it as "mediocre art but excellent propaganda."

Bingham, who was in Kansas City at the time, described the events:

It is well-known that men were shot down in the very act of obeying the order, and their wagons and effects seized by their murderers. Large trains of wagons, extending over the prairies for miles in length, and moving Kansasward, were freighted with every description of household furniture and wearing apparel belonging to the exiled inhabitants. Dense columns of smoke arising in every direction marked the conflagrations of dwellings, many of the evidences of which are yet to be seen in the remains of seared and blackened chimneys, standing as melancholy monuments of a ruthless military despotism which spared neither age, sex, character, nor condition. There was neither aid nor protection afforded to the banished inhabitants by the heartless authority which expelled them from their rightful possessions. They crowded by hundreds upon the banks of the Missouri River, and were indebted to the charity of benevolent steamboat conductors for transportation to places of safety where friendly aid could be extended to them without danger to those who ventured to contribute it.

Bingham insisted that the real culprits behind most of the depredations committed in western Missouri and eastern Kansas were not the pro-Confederate bushwhackers, but rather pro-Union Jayhawkers and "Red Legs," whom he accused of operating under the protection of General Ewing himself. The Red Legs were a paramilitary group wearing red gaiters and numbered around 100 that served as scouts during the punitive expedition of the Union troops in Missouri; they were accused by contemporaries in spreading atrocities and destruction.

According to Bingham, Union troops might easily have defeated the Bushwhackers if they had tried hard enough, and exercised a requisite amount of personal courage. However, Albert E. Castel refutes Bingham's assertions, demonstrating in his publications that Ewing made conspicuous efforts to rein in the Jayhawkers, and to stop the violence on both sides. He furthermore argues that Ewing issued Order No. 11 at least partly in a desperate attempt to stop a planned Unionist raid on Missouri intended to exact revenge for the Lawrence massacre, to be led by Kansas Senator Jim Lane himself (see above).

Further scholarship indicates that although Bingham's son used the painting in 1880 to attack Ewing when he ran for Governor of Ohio, it did not prove to be the deciding influence in Ewing's narrow loss. President Rutherford Hayes, a Ewing family friend but political opponent of Ewing's campaign, urged Ohio Republicans not to use the painting as it would show Ewing's strong war record against the South, which was contrary to his effort to show Ewing as a weak business leader, and a repudiationist on hard money/soft money issues. This more recent scholarship reviews Ohio newspaper accounts of the 1880 campaign, and indicates Ewing, running as a Democrat, faced significant third-party challenges, and was trying to oust the Republicans during a time of economic prosperity—always a difficult political task, at best.

== See also ==
- Scorched earth
- Total war
