= Lawrence Massacre =

Raid in the American Civil War

- Part of the American Civil War
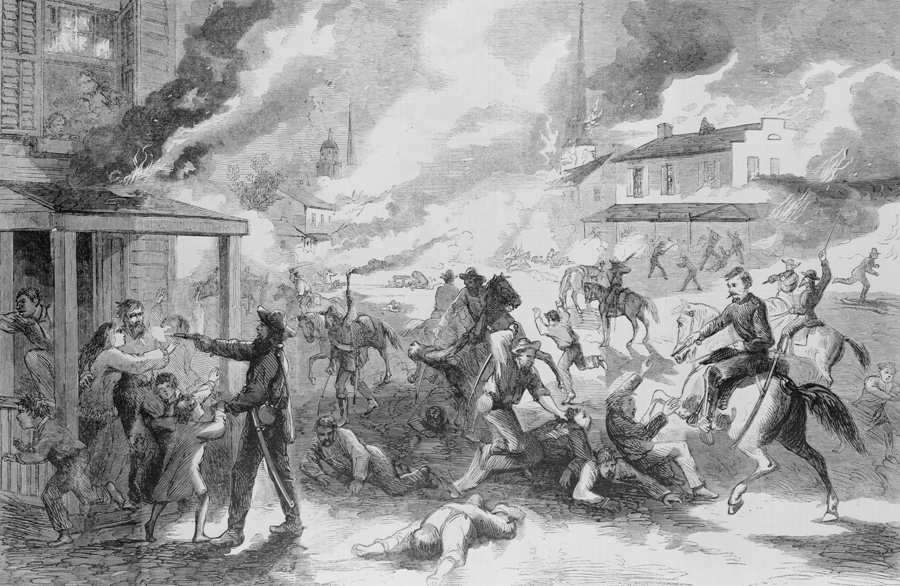
- An artist's depiction of the destruction of the city of Lawrence, Kansas, and the massacre of its inhabitants by Confederate guerrillas on August 21, 1863
- Location: 38°58′22″N 95°14′10″W; Lawrence, Douglas County, Kansas
- Date: August 21, 1863
- Deaths: 164 (plus 1 Confederate raider)
- Victims: Civilian population of Lawrence; Unmustered Union recruits
- Perpetrators: Confederate States Army: Quantrill's Raiders; William C. Quantrill
- Assailant: 300–400 raiders
- Motive: Revenge for Sacking of Osceola

The Lawrence Massacre (also known as Quantrill's Raid) was an attack during the American Civil War (1861–65) by Quantrill's Raiders, a Confederate guerrilla group led by William Quantrill, on the Unionist town of Lawrence, Kansas, killing around 150 men and boys.

The attack, on the morning of Friday August 21, 1863, targeted Lawrence due to the town's long support of abolition and its reputation as a center for the Jayhawkers, who were free-state militia and vigilante groups known for attacking plantations in pro-slavery Missouri's western counties.

== Background ==
By 1863, Kansas had long been the center of strife and warfare over the admission of slave states versus free states.

In the summer of 1856, the first sacking of Lawrence sparked a guerrilla war in Kansas that lasted for years. John Brown might be the best-known participant in the violence of the late 1850s, participating on the abolitionist or Jayhawker side, but numerous groups fought for each side during the "Bleeding Kansas" period.

By the beginning of the American Civil War, Lawrence was already a target for pro-slavery ire, having been seen as the anti-slavery stronghold in the state and, more importantly, a staging area for Unionist and Jayhawker incursions into Missouri. Initially, the town and surrounding area were extremely vigilant and reacted strongly to rumors that enemy forces might be advancing on the town. By the summer of 1863, none of the threats had materialized, so citizen fears had declined, and defense preparations were relaxed.

== Motivations ==
=== Retaliation for Jayhawker attacks ===
Lawrence was a headquarters for a band of Jayhawkers (sometimes called "Red Legs"), who had initiated a campaign in late March 1863 with the purported objective to eliminate civilian support for the Confederate guerrillas. In describing the activities of these soldiers, U.S. Army General Blunt stated,

A reign of terror was inaugurated, and no man's property was safe, nor was his life worth much if he opposed them in their schemes of plunder and robbery.

Many Jayhawker leaders like Charles "Doc" Jennison, James Montgomery, and George Henry Hoyt terrorized Western Missouri, angering both pro-slavery and anti-slavery civilians and politicians alike. The historian Albert Castel thus concludes that revenge was the primary motive, followed by a desire to plunder.

The survivors confirmed the retaliatory nature of the attack on Lawrence. According to Castel,

The universal testimony of all the ladies and others who talked with the butchers of the 21st ult. is that these demons claimed they were here to revenge the wrongs done their families by our men under Lane, Jennison, Anthony and Co.

Charles L. Robinson, the first governor of Kansas and an eyewitness to the raid, also characterized the attack as an act of vengeance:

Before this raid the entire border counties of Missouri had experienced more terrible outrages than ever the Quantrill raid at Lawrence... There was no burning of feet and torture by hanging in Lawrence as there was in Missouri, neither were women and children outraged.

Robinson explained that Quantrill targeted Lawrence because Jayhawkers had attacked Missouri "as soon as war broke out" and Lawrence was "headquarters for the thieves and their plunder."

Quantrill said his motivation for the attack was "to plunder, and destroy the town in retaliation for Osceola." That was a reference to the Union's attack on Osceola, Missouri in September 1861, led by Senator James H. Lane. Osceola was plundered, and nine men were given a drumhead court-martial trial and executed.

=== Collapse of the Women's Prison in Kansas City ===
The collapse of the Women's Prison in Kansas City is also often believed to have inspired some to join in on the attack. In a bid to put down the Missouri guerrilla raiders operating in Kansas, General Thomas Ewing, Jr. issued in April 1863 "General Order No. 10," which ordered the arrest of anyone giving aid or comfort to Confederate guerrillas. This meant chiefly women or girls who were relatives of the guerrillas. Ewing confined those arrested in makeshift prisons in Kansas City. The women were sequentially housed in two buildings which were considered either too small or too unsanitary, before being moved to an empty property at 1425 Grand. This structure was part of the estate of the deceased Robert S. Thomas, George Caleb Bingham's father-in-law. In 1861 Bingham and his family were living in the structure, but in early 1862 after being appointed treasurer of the state of Missouri, he and his family relocated to Jefferson City. Bingham had added a third story to the existing structure to use as a studio.

At least ten women or girls, all under the age of 20, were incarcerated in the building when it collapsed on August 13, 1863, killing four: Charity McCorkle Kerr, Susan Crawford Vandever, Armenia Crawford Selvey, and Josephine Anderson—the 15-year-old sister of William T. "Bloody Bill" Anderson. A few days later, Nannie Harris died from her wounds. Survivors of the collapse included Jenny Anderson (crippled by the accident), Susan Anne Mundy Womacks, Martha "Mattie" Mundy, Lucinda "Lou" Mundy Gray, Elizabeth Harris (later married to Deal), and Mollie Grindstaff. Anderson's 13-year-old sister, who was shackled to a ball-and-chain inside the jail, suffered multiple injuries including two broken legs. Rumors circulated (later promulgated by Bingham who held a personal grudge against Ewing and who would seek financial compensation for the loss of the building) that the guards undermined the structure to cause its collapse. A 1995 study of the events and affidavits surrounding the collapse concludes this is "the least plausible of the theories." Instead, testimony indicated that alterations to the first floor of the adjoining Cockrell structure for use as a barracks caused the common wall to buckle. The weight of the third story on the former Bingham residence contributed to the resultant collapse.

Even before the collapse of the jail, the arrest and planned deportation of the girls had enraged Quantrill's guerrillas; George Todd left a note for General Ewing threatening to burn Kansas City unless the girls were freed. While Quantrill's raid on Lawrence was planned before the collapse of the jail, the deaths of the guerrillas' female relatives undoubtedly added to their thirst for revenge and blood lust during the raid.

== Attack ==
The attack was the product of careful planning. Quantrill had gained the confidence of many of the leaders of independent Bushwhacker groups and chose the day and time of the attack well in advance. Different Missouri rider groups approached Lawrence from the east in several independent columns. They converged with well-timed precision in the final miles before Lawrence during the pre-dawn hours of the chosen day. Many of the men had been riding for over 24 hours to make the rendezvous and had lashed themselves to their saddles to keep riding if they fell asleep. Almost all were armed with multiple six-shot revolvers.

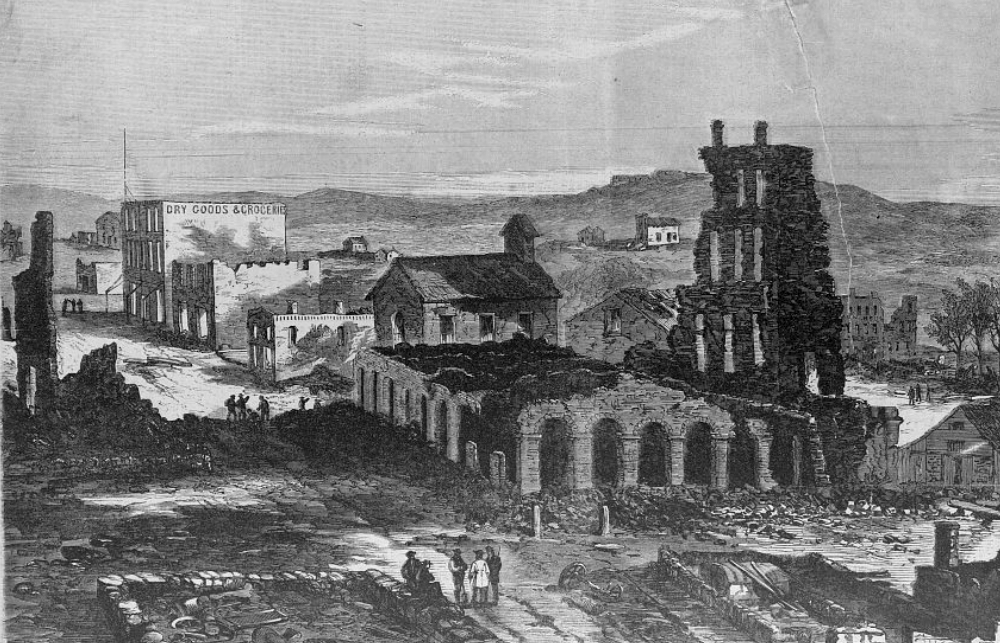
Lawrence in ruins as illustrated in Harper's Weekly. The charred remains of the Eldridge House are in the foreground.

Henry Thompson, a black servant from Hesper, attempted to run on foot to Lawrence to warn the town of hundreds of raiders making their way toward Lawrence. Thompson made it as far as Eudora, Kansas before stopping from exhaustion. An unidentified man riding a chaise nearby rode by to ask Thompson if he needed help. Thompson replied that he had run from Hesper and needed to warn Lawrence. While Thompson and the man on the chaise were able to gather some Eudorans to ride into Lawrence to warn the city to the west, none of them made it in time.

Around 450 guerrillas arrived on the outskirts of Lawrence shortly after 5 a.m. A small squad was dispatched to the summit of Mount Oread to serve as lookouts, and the remainder rode into town. One of the first deaths was the pastor and lieutenant of the 2nd Kansas Colored Regiment, Samuel S. Snyder, who was outside milking his cows when he was shot by the passing raiders, who were making their way into town. Snyder's death was witnessed by his longtime friend Reverend Hugh Fisher. Their initial focus was the Eldridge House, a large brick hotel in the heart of Lawrence. After gaining control of the building (which then served as Quantrill's headquarters during the raid), Quantrill's force broke into smaller groups that fanned out throughout the town. Over four hours, the raiders pillaged and burned a quarter of the buildings in Lawrence, including all but two businesses. They looted most of the banks and stores in town and killed over 150 people, all of them men and boys. According to an 1897 account, among the dead, were 18 of 23 unmustered army recruits. By 9 a.m., the raiders were on their way out of town, evading the few units that came in pursuit, and eventually splitting up to avoid Union pursuit of a unified column into Missouri.

Some families attempted to make the run towards Mount Oread in a last-ditch flight for safety.

The raid was less of a battle and more of a mass execution. Two weeks before the attack, a Lawrence newspaper had boasted, "Lawrence has ready for any emergency over five hundred fighting men...every one of who would like to see [Quantrill's raiders]". However, a squad of soldiers temporarily stationed in Lawrence had returned to Fort Leavenworth, and due to the surprise, swiftness, and fury of the initial assault, the local militia was unable to assemble and mount a defense. Most of those Quantrill and his raiders killed were not carrying any weapon. Before the Lawrence Massacre, a previous attack on Lawrence, the Sacking of Lawrence, saw the pro-slavery attackers, led by Samuel J. Jones, a pro-slavery Missourian who served as Sheriff of Douglas County, demanding that the citizens of Lawrence give up their firearms to the raiders. Many citizens initially refused, but by the end of the sacking itself, many in Lawrence were left without a weapon of any sort, which, along with the swiftness of the Lawrence Massacre later on, saw Lawrence left defenseless against the attack.

Because revenge was a principal motive for the attack, Quantrill's raiders entered Lawrence with lists of men to be killed and buildings to be burned. Senator James H. Lane was at the top of the list. Lane was a military leader and chief political proponent of the jayhawking raids that had cut a swath of death, plundering, and arson through western Missouri (including the destruction of Osceola) in the early months of the Civil War. Lane escaped death by racing through a cornfield in his nightshirt. John Speer, whom Lane had put into the newspaper business, was one of Lane's chief political backers and was also on the list. Speer likewise escaped execution, but two of his sons were killed in the raid. (One of Speer's sons may have been the same John L. Speer that appeared on a list of Red Legs previously issued by the Union military.) Speer's youngest son, 15-year-old Billy, may have been included on the death lists, but Quantrill's men released him after he gave them a false name. (Billy Speer later shot one of the raiders during their exit from Lawrence, causing one of the few casualties among Quantrill's command while in Lawrence.) Charles L. Robinson, first governor of Kansas and a prominent abolitionist, may also have been on the list, although he was not killed. This according to Richard Cordley, a minister in Lawrence and a survivor of the attack:

Ex-Governor Charles Robinson was an object of special search among them. He was one of the men they particularly wanted. During the whole time they were in town he was in his large stone barn on the hillside. He had just gone to the barn to get his team to drive out into the country, when he saw them come in and saw them make their first charge. He concluded to remain where he was. The barn overlooked the whole town, and he saw the affair from beginning to end. Gangs of raiders came by several times and looked at the barn and went round it, but it looked so much like a fort, that they kept out of range.

Cordley was also on the list of men Quantrill wanted to kill. In some of his writings, Quantrill later lamented that he did not kill Cordley, "The Abolition Preacher."

While many of the victims had been specifically targeted beforehand, executions were more indiscriminate among segments of the raiders, particularly Todd's band that operated in the western part of Lawrence. The men and boys riding with "Bloody Bill" Anderson also accounted for a disproportionate number of the Lawrence dead. The raid devolved into extreme brutality; according to witnesses, the raiders murdered a group of men and their sons who had surrendered under assurances of safety, murdered a father who was in a field with his son, shot a defenseless man who was lying sick in bed, killed an injured man who was being held by his pleading wife, and bound a pair of men and forced them into a burning building where they slowly burned to death. Another dramatic story was told in a letter written on September 7, 1863, by H.M. Simpson, whose entire family narrowly escaped death by hiding in a nearby cornfield as the massacre raged all around them:

My father was very slow to get into the cornfield. He was so indignant at the ruffians that he was unwilling to retreat before them. My little children were in the field three hours. They seemed to know that if they cried the noise would betray their parents whereabouts, and so they kept as still as mice. The baby was very hungry & I gave her an ear of raw green corn which she ate ravenously.

Many have characterized Quantrill's decision to kill young boys alongside adult men as a particularly reprehensible aspect of the raid. Bobbie Martin is generally cited as being the youngest victim; some histories of the raid state he could have been as young as ten to twelve years old, while others state he was fourteen. Most accounts state he was wearing a Union soldier uniform or clothing made from his father's uniform; some state he was carrying a musket and cartridges. (For perspective on the age of participants in the conflict, it has been estimated that about 800,000 Union soldiers were seventeen years of age or younger, with about 100,000 of those being fifteen or younger.) Most of Quantrill's guerrilla fighters were teenagers. One of the youngest was Riley Crawford, who was 13 when taken by his mother to Quantrill after her husband was shot and her home burned by Union soldiers.

== Aftermath ==
Once the confederates withdrew to the southeast, Lane led a small group of survivors of the massacre in pursuit of Quantrill's men and was joined by a force of about 200 U.S. Army cavalrymen, commanded by Major Preston B. Plumb. They overtook the raiders south of the town of Brooklyn, Kansas and fought the first of several engagements, beginning with the Skirmish near Brooklyn, Kansas.

The Lawrence massacre was one of the bloodiest events in the history of Kansas. The Plymouth Congregational Church in Lawrence survived the attack, but a number of its members were killed and records destroyed. Cordley, the pastor at Plymouth, said to his congregation a few days after the attack, "My friends, Lawrence may seem dead, but she will rise again in a more glorious resurrection. Our ranks have been thinned by death, but let us 'close-up' and hold the ground [of Kansas]. The conflict may not be ended, but the victory must be ours. We may perish but the principles for which we contend will live."

A day after the attack, some of the surviving citizens of Lawrence lynched a member of Quantrill's Raiders who was caught in the town. On August 25, General Ewing authorized General Order No. 11 (not to be confused with General Ulysses S. Grant's General Order of the same name) evicting thousands of Missourians in four counties from their homes near the Kansas border. Virtually everything in these counties was then systematically burned to the ground. The action was carried out by the Jayhawker, Charles "Doc" Jennison. Jennison's raids into Missouri were thorough and indiscriminate. They left four counties in western Missouri wasted, save for the standing brick chimneys of the two-story period houses, which are still called "Jennison Monuments" in those parts.

George Miller, a Missouri abolitionist and preacher, described the role of the Lawrence Massacre in the region's descent into the horror of total war on the civilian populations of both eastern Kansas and western Missouri:

Viewed in any light, the Lawrence Raid will continue to be held, as the most infamous event of the uncivil war! The work of destruction did not stop in Kansas. The cowardly criminality of this spiteful reciprocity lay in the fact that each party knew, but did not care, that the consequences of their violent acts would fall most heavily upon their own helpless friends. Jenison in 1861 rushed into Missouri when there was no one to resist, and robbed and killed and sneaked away with his spoils and left the union people of Missouri to bear the vengeance of his crimes. Quantrell [sic] in 1863 rushed into Lawrence, Kansas, when there was no danger, and killed and robbed and sneaked off with his spoils, leaving helpless women and children of his own side to bear the dreadful vengeance invoked by that raid. So the Lawrence raid was followed by swift and cruel retribution, falling, as usual in this border warfare, upon the innocent and helpless, rather than the guilty ones. Quantrell [sic] left Kansas with the loss of one man. The Kansas troops followed him, at a respectful distance, and visited dire vengeance on all western Missouri. Unarmed old men and boys were accused and shot down, and homes with their now meagre comforts were burned, and helpless women and children turned out with no provision for the approaching winter. The number of those killed was never reported, as they were scattered all over western Missouri.

After the attack, Quantrill led his men south to Texas for the winter. By the next year, the raiders had disintegrated as a unified force and could not achieve similar successes. Quantrill died of wounds he received in Kentucky in 1865, with only a few staunch supporters left. Among those who remained by his side were Frank James and his younger brother, Jesse James.

After Quantrill's attack, the U.S. Army erected several military posts on Mount Oread, including Camp Ewing, Camp Lookout, and Fort Ulysses, to keep guard over the rebuilt city. No further attacks were made on Lawrence, and these installations were eventually abandoned and dismantled after the war.

== In popular culture ==
- The 1940 film Dark Command, based on a novel of the same name, is a fictionalized account of the events presented in classic B-movie western style. The film bore no resemblance to the events of history.
- The battle is depicted in the Audie Murphy western Kansas Raiders (1950), in Ang Lee's 1999 film Ride with the Devil, and in the Steven Spielberg-produced 2005 miniseries Into the West.
- The 1968 movie Bandolero! references the event.
- There is a section in Charles Portis's 1968 book, True Grit in which the characters Marshal Rooster Cogburn and Texas Ranger LaBoeuf argue about Quantrill. LaBoeuf calls him a murderer; Cogburn, who "rode with" Quantrill, calls him a patriot. LaBoeuf ends the argument after Cogburn refers to "Captain Quantrill," ridiculing the title: "Captain of what?" This conversation later appeared in the 1969 and 2010 films.
- The 1979 TV movie The Legend of the Golden Gun was about chasing down Quantrill.
- The Lawrence massacre is a central episode in Wildwood Boys (2000), a biographical novel about Bloody Bill Anderson by James Carlos Blake.
- In the "Weekend Warriors" episode of Psych (season 1, episode 6, originally aired August 11, 2006) the murder of the person playing Quantrill in a reenactment of the massacre is the episode's focus.
- Chuck Mead's "The Devil by Their Side" (2014), on his album Free State Serenade (2014), depicts the event.

== See also ==
- Bushwhacking a form of guerrilla warfare common during the American Revolutionary War, American Civil War
- George and Annie Bell House
- List of battles fought in Kansas
- List of massacres in Kansas
