= Ruskin High School (Kansas City, Missouri) =

Location
- 7000 E. 111th St; Kansas City, Missouri; United States
- Coordinates: 38°55′25″N 94°30′24″W

Information
- Type: Public Secondary
- Established: 1929, 1959 (rebuilt)
- School district: Hickman Mills C-1 School District
- Principal: Ernest Fields
- Teaching staff: 99.44 (FTE)
- Grades: 9–12
- Enrollment: 1,299 (2024-2025)
- Student to teacher ratio: 13.06
- Campus: Urban
- Colors: Blue and gold
- Athletics: basketball, track, football, softball, baseball, soccer
- Mascot: Golden Eagles
- Nickname: Battle Ground
- Rival: Grandview
- Website: www.hickmanmills.org/ruskin

Ruskin High School is located in the southern part of Kansas City, Missouri, United States and is within the Hickman Mills C-1 School District. Ruskin High School's sports teams are called the Golden Eagles.

== History ==
Ruskin High School had its first graduating class in 1930.

In August 2010, former Hickman Mills students merged with the Ruskin student body and became the Ruskin Academy of Engineering.

== Notable alumni ==
- Aireontae Ersery, college football offensive tackle for the Minnesota Golden Gophers
- Esian Henderson, an American professional basketball player
- Edward D. “Chip” Robertson, Jr., former Chief of Missouri Supreme Court
