= Mount Oread Civil War posts =

Fort Ulysses / Camp Ewing
- Mount Oread, Lawrence, Kansas
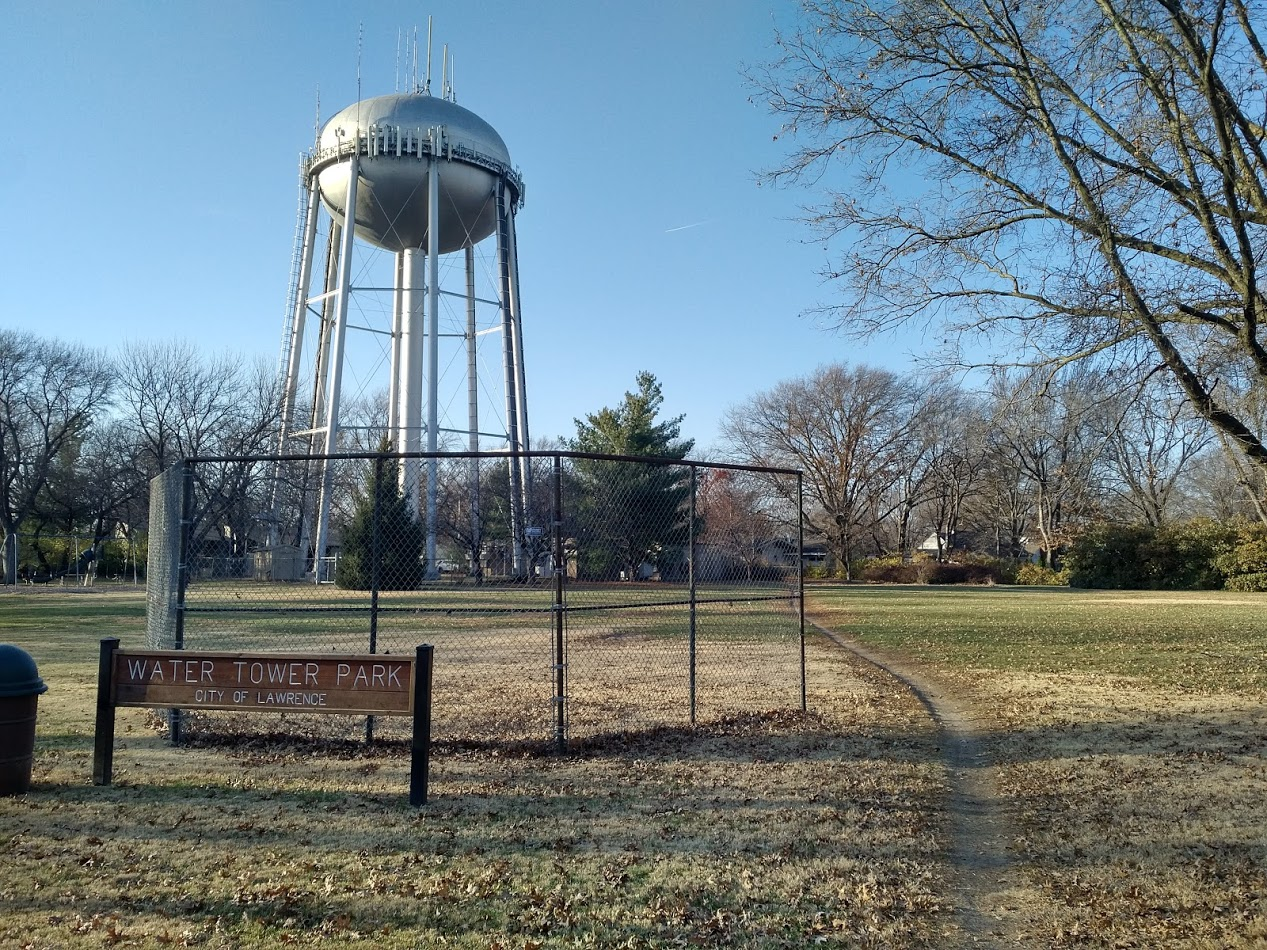
- Watertower Park on top of Mount Oread, site of the former Civil War installations

Site information
- Type: Military camp and earthwork fortification

Location
- Coordinates: 38°57′47″N 95°15′26″W

Site history
- Built: 1864
- Built by: Union Army; citizens of Lawrence
- In use: 1864–1865
- Fate: Abandoned after end of Civil War

Lawrence, Kansas was not well defended in the early part of the Civil War. That ended with William Quantrill's devastating guerrilla raid August 21, 1863. By early 1864 Union soldiers were permanently camped on the top and slopes of Mount Oread, then to Lawrence's southwest. It seems the camp was originally named Camp Ewing, after Brig. Gen. Thomas Ewing.

Soon a battery of cannon was placed on the top of Mount Oread and in July 1864 construction began on Fort Ulysses, also on Mount Oread. The citizens of Lawrence helped in the fort's construction. Its date of completion is unknown, although it was still under construction in December. It is very possible it was never finished.

The advance of Confederate Maj. Gen. Sterling Price in Missouri in October 1864 brought an urgency to efforts to protect Lawrence. The town was placed under martial law and a large guard detail protected the town each night. On October 18 the provost marshal at Lawrence decreed all businesses in Lawrence were to remain open only five hours a day. The situation returned to normal once Price was defeated at the Battle of Westport on October 23 and had to retreat back south.

The military complex on Mount Oread was used until the end of the Civil War. With the War's end the usefulness of the installations ceased and they were soon abandoned.
