= Jim Lane (politician) =

American politician and military officer (1814–1866)

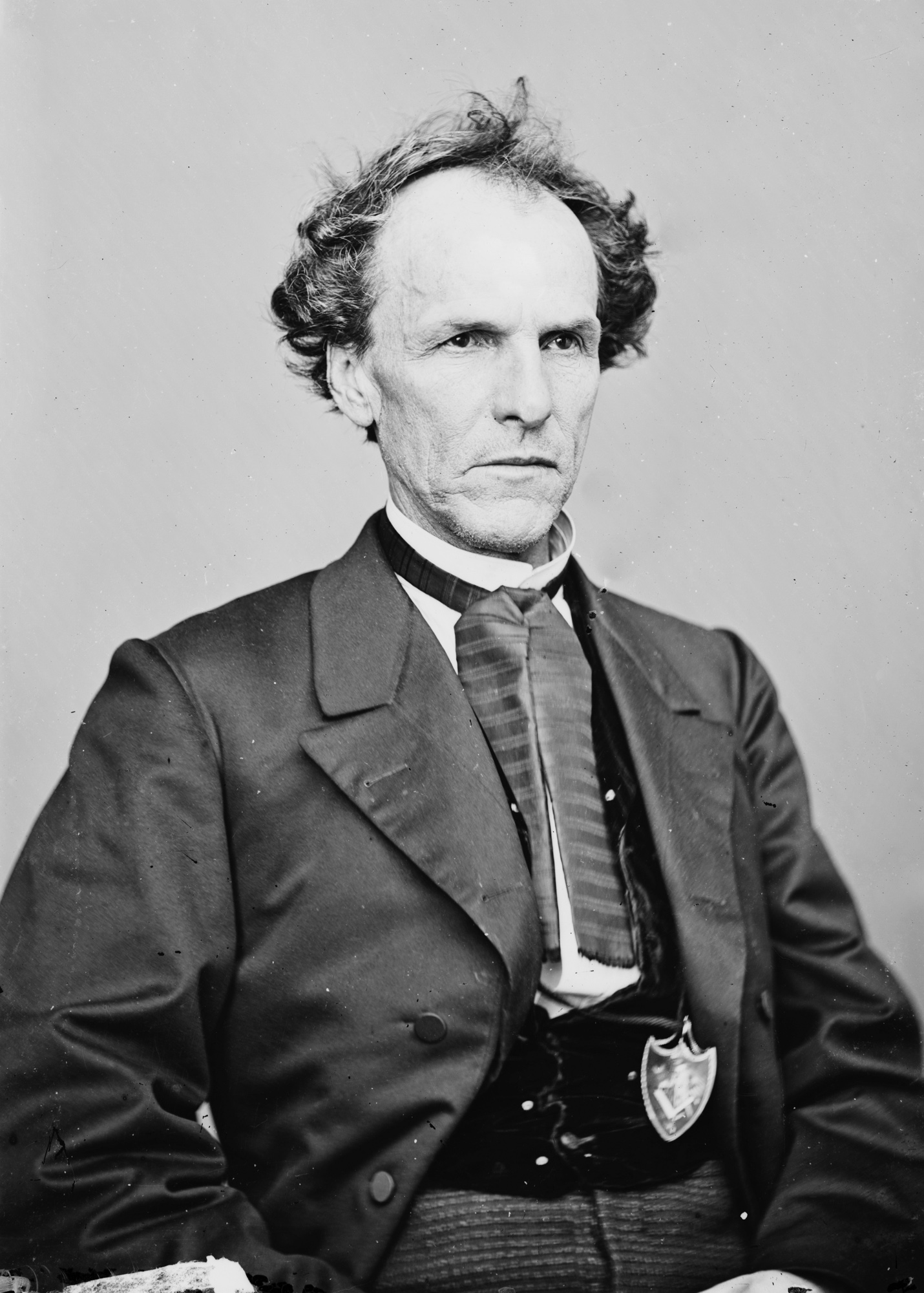
- Lane, 1855–1865

United States Senator from Kansas
- In office April 4, 1861 – July 11, 1866
- Preceded by: seat established
- Succeeded by: Edmund G. Ross

Member of the U.S. House of Representatives from Indiana's 4th district
- In office March 4, 1853 – March 3, 1855
- Preceded by: Samuel W. Parker
- Succeeded by: William Cumback

11th Lieutenant Governor of Indiana
- In office December 5, 1849 – January 10, 1853
- Governor: Joseph A. Wright
- Preceded by: Paris C. Dunning
- Succeeded by: Ashbel P. Willard

Personal details
- Born: James Henry Lane; June 22, 1814 Lawrenceburg, Indiana Territory
- Died: July 11, 1866 (aged 52) Leavenworth, Kansas
- Party: Republican
- Other political affiliations: Democratic (before 1856)
- Spouse: Mary E. Lane

Military service
- Allegiance: United States of America
- Branch/service: United States Army; Union Army
- Years of service: 1846–1848, 1861–1862
- Rank: Brigadier-General
- Battles/wars: Mexican–American War; American Civil War

Brigadier-General James Henry Lane (June 22, 1814 – July 11, 1866) was an American politician and military officer who was a leader of the Jayhawkers in the Bleeding Kansas period that immediately preceded the American Civil War. During the war itself, Lane served in the United States Senate and as a general officer in the Union Army. Although reelected as a senator in 1865, Lane died by suicide the next year.

== Early life ==
The son of Amos Lane, Lane was born in Lawrenceburg, Indiana, where he practiced law when he was admitted to the state bar during 1840. During the Mexican–American War, he successively commanded the 3rd and 5th Indiana Regiments. He was a U.S. congressman from Indiana (1853–1855) where he voted for the Kansas–Nebraska Act.

He relocated to the Kansas Territory during 1855. Remaining a Democrat for a time, he eventually became involved with the antislavery movement in Kansas, and joined the Republican party. He was often termed the commander of the Free State Army ("The Red Legs" or Jayhawkers), a major Free Soil militant group. In 1855 he was the president of the convention that drafted the anti-slavery Topeka Constitution. In the summer of 1857, he co-founded Falls City, Nebraska, intending for it to serve as a station on the Underground Railroad.

By 1858, Lane had become a member of the Kansas Danites, a secret-society founded in 1855 to oppose Missouri's influence in Kansas. The Kansas Danites were inspired by the earlier Mormon Danites, which had formed in Missouri in 1838, during the 1838 Mormon War in that state.

On June 3, 1858, Lane shot and killed Gaius Jenkins in a land dispute in Lawrence. According to reports Jenkins was coming to get water from a well on the disputed property. Jenkins was reported to have been displaying a revolver. Lane met him with a shotgun. One of the men with Jenkins shot Lane in the leg and Lane returned fire killing Jenkins. Lane was acquitted in the trial, which kept him from participating in the convention drafting of the Wyandotte Constitution, later the official constitution for Kansas.

After the Free Soilers succeeded in getting Kansas admitted to the Union in 1861 as a free state, Lane was elected as one of the new state's first U.S. Senators, and reelected in 1865.

== Civil War ==
During the American Civil War, in addition to his Senate service, Lane formed a brigade of "Jayhawkers" known as the "Kansas Brigade", or "Lane's Brigade", composed of the Third, Fourth, and Fifth Kansas Volunteers. He commanded the force into action against pro-Southern General Sterling Price of Missouri in the Battle of Dry Wood Creek, as Price began an offensive early in the War to retake Missouri for the pro-Confederate state government that had been deposed by pro-Union forces around St. Louis. Lane lost the battle but stayed behind and attacked pro-South areas in Missouri behind Price. During the subsequent Siege of Lexington, General John Charles Fremont ordered General Henry Lane to make a "demonstration along the Kansas Missouri border with his Jayhawkers". Lane acted gladly on Fremont's official authorization for a raid into Missouri. He raided the village of Morristown near the state line, burned it and swept a wide path of pillage, arson and murder of private citizens through the Missouri territory six miles wide and fifteen miles long. However, as it turns out it had little to no effect on Mulligan. "His raids culminated in the Sacking of Osceola, in which Lane's forces killed at least nine men, then pillaged, looted, and then burned the town; these events inspired the novel Gone to Texas by Forrest Carter, which was the basis for the 1976 Clint Eastwood movie The Outlaw Josey Wales. Lane was criticized for his violence in Osceola, most severely by General Henry Halleck, then Commander of the Department of Missouri. Of their actions, he would state: "The course pursued by those under Lane and Jennison has turned against us many thousands who were formerly Union men. A few more such raids, in connection with the ultra speeches made by leading men in Congress, will make the State as unanimous against us as is Eastern Virginia." Thus, Lane's Brigade was ended.

On December 18, 1861, Lane was appointed brigadier general of volunteers. On March 21, 1862, his commission was canceled in the culmination of an argument over whether a sitting U.S. Senator could concurrently have the rank of General. However, on April 11, 1862, he was reinstated as brigadier general of volunteers with the confirmation of the U.S. Senate. During 1862–1863, he served as recruiting commissioner for the State of Kansas.

On October 27–29, 1862, U.S. Senator Jim Lane recruited the 1st Regiment Kansas Volunteer Infantry (Colored) who debuted at the Skirmish at Island Mound. They are the first African-American troops to fight in the war, a year before the 54th Massachusetts. In their first action, 30 of their members defeated 130 mounted Confederate guerrillas.

Lane was the target of the event that became the Lawrence Massacre (or Quantrill's Raid) on August 21, 1863. Confederate guerrillas could be heard shouting, "Remember Osceola!" Though Lane was in residence in Lawrence at the time, he was able to escape the attack by racing through a nearby ravine, hiding in a cornfield for the duration of the attack.

In a speech given in 1863, while the 38th United States Congress was debating a bill that would confiscate land from rebelling southerners, Lane said, "I would like to live long enough to see every white man in South Carolina in hell, and the Negroes inheriting their territory. It would not wound my feelings any day to find the dead bodies of rebel sympathizers pierced with bullet holes in every street and alley of Washington. Yes, I would regret this, for I would not like to witness all this waste of powder and lead. I would rather have them hung, and the ropes saved! Let them dangle until their stinking bodies rot and fall to the ground piece by piece."

During 1864 when Sterling Price invaded Missouri, Lane served as a volunteer aide-de-camp to Samuel R. Curtis, commander of the Army of the Border. Lane was with the victorious Union forces at the battle of Westport.

== Personal life ==
Lane was a teetotaller. It was noted by many of his contemporaries that he was never seen to consume alcohol; he specifically ordered his troops to burn stockpiles of whiskey during the Sacking of Osceola. He was well-known, however, for his near-constant use of "dog-leg" chewing tobacco, a form of tobacco which was twisted into a stick and chewed.

Lane's critics often accused him of lechery, alleging that he committed adultery with prostitutes and mistresses, and that he had made numerous unsuccessful attempts to seduce various married women while living in Lawrence. This has been disputed by Lane's defenders.

Lane's wife, Mary Lane, left Lawrence to return to Indiana in 1856, and filed for a divorce. They were remarried in 1857, after which they both returned to Lawrence.

Lane was a Methodist.

== Death and legacy ==
On July 1, 1866, Lane shot himself in the head as he jumped from his carriage in Leavenworth, Kansas. He was allegedly deranged, depressed, had been charged with abandoning his fellow Radical Republicans and had been accused of financial irregularities. He died ten days later near Leavenworth, Kansas, a result of the self-inflicted gunshot. Edmund G. Ross was appointed to succeed him in the Senate.

Lane's posthumous legacy has been controversial, both among supporters of the Union as well as those of the Confederacy. The Southern view of Lane has been almost entirely negative, often portraying him as a corrupt and genocidal war criminal. Many abolitionists have presented him with almost equal unfavourability, often painting him as an unscrupulous, corrupt political opportunist who feigned his radicalism in order to achieve power in antislavery Kansas.

Much of the criticism directed towards Lane from the Northern side stems from his many disputes with Charles L. Robinson, the first governor of Kansas. The dispute between the two men centered mostly around personal animosity, as well as political rivalry, but it also represents ideological, class, and regional differences as well. Robinson was a long-term Republican and a staunch abolitionist, while Lane was a former Democrat and merely an antislavery man. The Robinson faction in Kansas generally consisted of abolitionist immigrants from New England, many of them religious and well-to-do, who opposed slavery on what they considered a "moral" ground. Lane's supporters, on the other hand, were mostly working-class Midwesterners who opposed slavery in the Kansas Territory due to class interests. As such, his reputation has often been maligned among New Englanders, while he is viewed more positively in the Midwest.

While many of Lane's pro-Union apologists concede that Lane often made ruthless use of realpolitik, they defend him on the grounds that he did what was needed to defeat slavery in Kansas, as well as to protect its citizens during the Civil War, when many of the more radical and idealistic abolitionists, such as Robinson, were seeking passive and ineffective alternatives.

The following places were named in honor of the late senator:

- Lane University, Lecompton
- Lane, Kansas
- Lane County, Kansas

== In popular culture ==
- Lane appears in Stan Haynes' 2023 historical fiction: And Union No More: A Novel which depicts some of the events of "Bleeding Kansas"
- Jim Lane appears as a character in Wildwood Boys (William Morrow, New York; 2000), a biographical novel of Bloody Bill Anderson by James Carlos Blake.
- Jim Lane is a main character in the book The 116 by James P. Muehlberger.
- Jim Lane and his brigade is mentioned in Colter Wall's, "Wild Bill Hickok" from his 2018 album, Songs of the Plains.
- In the 1976 film The Outlaw Josey Wales, Senator Jim Lane (portrayed by Frank Schofield) is the general who commissions the reward for the title character (portrayed by Clint Eastwood.)

== See also ==
- List of American Civil War generals (Union)
- List of members of the United States Congress from multiple states
- List of members of the United States Congress who died in office (1790–1899)

Political offices
Preceded by Paris C. Dunning	Lieutenant Governor of Indiana; 1849 – 1853	Succeeded by Ashbel P. Willard
U.S. House of Representatives
Preceded by Samuel W. Parker	Member of the U.S. House of Representatives from Indiana's 4th congressional district March 4, 1853 – March 3, 1855	Succeeded by William Cumback
U.S. Senate
Preceded by (none)	U.S. senator (Class 2) from Kansas; March 4, 1861 – July 11, 1866; Served alongside: Samuel C. Pomeroy	Succeeded by Edmund G. Ross
