= Second Battle of Lexington =

Battle of the American Civil War

Coordinates: 39°10′59″N 93°52′30″W

- Part of the American Civil War
Date	October 19, 1864
Location	Lexington, Missouri
Result	Confederate victory

Belligerents
(Confederate States of America) Confederate States	United States

Commanders and leaders
Sterling Price	James G. Blunt

Units involved
Army of Missouri	Two brigades of Blunt's division

Strength
6,000 to 8,000 engaged	2,000

Casualties and losses
Light	Light

The Second Battle of Lexington was a minor battle fought during Price's Missouri Expedition as part of the American Civil War. Hoping to draw Union Army forces away from more important theaters of combat and potentially affect the outcome of the 1864 United States presidential election, Sterling Price, a major general in the Confederate States Army, led an offensive into the state of Missouri on September 19, 1864. After a botched attack at the Battle of Pilot Knob, the strength of the Union defenses at Jefferson City led Price to abandon the main goals of his campaign.

In response to the Confederate incursion, the Union Army of the Border under Major General Samuel R. Curtis was formed by withdrawing troops from duty guarding isolated settlements along the western frontier and calling up the Kansas militia. The call-up of the militia became a political issue in Kansas, which restricted Curtis's use of the militiamen. Price's army was moving west along the Missouri River, and was caught between Curtis's Army of the Border and Union Department of the Missouri cavalry pursuing from the east. Major General James G. Blunt took a portion of Curtis's army east to the town of Lexington, Missouri, on October 18. Blunt was hoping for reinforcement from Curtis, but this was not feasible due to most of the Kansas militia's refusal to move that far into Missouri.

On October 19, Price's army, led by Brigadier General Joseph O. Shelby's command, attacked Blunt at Lexington. Initial contact was made at around 11:00 am, but it took several hours for the Confederates to develop their attack. Blunt's outnumbered command was gradually pushed back as Price deployed more of his army. Confederate rifled artillery played a major role in the outcome of the battle, outranging the Union mountain howitzers. The Confederates attempted to cut the Union path of retreat with a cavalry brigade, but this was unsuccessful. Protected by a rear guard, Blunt's troops fell back behind the Little Blue River. Blunt fought another delaying action at the Battle of Little Blue River on October 21, and after the Battle of Byram's Ford and the Second Battle of Independence on October 22, Price was defeated at the Battle of Westport. Several other battles followed during Price's withdrawal, including a defeat at the Battle of Mine Creek on October 25. The campaign wrecked Price's army as an effective fighting force and the Confederates did not make another offensive campaign in the Trans-Mississippi theater before the surrender of the department on June 2, 1865.

== Background ==
At the start of the American Civil War in 1861, the state of Missouri was a slave state, but did not declare secession, as the state secession convention rejected it. Nonetheless, the state was politically divided: Governor Claiborne Fox Jackson and the Missouri State Guard (MSG) supported secession and the Confederate States of America, while Brigadier General Nathaniel Lyon and the Union Army opposed it. Under Major General Sterling Price, the MSG defeated Union armies at the battles of Wilson's Creek and Lexington in 1861, but by the end of the year, Price and the MSG had been restricted to the southwestern region of the state. Meanwhile, Jackson and a portion of the state legislature voted to secede and join the Confederate States of America, while another element of the legislature voted to reject secession, essentially giving the state two governments. In March 1862, a Confederate defeat at the Battle of Pea Ridge in Arkansas gave the Union control of Missouri, and Confederate activity in the state was largely restricted to guerrilla warfare and raids throughout 1862 and 1863.

By the beginning of September 1864, events in the eastern United States, especially the Confederate defeat in the Atlanta campaign, gave Abraham Lincoln, who supported continuing the war, an edge in the 1864 United States presidential election over George B. McClellan, who favored ending the war. At this point, the Confederacy had very little chance of prevailing over Union military forces. Meanwhile, in the Trans-Mississippi Theater, the Confederates had defeated Union attackers during the Red River campaign in Louisiana, which took place from March through May. As events east of the Mississippi River turned against the Confederates, General Edmund Kirby Smith, Confederate commander of the Trans-Mississippi Department, was ordered to transfer the infantry under his command to the fighting in the Eastern and Western Theaters. However, this proved to be impossible, as the Union Navy controlled the Mississippi River, preventing a large-scale crossing. Despite having limited resources for an offensive, Smith decided an attack designed to divert Union troops from the principal theaters of combat would have an equivalent effect to the proposed transfer of troops, through decreasing the Confederates' numerical disparity east of the Mississippi.

Price and the Confederate Governor of Missouri, Thomas Caute Reynolds, suggested an invasion of Missouri would be an effective offensive; Smith approved the plan and appointed Price to command the operation. Price expected the offensive would give rise to a popular uprising against Union control of Missouri, divert Union troops away from principal theaters of combat (many of the Union troops previously defending Missouri had been transferred out of the state, leaving the Missouri State Militia (Note: The Missouri State Militia was a full-time militia force formed in 1862 and funded by the United States federal government.) to be the state's primary defensive force), and aid McClellan's chance of defeating Lincoln in the election. On September 19, Price's column, named the Army of Missouri, entered the state.

== Prelude ==
=== Price enters Missouri and Union response ===
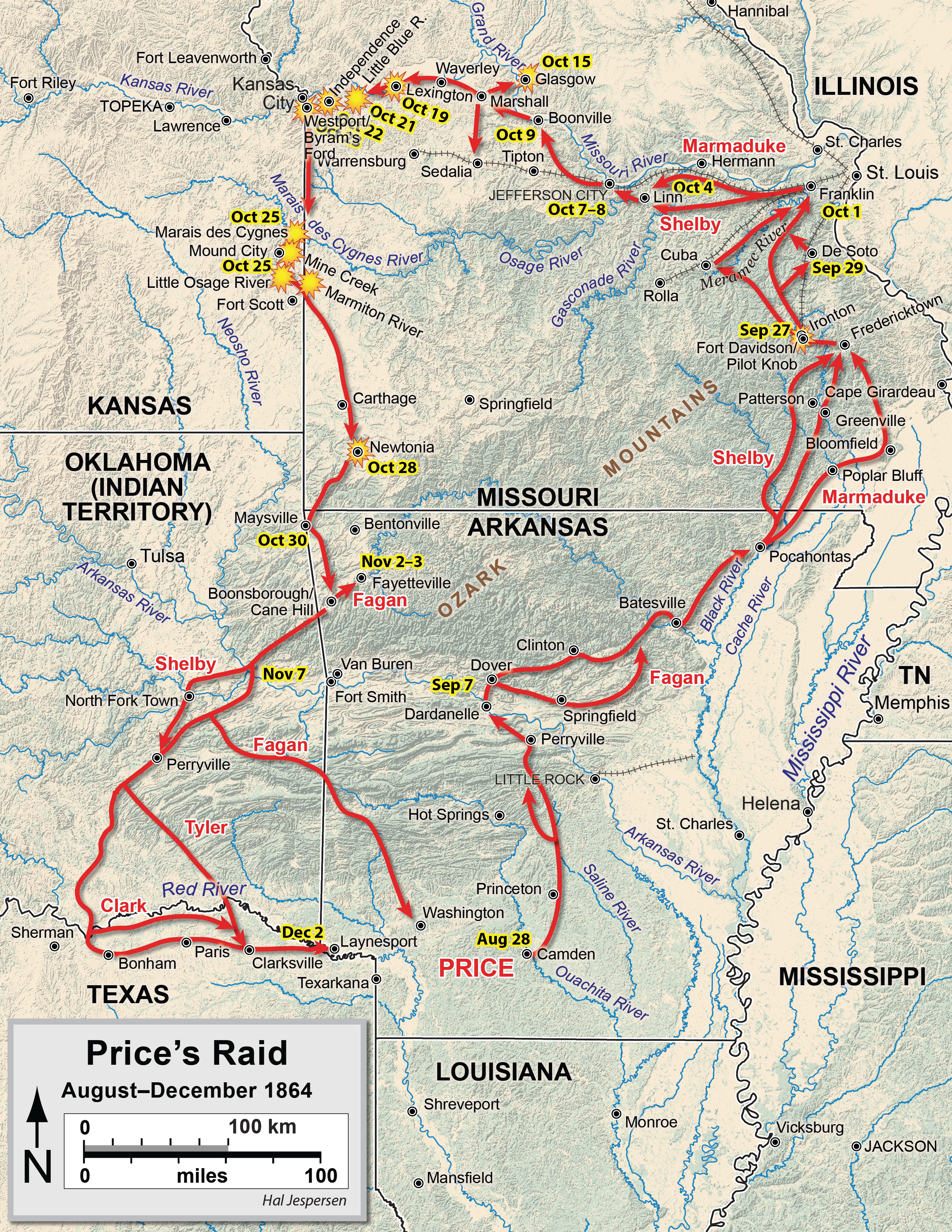
Map of Price's raid

When it entered the state, Price's force was composed of about 13,000 cavalrymen. However, several thousand of these soldiers were poorly armed, and all fourteen of the army's cannons were small-caliber, which limited their effectiveness against fortifications. This Confederate army was divided into three divisions, which were commanded by Major Generals James F. Fagan and John S. Marmaduke and Brigadier General Joseph O. Shelby. Fagan's division was subdivided into four brigades, Marmaduke's two, and Shelby's three. Shelby and Marmaduke's divisions were mostly Missouri troops, while most of Fagan's soldiers were from Arkansas. Fagan's division had a battery and a section of artillery, (Note: A section of artillery consisted of two guns. Batteries during the American Civil War usually had either four or six cannons. Batteries sometimes contained more than six guns, but units of this size proved unwieldy. Other sizes of batteries were not unknown. The largest battery in Price's army had four cannons.) Marmaduke's division had two batteries, and Shelby's division had a single battery. Price's best combat unit, Shelby's Iron Brigade, was part of its former commander's division. Most of Price's units were understrength, some of the soldiers were unarmed, and others in the cavalry lacked mounts. Countering Price was the Union Department of the Missouri, under the command of Major General William S. Rosecrans, who had fewer than 10,000 soldiers on hand, many of whom were militiamen. Rosecrans had been relegated to the department earlier after being defeated at the Battle of Chickamauga; many of the top Union military leaders had little confidence in him.

In late September, the Confederates encountered a small Union force holding Fort Davidson near the town of Pilot Knob. Attacks against the post in the Battle of Pilot Knob on September 27 failed, but the Union garrison abandoned the fort that night. Price had suffered hundreds of casualties in the battle, and decided to divert the aim of his advance from St. Louis to Jefferson City. Price's army was accompanied by a sizable wagon train, which significantly slowed its movement. The delays caused by this slow progress enabled Union forces to reinforce Jefferson City, whose garrison was increased from 1,000 to 7,000 between October 1 and October 6. In turn, Price determined Jefferson City was too strong to attack, and began moving westward along the course of the Missouri River. The Confederates entered the Boonslick region, where Confederate sympathy was strongest in Missouri. Price's troops were welcomed by the population, but still engaged in some plundering. During the earlier parts of the campaign, most recruitment to Price's army had been through involuntary conscription, but in the Boonslick, voluntary recruiting was more successful. At least 2,500 volunteers joined Price's army in the region, although this was offset to some degree by veteran soldiers allowed to take furlough being unable to rejoin their units as the campaign situation changed. Historian Howard N. Monnett describes the recruits Price received at Boonville as "farm boys, unarmed and ill-prepared". During this time, a side raid against the town of Glasgow on October 15 was successful, as was another raid against Sedalia.

As Price's army moved west from Jefferson City, it was harassed by Union troops. On October 6, Major General Alfred Pleasonton arrived at St. Louis after Rosecrans recalled him from leave. Pleasonton reached Jefferson City two days later and then organized a cavalry division consisting of four brigades, which were commanded by Brigadier Generals Egbert B. Brown, John McNeil, John B. Sanborn, and Colonel Edward F. Winslow. Pleasonton sent Sanborn and his brigade after the Confederates with instructions to "harass and delay [Price] as much as possible until other troops could be brought forward". An infantry division commanded by Major General A. J. Smith was diverted to St. Louis; Rosecrans sent these 4,500 veteran infantry in pursuit of Price, but they never saw action during the campaign.

To the west, the Department of Kansas was commanded by Major General Samuel R. Curtis. Curtis had roughly 7,000 troops in his department, but they were spread over a wide area protecting isolated settlements on the western frontier from raids by Native American tribes. Major General James G. Blunt and some of the department's troops were withdrawn from their role in fights against the Cheyenne. Along with some troops already stationed along the Missouri-Kansas border, this amounted to about 4,000 troops. Curtis considered it necessary to call up the Kansas State Militia to provide more manpower and informed Governor of Kansas Thomas Carney on September 17 the situation might warrant the mobilization of the militia. The call-up was delayed by Kansas politics. Carney and his followers were opposed by United States Senator James H. Lane's faction of the Kansas Republican Party. Carney suspected the militia call-up was a ploy by Curtis to influence the outcome of the 1864 Kansas gubernatorial election by preventing voters who supported Carney's faction from being present at the polls on election day. Carney had resisted an October 5 call from Curtis to mobilize the militia, and did not order the mobilization until he telegraphed Rosecrans on October 9, who confirmed Price's force did indeed pose a threat to Kansas. The Kansas militiamen were placed under the command of Major General George Deitzler, who had previous combat experience at Wilson's Creek and in the Vicksburg campaign; these militiamen made up the bulk of Curtis's command.

=== To Lexington ===
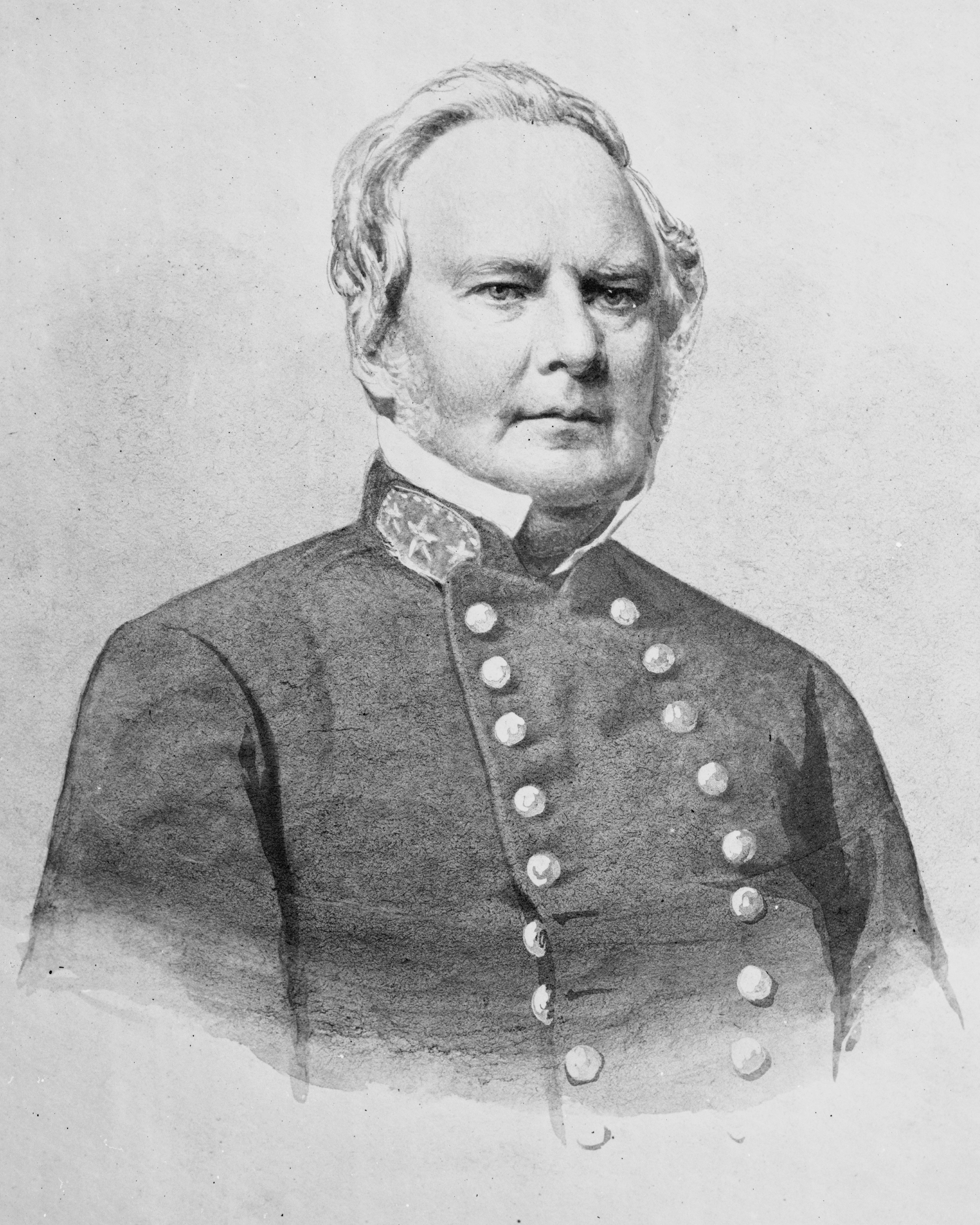
Sterling Price commanded the Confederate troops who took part in his 1864 Missouri Expedition

On October 14, Curtis named his command the Army of the Border and organized it into two divisions: the First Division under Blunt and the Second Division under Deitzler. Blunt's division was a mixed force of militia and army soldiers, while Deitzler's force was composed entirely of militiamen. Of Curtis's roughly 16,000 to 18,000 troops, all but 4,000 were militia. Blunt had his troops at Hickman Mills, Missouri, that same day. He organized his division into three brigades there. (Note: A fourth brigade was added to Blunt's division a week later.) Blunt's first brigade, under the command of Colonel Charles R. Jennison, was composed of the 15th Kansas Cavalry Regiment and part of the 3rd Wisconsin Cavalry Regiment. The second brigade was commanded by Colonel Thomas Moonlight and consisted of the 11th Kansas Cavalry Regiment and parts of the 5th Kansas Cavalry Regiment and the 16th Kansas Cavalry Regiment. Moonlight was a political partisan for Lane, while Jennison was a former backer of Lane who had since switched to the Carney fold, while Blunt himself was a Lane supporter. The third brigade's commander, Colonel Charles W. Blair, was less politically involved than the other two, and his brigade contained part of the 14th Kansas Cavalry Regiment and three militia units (the 3rd, 6th, and 10th Kansas State Militia). Each brigade was assigned an artillery battery, Blair's brigade getting an extra artillery section; this amounted to four guns each for Jennison and Moonlight and eight for Blair, two of which were from a militia unit.

Having some of the militia under Blunt's command caused further political issues in the form of militia Brigadier General Charles W. Fishback, who resented being subordinate to a colonel. Fishback, under his own initiative, ordered one of the militia regiments assigned to Blair back to Kansas, an order which was countermanded by Blunt, who had Fishback arrested. Even after the militia had been called out, political issues between Carney and Blunt continued. Sanborn and Pleasonton had not kept in continuous contact with Price, and the telegraph link between Curtis and the Union troops on the other side of Price's force had been broken. Lacking good reports of Price's location, doubts grew in the mind of Carney and other influential Kansans that Price's force was actually a threat to Kansas. Fears remained that Curtis was interfering with the upcoming election or that northeastern Kansas had been left exposed to pro-Confederate Missouri guerrillas.

The 2nd Colorado Cavalry Regiment and the 16th Kansas Cavalry Regiment, which were part of the pre-campaign garrison along the Missouri-Kansas border, were under the command of the 2nd Colorado's Colonel James H. Ford, at Independence, Missouri, 9 miles (14 km) east of Kansas City. Ford sent parts of the two regiments to scout from Independence to Lexington, Missouri, under the command of Major J. Nelson Smith, who was an officer of the 2nd Colorado. Sending troops on a scout east of the Little Blue River, Smith received several reports regarding Price's movements. At Lexington, 35 miles (56 km) to the east of Independence, the small Missouri State Militia garrison abandoned the town; by October 14, it had been occupied by pro-Confederate guerrillas. Late on October 16, Curtis decided to send Blunt's division less Blair's brigade in the direction of Warrensburg to scout for Confederate troops; if the area was clear of opposing forces he had the option to move north to Lexington. Blunt probed south and east from Hickman Mills to Pleasant Hill late that day, having sent Blair's brigade to Kansas City to be equipped. This detachment left Blunt with roughly 2,000 men and eight 12-pounder mountain howitzers.

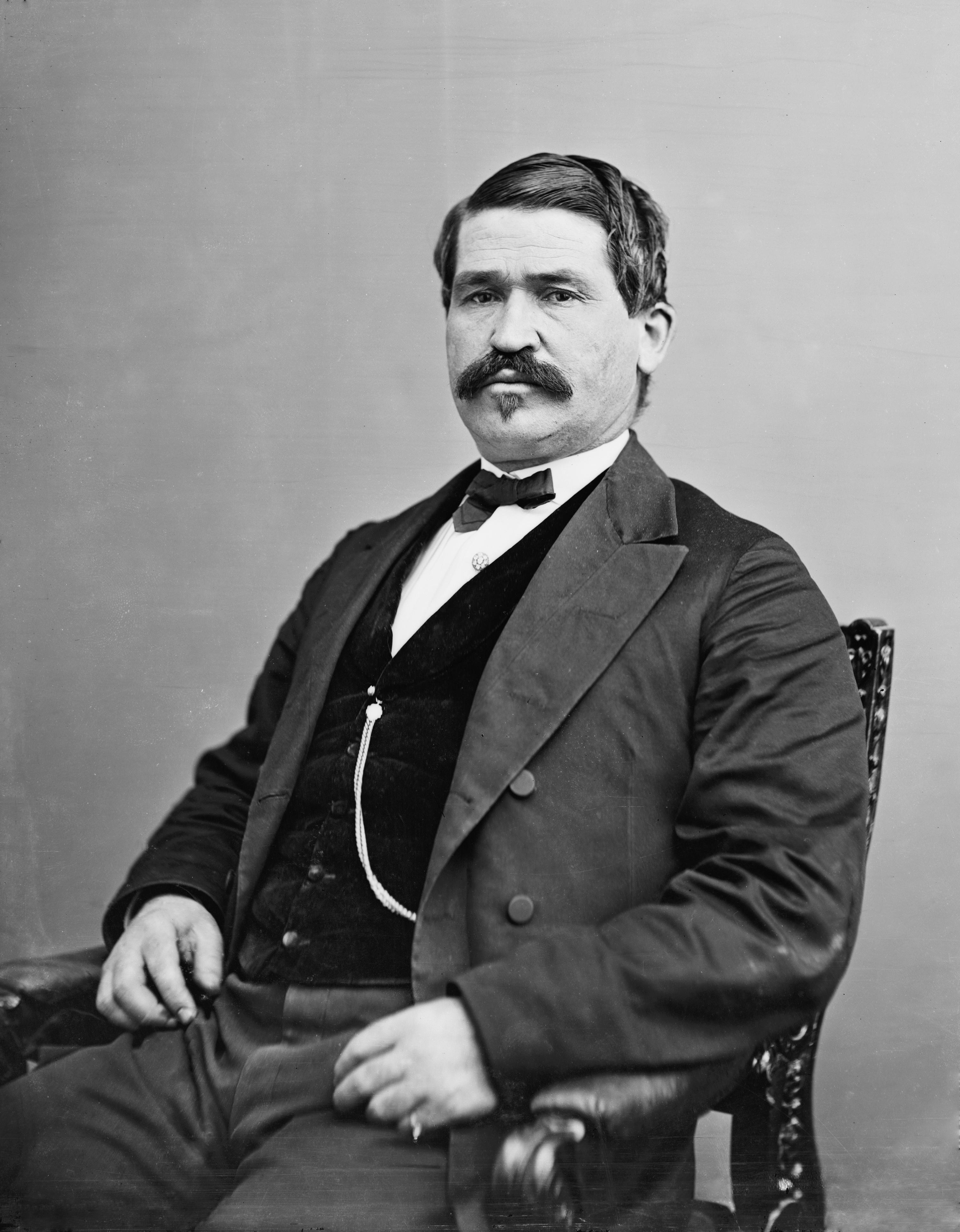
A photograph of James G. Blunt in civilian attire. Blunt commanded the Union troops during the battle at Lexington.

Finding no enemy troops at Pleasant Hill, Blunt decided to advance, moving his troops to Holden. By 5:00 p.m. on October 17, Blunt had received information Price and Shelby were at Waverly, which was 20 miles (32 km) east of Lexington. Sanborn was reported to be at Dunksburg, with A. J. Smith's troops further behind. Blunt requested Curtis send the 2nd Colorado Cavalry and the portion of the 16th Kansas Cavalry that were at Independence east to Lexington; after the battle of Lexington the two regiments formed the core of a new brigade added to Blunt's command.

Requesting support from Curtis and Sanborn, Blunt moved his troops after dark on October 17 to Lexington. Senator Lane accompanied Blunt as a member of his staff. Blunt hoped to catch Price's army between his force, Smith's and Pleasonton's, and the Missouri River. Also on October 17, Major Smith of the 2nd Colorado and Major James Kentner of the 16th Kansas Cavalry scouted with roughly 300 troops from Independence to Lexington, but with insufficient supplies, returned to Independence, although these troops were sent back towards Lexington soon after having returned to Independence as part of Blunt's concentration of force at Lexington. Moonlight's troops reached Lexington the next morning and drove out some pro-Confederate guerrillas; the rest of Blunt's force reached the town later that day. Lexington was not a readily defensible position. What little high ground there was at the town was along the Missouri River, near the Masonic College site, where Price had defeated a Union force in the 1861 Siege of Lexington. The terrain was open and did not contain any natural bottlenecks, and roads ran into Lexington from multiple directions. Blunt positioned Moonlight's brigade at the Masonic College, while Jennison's troops were deployed at a fairgrounds several miles south. Blunt was suffering from sleep deprivation and made few preparations for a defense before the late evening of October 18. After dark, Blunt sent two companies commanded by Captain Louis Green south of Lexington to picket the Warrensburg road, while a force of roughly battalion size commanded by Captain H. E. Palmer drawn from the 2nd Colorado and the 11th Kansas Cavalry was deployed three miles east of Lexington, guarding the approach from Dover.

The Confederate troops who had raided Glasgow and Sedalia had returned to Price's main body at Waverly, and Price had mostly regathered his army by late on October 17. The Confederate army had been recruiting as it passed through the Boonslick. On October 18, Price was informed by a spy that sizable Union forces from Jefferson City and St. Louis were pursuing from the east, and that at least 3,000 Union troops had occupied Lexington. Concerned he could not supply or protect any further soldiers, Price ceased recruiting and moved his roughly 17,000 troops west to Lexington early on October 19, with a plan of advance designed to capture Blunt's whole force at Lexington. With Shelby's troops in the lead, Price's army struck Lexington in three prongs. Shelby's troops were ordered to swing around Lexington to the south and strike the road to Independence west of the town; this force would be split into two different groups during the battle, each approached Lexington along different routes. The Confederates also approached Lexington from the east along the Dover road.

== Battle ==
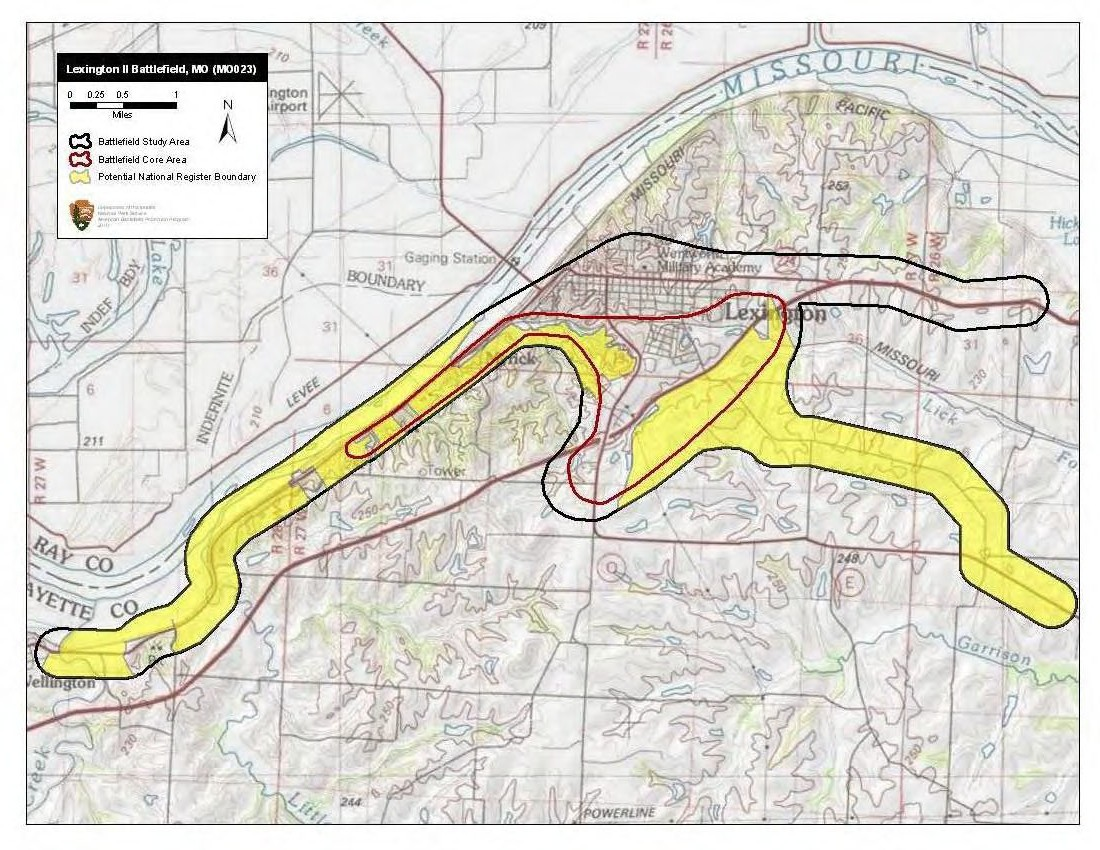
Map of the core and study areas of the battlefield as defined by the American Battlefield Protection Program.

In Lexington, Blunt placed the town under martial law and called out all able-bodied male civilians, either black or white, who were between the ages of 15 and 60. The citizens were to assemble at 2:00 p.m. to build fortifications, but the fighting opened before then. Scouting parties were sent out from the Union line, and at around 11:00 am, Shelby's troops encountered Union forces at the Burns House, which was roughly 4 or 5 miles (6.4 or 8.0 km) from Lexington on the Salt Pond Road. At generally the same time, scouts returned to Blunt, bringing news of the contact with Confederate troops on the Salt Pond Road, as well as evidence of Confederate troops coming from the east on the road from Dover. A message from Curtis also arrived, informing Blunt he could not send reinforcements to Lexington; the majority of the Kansas militia were not willing to advance into Missouri. Curtis ordered Blunt to withdraw west of the Little Blue River to the Big Blue River, where the main Union position was. Unbeknownst to Blunt, there was no chance of reinforcement from Sanborn either, as Sanborn did not receive Blunt's request for aid until the morning of October 19, by which time it was too late to save the Lexington position.

Shelby's advance was led by the Iron Brigade commanded by Brigadier General M. Jeff Thompson. (Note: Thompson's commission was in the Missouri State Guard, a pro-Confederate militia organization, not the regular Confederate army.) Thompson spent the next three hours after contact was made deploying his force, with his troops aligned on either side of the Salt Pond Road. Meanwhile, Shelby moved to the road from Warrensburg with Colonel Sidney D. Jackman's brigade. Blunt positioned Jennison on the Union right and Moonlight on the left; Blunt's deployments covered the road to Independence, which was the Union line of retreat. Jennison threw out a skirmish line with troops from the 3rd Wisconsin Cavalry and the 15th Kansas Cavalry to confront Thompson, who began his attack at 2:00 p.m. The Confederates drove back the outlying Union lines, except on the road from Dover, where Palmer's line (which had been reinforced by a militia company) held against a roughly equal number of Confederates. Moonlight's troops came under Confederate pressure, and fell back from a cornfield to a position at a ravine near the fairgrounds beyond Jennison's line. While Blunt's troops put up a stiff fight, Thompson's troops continued to drive the Union troops back towards the north and west. Confederate rifled artillery had a significant impact on the fight: only two guns from Collins's Missouri Battery were in action for the Confederates compared to Blunt's eight cannons, but Collins's two pieces outranged the Union mountain howitzers.

During the fight, many of the Union scouting parties were at least temporarily cut off from Blunt's main body. Palmer's position east of Lexington had been reinforced by some Missouri militia, and was assailed by Confederate troops multiple times. By 3:00 p.m., Palmer's men could hear Blunt's fight. Two hours later the sound of the fighting had largely ceased; Palmer determined he was isolated from the main Union body. Palmer and his men did not rejoin Blunt's main force until late on October 20. Price added the forces of Fagan and Marmaduke to the fight, although the advance of these troops west towards Lexington was slow. At around 3:00 p.m., Blunt began to withdraw, with Jennison's brigade pulling out first; Shelby had failed to get Jackman's brigade in a position where it could block the Union retreat. Moonlight made a covering stand southwest of the fairgrounds on a hill about 1 mile (1.6 km) from Lexington; for this defense, Moonlight had roughly 500 soldiers and four of Blunt's cannons.

Moonlight's force retreated, making a stand in one position with the 11th Kansas Cavalry and the cannons until the position was flanked, after which the Union troops fell back to a new position, with the artillery withdrawing first to then cover the retreat of the cavalrymen. The Confederate pursuit became weaker after dark; the fighting ended at roughly midnight as the Union troops crossed Sni-A-Bar Creek, which was 7 miles (11 km) from Lexington. The 11th Kansas Cavalry's commander Lieutenant Colonel Preston B. Plumb ordered the bridge over Sni-A-Bar Creek burned, but Confederate troops were able to put out the fire. Blunt had gained definite evidence about Price's strengths and exact movements, which the Union high command had been lacking since the time Price was still in Arkansas, although the historian Mark A. Lause questions "how many times the [Union] needed to learn such lessons about a force that had been rampaging through Missouri for a month".

== Aftermath ==
Lause estimates the Confederates actually had about 6,000 to 8,000 engaged at Lexington, although Blunt and Moonlight thought they had faced 20,000 Confederates. Price reported he had faced "between 3,000 and 4,000" Union troops, compared to the actual 2,000 soldiers Blunt had for the battle. The historian Kyle S. Sinisi notes Union casualties were estimated to be about forty; Price gave no official total, but stated his losses were "very light". Lause believes "casualty estimates merit severe skepticism" given that neither commander had an accurate idea of the strength of the opposing force. Curtis estimated Union losses at roughly 50; contemporary Kansas newspapers referenced figures of twenty and "about forty". Lause states "the actual reports offer the numbers of killed and wounded in the single digits"; he considers the Union casualties to be "minimal", and estimates Price lost about twice as many soldiers as Curtis.

The Confederates spent the night near Fire Prairie Creek, while Blunt retreated to the Little Blue River, reaching that position at about 9:00 am that day after the battle. Blunt wanted to make a stand at the Little Blue River, but Curtis ordered him back to the Big Blue River due to the Kansas militia's reluctance to operate that far into Missouri. Moonlight was placed in command of a small force to fight a delaying action at the Little Blue. The Battle of Little Blue River began on the morning of October 21. That morning, Curtis changed his mind and allowed Blunt to take the rest of his force back to the Little Blue River, but Blunt was forced to withdraw through Independence to the Big Blue River. Curtis deployed his Army of the Border behind prepared positions on the west side of the Big Blue River. Price's troops were caught between Curtis to the west and Pleasonton's troops advancing from the east, and had to protect their sizable wagon train as well.

Shelby breached the Big Blue River line on October 22 in the Battle of Byram's Ford, while Pleasonton drove Price's rear guard through Independence in the Second Battle of Independence. The following day, Price's troops fought Curtis's at the Battle of Westport, but Pleasonton broke through Marmaduke's line at Byram's Ford, which allowed the Confederates fighting near Westport to be struck on the flank. Defeated, Price's troops withdrew southward into Kansas. On October 25, the retreating Confederates were defeated at the Battle of Marais des Cygnes and then more decisively at the Battle of Mine Creek. Moving back into Missouri, Price was defeated a third time on October 25 at the Battle of Marmiton River. Another battle in Missouri occurred on October 28 in the Second Battle of Newtonia; the Union pursuit of Price ended at the Arkansas River in the Indian Territory in November. On November 23, the Confederate survivors reached Bonham, Texas, before moving to Laynesport, Arkansas, on December 2. Price's army had been destroyed as an effective combat force, and the Confederates made no more offensive operations in the Trans-Mississippi before the end of the war and the surrender of the department on June 2, 1865.

A 2011 study by the American Battlefield Protection Program found that although the site of the battle is threatened by construction for Missouri Route 13, and is otherwise fragmented by development, opportunities for preservation remain at the site. The same report noted that none of the battlefield is on the National Register of Historic Places, but 3,543.31 acres (1,433.93 ha) of the site are likely eligible for listing. The Battle of Lexington State Historic Site is concerned with the preservation of the 1861 First Battle of Lexington.

== See also ==
- List of American Civil War battles

== Sources ==
- Allardice, Bruce S. (1995). More Generals in Gray. Baton Rouge, Louisiana: Louisiana State University Press. ISBN 0-8071-1967-9.
- Collins, Charles D. Jr. (2016). Battlefield Atlas of Price's Missouri Expedition of 1864 (PDF). Fort Leavenworth, Kansas: Combat Studies Institute Press. ISBN 978-1-940804-27-9.
- Current, Richard N., ed. (1993). The Confederacy. New York: Simon and Schuster Macmillan. ISBN 978-0-02-864920-7.
- Forsyth, Michael J. (2015). The Great Missouri Raid: Sterling Price and the Last Major Confederate Campaign in Northern Territory. Jefferson, North Carolina: McFarland & Co. ISBN 978-1-4766-1923-1.
- Geise, William Royston (2022). Forsyth, Michael J. (ed.). The Confederate Military Forces in the Trans-Mississippi West, 1861–1865. El Dorado Hills, California: Savas Beatie. ISBN 978-1-61121-621-9.
- Hatcher, Richard (1998). "Wilson's Creek, Missouri". In Kennedy, Frances H. (ed.). The Civil War Battlefield Guide (2nd ed.). Boston/New York: Houghton Mifflin. ISBN 978-0-395-74012-5.
- Hess, Earl J. (2023). Civil War Field Artillery: Promise and Performance on the Battlefield. Baton Rouge, Louisiana: Louisiana State University Press. ISBN 978-0-8071-7800-3.
- Kennedy, Frances H., ed. (1998). The Civil War Battlefield Guide (2nd ed.). Boston/New York: Houghton Mifflin. ISBN 978-0-395-74012-5.
- Langsdorf, Edgar (1964). "Price's Raid and the Battle of Mine Creek" (PDF). The Kansas Historical Quarterly. 30 (3). Kansas State Historical Society. ISSN 0022-8621. Archived (PDF) from the original on August 24, 2024.
- Lause, Mark A. (2016). The Collapse of Price's Raid: The Beginning of the End in Civil War Missouri. Columbia, Missouri: University of Missouri Press. ISBN 978-0-826-22025-7.
- McPherson, James M. (1998). "Pro-Confederate Activity in Missouri". In Kennedy, Frances H. (ed.). The Civil War Battlefield Guide (2nd ed.). Boston/New York: Houghton Mifflin. pp. 377–379. ISBN 978-0-395-74012-5.
- Monnett, Howard N. (1995) [1964]. Action Before Westport 1864 (Revised ed.). Boulder, Colorado: University Press of Colorado. ISBN 978-0-87081-413-6.
- Shea, William L. (2023). Union General: Samuel Ryan Curtis and Victory in the West. Lincoln, Nebraska: Potomac Books. ISBN 978-1-64012-518-6.
- Shea, William L.; Hess, Earl J. (1998). "Pea Ridge, Arkansas". In Kennedy, Frances H. (ed.). The Civil War Battlefield Guide (2nd ed.). Boston/New York: Houghton Mifflin. pp. 34–37. ISBN 978-0-395-74012-5.
- Sinisi, Kyle S. (2020) [2015]. The Last Hurrah: Sterling Price's Missouri Expedition of 1864 (paperback ed.). Lanham, Maryland: Rowman & Littlefield. ISBN 978-1-5381-4151-9.
- "Update to the Civil War Sites Advisory Commission Report on the Nation's Civil War Battlefields: State of Missouri" (PDF). Washington, D. C.: American Battlefield Protection Program. March 2011. Archived (PDF) from the original on October 9, 2025.
- Welcher, Frank J. (1993). The Union Army 1861–1865: Organization and Operations. Vol. II: The Western Theater. Bloomington, Indiana: Indiana University Press. ISBN 0-253-36454-X.
