= Battle of Platte Bridge =

1865 battle of the American Indian Wars

- Part of Colorado War, Sioux Wars, American Indian Wars
- Indian attack on North Platte Crossing, 1865 (1867 illustration)
Date	July 26, 1865
Location	Near present day Casper, Wyoming 42.8383°N 106.3689°W
Result	Indian victory

Belligerents
United States	Lakota; Cheyenne; Arapaho

Commanders and leaders
Maj. Martin Anderson; Capt. Adam Smith Leib; Lt. Caspar Collins †; Sgt. Amos Custard †	Man Afraid Of His Horses; Red Cloud; Roman Nose; Crazy Horse; Dull Knife

Strength
150 soldiers, a few civilians and Shoshoni scouts	2,000 to 3,000

Casualties and losses
29 killed, 10 seriously wounded	8 killed

The Battle of Platte Bridge, also called the Battle of Platte Bridge Station, on July 26, 1865, was the culmination of a summer offensive by the Lakota Sioux and Cheyenne Indians against the United States army. In May and June the Indians raided army outposts and stagecoach stations over a wide swath of Wyoming and Montana. In July, they assembled a large army, estimated by Cheyenne warrior George Bent to number 3,000 warriors, and descended upon Platte Bridge. The bridge, across the North Platte River near present-day Casper, Wyoming, was guarded by 120 soldiers. In an engagement near the bridge, and another against a wagon train guarded by 28 soldiers a few miles away, the Indians killed 29 soldiers while also suffering at least eight dead.

== Background ==
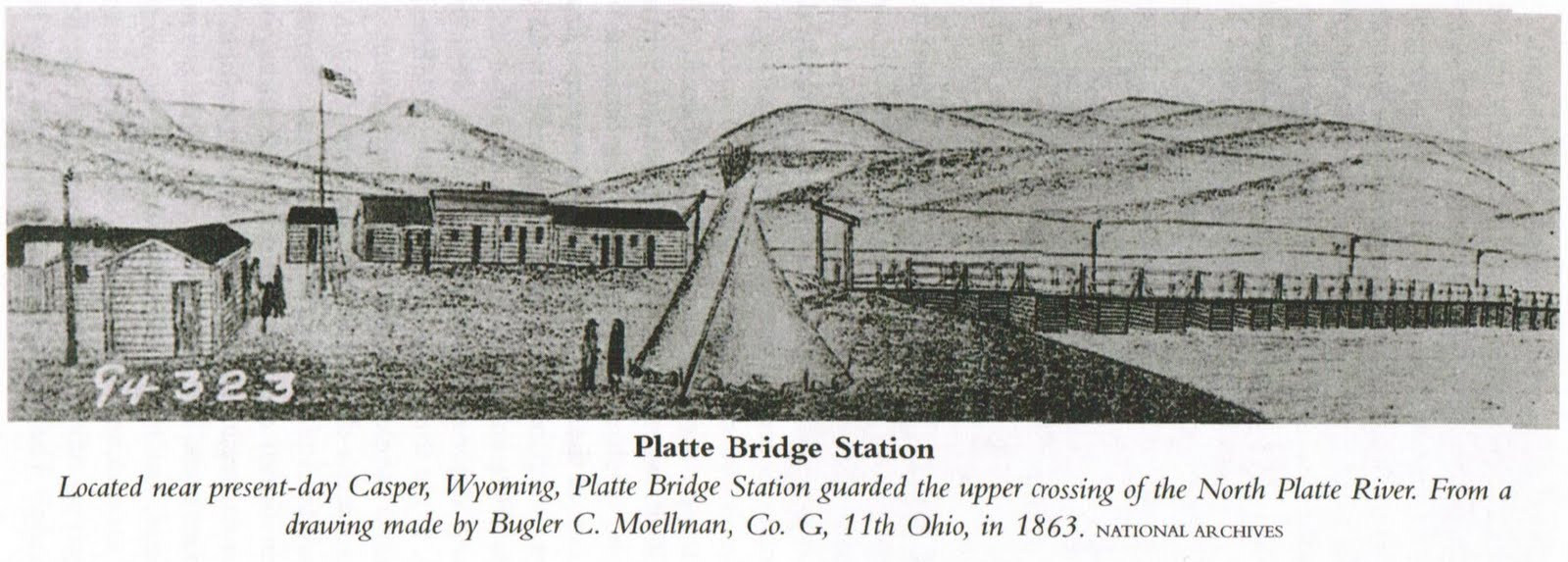

The Sand Creek Massacre in Colorado in November 1864 catalyzed an uprising among the Plains Indians of the central Great Plains. About 4,000 Brulé Lakota, Southern Cheyenne, and Southern Arapaho, including about 1,000 warriors, moved north from Colorado and Kansas to join their northern relatives in the Powder River Country of the future states of Wyoming and Montana. Along the way they raided ranches and wagon trains, acquired a huge amount of plunder, and fought battles with the army at Julesburg, Mud Springs, and Rush Creek.

With the coming of spring 1865, their horses recovering strength after the long winter, the Lakota and Cheyenne decided to attack along the North Platte River during the summer. Messages were sent to Sitting Bull and the Hunkpapa Lakotas in North Dakota and Montana and the Hunkpapa agreed to attack Fort Rice in North Dakota simultaneously. In the opinion of historian Stephen E. Ambrose, the plan was the closest the Lakota and Cheyenne ever came to a "concerted, unified offensive movement."

As a military force, the Indians had serious weaknesses. "It was only in midsummer and early winter that they could raise a large force, and even then they could not hold their warriors together for a longer period than a week or ten days." The Indians had few guns and little ammunition, and their basic weapon, the bow and arrow, was nearly worthless against a well-fortified or entrenched enemy. The Indians had no command structure; individual Indian warriors followed only who they wished and fought only when they wished and they took the offensive primarily to acquire horses and to win personal, rather than collective, honors. Their fatal flaw was that they "were unable to turn a battle into a campaign." Moreover, the Indians were divided among themselves. Only a few Arapaho participated in the war, and about 1,500 Lakota, mostly Brulé under Spotted Tail, had taken up peaceful residence at Fort Laramie in Spring 1865. The Lakota living near the fort were known as the "Laramie loafers."

The U.S. Army also had weaknesses. The soldiers arrayed against the Lakota and Cheyenne were primarily Civil War draftees or "galvanized Yankees"—Confederate soldiers captured by the Union who agreed to fight Indians on the frontier in exchange for their freedom. With the Civil War winding down in spring 1865, the soldiers wanted out of the army and were unenthusiastic about fighting Indians. Many soldiers deserted or threatened mutiny.

== Preliminary encounters ==
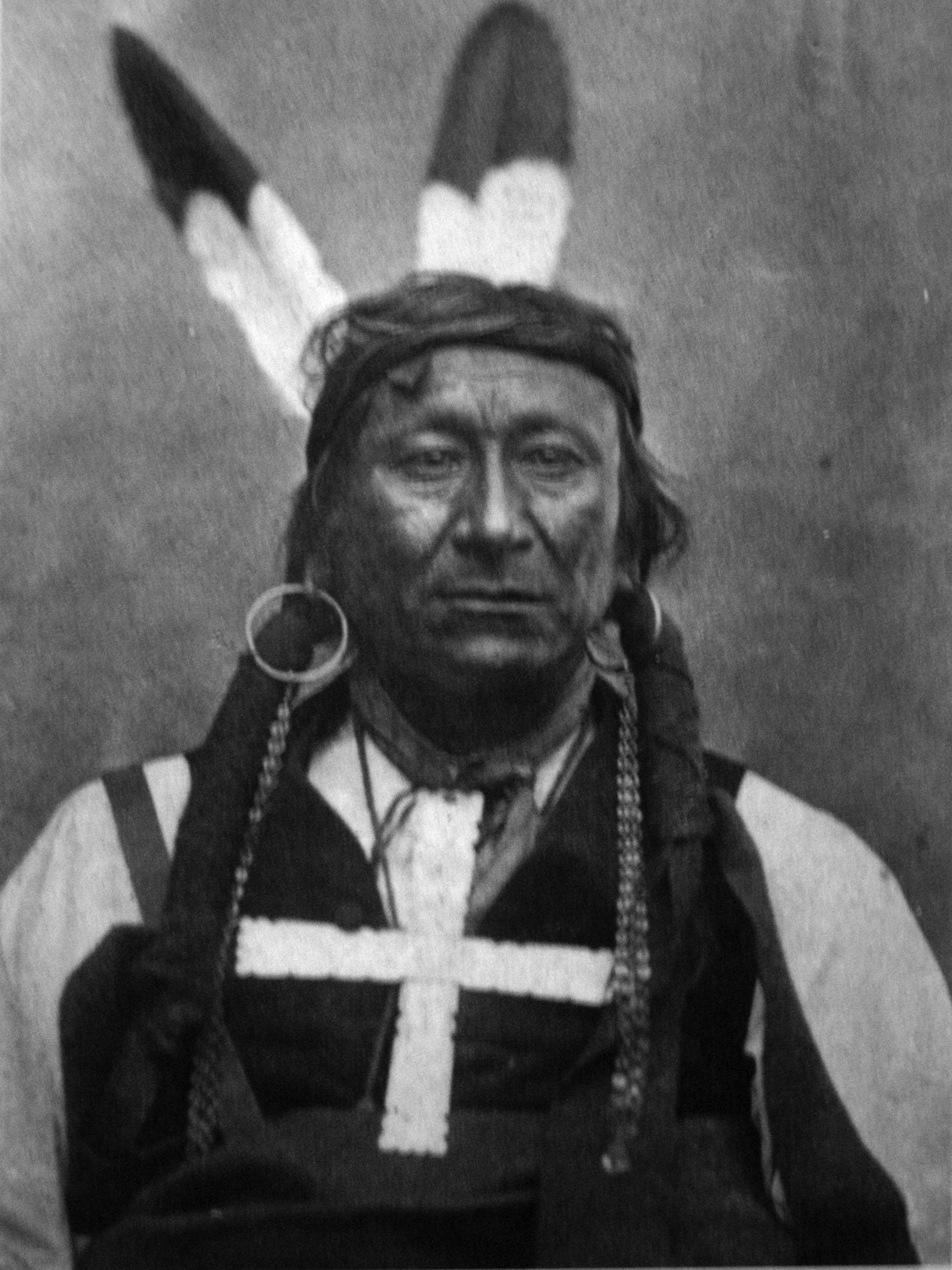
Young Man Afraid of His Horse, 1890. He was perhaps the most prominent of the Lakota leaders. The correct translation of his name is "They Fear His Horse."

Deer Creek Station. Mixed-blood Cheyenne/white George Bent joined a war party of 100 Cheyenne, divided about equally between the northern and southern branches of the tribe. Heading southward from their camp on the Powder River the Cheyennes reached the North Platte 28 miles east of the Platte River Bridge, near present-day Glenrock, Wyoming, on May 20. Two companies of U.S. cavalry, comprising about 100 men, were stationed at Deer Creek Station.

About 25 of the Cheyenne encountered and fought four soldiers about three miles upriver from the station. The Cheyenne were repulsed. Another band attacked a group of seven soldiers, killed one, and captured 26 horses. The soldiers claimed to have killed five Indians in these skirmishes. As is often the case, the Indian story is substantially different. Bent says the Cheyenne forded the flooded North Platte River and surprised the soldiers at Deer Creek Station, who refused to come out of their stockade. After exchanging fire with the soldiers and suffering no casualties, the Indians abandoned the attack and re-crossed the North Platte with their stolen horses. According to the official report of the army, a 25-man contingent of soldiers tracked the Indians to the river, but could not cross due to high water. Bent, to the contrary, said the soldiers stayed in their stockade and did not pursue the Indians. Before returning north to their villages, the Cheyenne reconnoitered the Platte River Bridge, exchanged a few shots with the soldiers guarding the bridge, and attacked a wagon train guarded by soldiers, capturing 250 mules.

Raids by Lakota took place on May 26 at Sweetwater Station and St. Mary's Station, west of Platte Bridge, prompting the army to close the Oregon Trail to civilian traffic on May 30.

Dry Creek. With the Oregon Trail closed to traffic, the Indians shifted their attention southward to the Overland Trail. On June 2, Fort Halleck, near present-day Elk Mountain, Wyoming learned of Indian attacks on stage stations to the west. He sent 32 soldiers to investigate and found three stage stations abandoned and all their employees holed up at Sulfur Springs Station, eighty miles west of Fort Halleck. The soldiers returned the civilian employees to their stations and left a detachment to guard each station. The Indians re-raided the stations and stole most of their livestock, leaving the soldiers on foot.

Meanwhile, the Indians tried to lure soldiers at Platte Bridge Station into an ambush. On June 3, they fired on the Station and Lt.Col. Preston B. Plumb, 11th Kansas Cavalry, and 22 soldiers sallied in pursuit of them. Near Dry Creek, the soldiers were ambushed by 60 Indians, but rescued by twenty additional cavalry went out to help them. Two soldiers were killed and they claimed to have killed one Indian. The builder of the bridge, an elderly civilian named Louis Guinard, disappeared. A boot containing part of his leg was found months later.

Sage Creek Station. On June 8, an estimated 100 Indians attacked the Sage Creek Station, west of Fort Halleck near present-day Saratoga, Wyoming. The five soldiers and 2 civilians in the station ran out of ammunition and attempted to flee eight miles west to Pine Grove Station with the Indians in pursuit. Five of them were killed. The Indians continued to raid in the area, killing two civilians but focusing on relieving the stagecoach stations of their livestock.

Yellowstone River Valley. Far to the north in the Yellowstone River valley of Montana, on June 9, Lakota (probably Hunkpapa) killed a Colonel Smith of the 14th Wisconsin Regiment. Subsequently, they killed eleven men near Fort Benton on the Missouri River.

Nearly daily attacks on isolated outposts, stagecoach stations, and wagon trains continued throughout June and into early July. Several additional soldiers and civilians were killed, the raids reaching as far south as the South Platte River near Julesburg, Colorado.

== Moonlight's mistakes ==
To respond to the raids, the commander at Fort Laramie, Colonel Thomas Moonlight, led a large force of 500 cavalry out of the fort to seek and punish the raiding Indians. He returned to the fort May 19, having found no Indians. In the words of a soldier, Moonlight "was hunting for them in [the] opposite direction [from] where their trail led."

On May 26, 1865, Moonlight hung two minor Oglala leaders, Two Face and Black Foot. A white woman, Lucinda Ewbanks, and her small child were discovered living in pitiful condition among the Oglala bands. They had been kidnapped by Cheyenne almost a year earlier and sold to the Oglala band of Two Face and Black Foot. Moonlight ordered the two Oglala hung. George Bent and others tell the story differently. Bent said the two Oglala ransomed the woman from the Cheyenne and brought her into the fort as a peace gesture. Moonlight, however, arrested and hung them, an action which Mrs. Ewbanks apparently protested. Experienced civilians at the fort warned Moonlight of repercussions. Their bodies, and that of a Cheyenne, were left hanging from the gallows for months for all visitors to the fort to see.

On June 3, the army fearing that the 1,500 Lakota, mostly Brulé, and Arapaho living near Fort Laramie, might become hostile, decided to move them about 300 miles east to Fort Kearny in Nebraska. The Indians protested that Fort Kearny was in the territory of their traditional enemies, the Pawnee. Moreover, they feared, with reason, there would be no food for them at Fort Kearny. The army insisted and the Indians, with an escort of 138 cavalrymen under Captain William D. Fouts, departed Fort Laramie on June 11. The soldier's mistreatment of Indian women and children caused the Lakota to turn hostile. The young Oglala warrior, Crazy Horse, slipped into the camp the night of June 13 and persuaded the Indians to flee the soldiers. The next day, near present-day Morrill, Nebraska, most of the Indians refused to accompany the soldiers and began crossing the North Platte River, assisted by Crazy Horse and a band of Oglalas on the other side. Attempting to stop them, Fouts and four soldiers were killed.

Informed of the disaster, Moonlight departed Fort Laramie with 234 cavalry to pursue the Indians. He traveled so fast that many of his men had to turn back because their horses were spent. On June 17, near present-day Harrison, Nebraska, the Lakota raided his horse herd and relieved him of most of his remaining horses. Moonlight and many of his men had to walk 60 miles back to Fort Laramie. He was severely criticized by his soldiers for being drunk and not setting a guard on his horses. On July 7, Moonlight was relieved of his command and mustered out of the army.

The Platte River bridge was a key crossing point of the North Platte River for wagon trains of emigrants traveling the Oregon and Bozeman Trails. The Indians especially wanted to halt traffic on the Bozeman Trail which led through the heart of their hunting territory. The bridge had been constructed in 1859 and was almost 1,000 feet long and 17 feet wide. On the south side of the river was the military post and stockade, staffed by 100 soldiers, a dozen or more armed civilians, a few Shoshoni scouts, and an office of the Overland Telegraph Company. The soldiers were low on ammunition.

On July 20, Indian leaders made their final decision to launch an attack against the bridge. The warriors gathered and set out southward from the mouth of Crazy Woman Creek on the Powder River. The Platte River Bridge was 115 miles south. The army was the largest Bent had ever seen. He estimated it to number 3,000 men. The war leaders included Red Cloud, Old Man Afraid Of His Horses and his son Young Man Afraid Of His Horses, Roman Nose, Dull Knife, Crazy Horse, and others. The march was "perfectly organized" with the undisciplined young men kept in check by warrior societies such as the Crazy Dogs and Dog Soldiers.

On July 24, the Indian army camped on a small stream a few miles from Platte Bridge. Scouts reconnoitered the area and the next morning the Indians advanced on foot toward the bridge, behind the cover of hills and on foot, leading their horses to avoid throwing up a dust cloud. A group of ten trusted warriors, including Crazy Horse, tried to induce soldiers from the stockade to cross the bridge and chase them to the hills where the Indians were hiding. But excited young warriors appeared on the horizon, spoiled the ambush, and frightened the soldiers away. Apparently Crazy Horse, a Cheyenne named High Back Wolf, and the other decoys, disgusted with the failure of their ambush, crossed the river, and galloped through two groups of soldiers, doing little damage but sending the soldiers scurrying back to the stockade. High Back Wolf was killed. Next morning, July 26, the Indians again attempted without success to decoy soldiers out of their stockade into an ambush; Charles Bent, brother of George, was among the decoys.

Meanwhile, before dawn on July 26, a detachment of 14 men of Company I, 3rd U.S. Volunteer Infantry led by Capt. Adam Smith Leib, escorted by 1st Lt. Henry C. Bretney and six (some accounts say 10) troopers of Company G, 11th Ohio Volunteer Cavalry, arrived from Sweetwater Station en route to Fort Laramie for supplies and a long-overdue payroll. Their arrival brought the complement of the station up to 120 soldiers. They found the station on 50% guard duty and molding bullets.

Leib advised the station commander, Major Martin Anderson of the 11th Kansas Cavalry, that he had earlier passed a small train of five empty mule-drawn wagons returning from Sweetwater to Laramie, 14 teamsters escorted by 11 enlisted men of the 11th Kansas. Knowing that the train was due to come in the next morning, the officers at the post discussed sending out a relief force to drive off the Cheyenne and Lakota warriors, so that the wagon train could come safely in. Leib and Bretney suggested an immediate march but Anderson decided to wait for daylight. Bretney, who had succeeded to command of Company G on February 13 when its captain, Levi M. Rinehart, had been accidentally killed by a drunken trooper during a skirmish, was not on good terms with Anderson. On his arrival at Platte Bridge on July 16, the Kansan had replaced Bretney as post commander and ordered Company G to relocate to Sweetwater Station, escorting the same wagon train now returning from there. In addition, the 11th Kansas Cavalry was due to march to Fort Kearney on or about August 1 to muster out of service.

After reveille, all four of Anderson's officers declined to lead the relief force and some placed themselves on the sick list to avoid the duty. 20-year-old 2nd Lt. Caspar W. Collins of Company G 11th Ohio Volunteer Cavalry, en route back to his company farther west from a remount detail at Fort Laramie, had arrived the afternoon before with the mail ambulance and was ordered by Anderson to lead the relief. Bretney had no authority to countermand the order but advised Collins to refuse it. Instead Collins borrowed Bretney's pistols and was given a mount from the regimental band.

At dawn numerous Indians were observed by sentinels on the surrounding hills observing the station. At 7:00 a.m. a larger force forded the river east of the station and rode just out of rifle range, taunting the garrison. Collins and a small detachment of 25 men of the 11th Kansas crossed the Platte Bridge at a walk, then formed into a column of fours and rode west along the north bank at a trot to drive off any hostile Indians. Behind him, a 30-man contingent of the 3rd U.S.V.I. and its 11th Ohio Volunteer Cavalry escort crossed the bridge on foot as a support force for Collins, forming a skirmish line after they observed 400 Cheyenne emerge from the sand hills and arroyos between themselves and Collins.

The Indians had concealed large bands of warriors near the bridge and over the crest of the hills, possibly as many as a thousand Lakota, Cheyenne and Arapaho. Collins wheeled his detachment into two lines and charged the first group to emerge, only to find himself heavily outnumbered. He then ordered a retreat to the bridge by breaking through the Cheyenne to his rear. Simultaneously, yet another large force, this of Lakota, rushed the bridge from the south. The skirmish line at the bridge held the Lakota at bay with volley fire until 21 of the 26 troopers with Collins, all wounded to some extent, fought their way through. Five were killed, including Collins, who was wounded in the hip and shot in the forehead with an arrow while trying to aid a wounded soldier.

Bretney in a rage returned to the stockade and accused the Kansas officers of cowardice when Anderson refused to allow a larger force and the howitzer to attempt another relief. Anderson placed Bretney under arrest and turned over the post's defenses to Leib, who had the garrison throw up an embrasure and dig rifle pits to protect the howitzer at the south end of the bridge. Disagreements also broke out among the Indians. Mitchell Lajeunesse, a mixed blood scout for the army, ventured out of the station just after the battle. He observed the Cheyenne accusing the Lakota of being cowards for not capturing the Platte Bridge and preventing the escape of the soldiers on the north side of the river. Warriors of the two tribes almost came to blows.

During the morning the attacking force destroyed a thousand feet of telegraph wire on the line to Fort Laramie before Anderson thought to request reinforcements, then drove off the detail of 11 soldiers sent to repair it, killing another trooper. Two Shoshone scouts were paid to take a message requesting reinforcements to the next telegraph station east, but the battle was over and the Indians had departed before relief arrived.

== Battle of Red Buttes ==
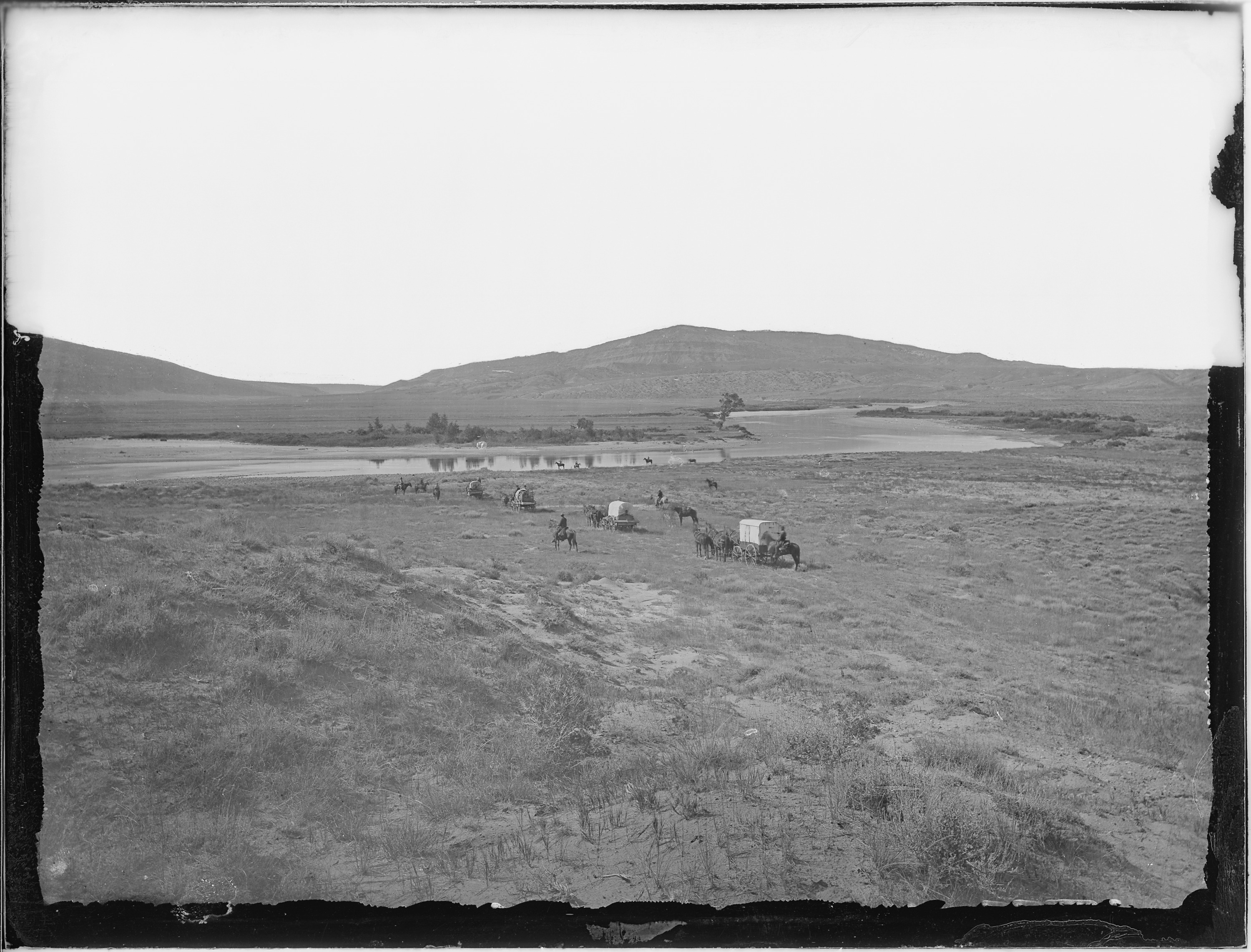
The Battle of Red Buttes took place in the flat area near the North Platte River. The Red Buttes are in the distance.

Sgt. Amos J. Custard was in charge of five wagons and 25 men coming from the west toward Platte Bridge Station. He was warned by a 30-man patrol of the 11th Ohio Cavalry that many Indians were in the area. The Ohioans had holed up behind a breastworks made of wagons. Custard declined to take cover with the Ohioans, saying "We have been South, where fighting is done, and we know how to do it." He and his men and wagons continued on to a point about five miles from and within sight of Platte Bridge Station where he heard the sounds of the station's cannon and the battle near the bridge. Custard sent out Corporal James A. Shrader and four troopers to investigate. They were cut off and pursued by a hundred Cheyenne led by the brother of Roman Nose, Left Hand, who was killed in the running fight. Eventually Shrader and two men made their way on foot into the station.

At the wagon train, with large numbers of Indians closing in, Custard organized the wagons into a corral near the river bank and beat off a first, disorganized assault. Indian leaders, including Roman Nose, arrived and took charge. Roman Nose and others rode their horses at top speed in a circle around the wagon train with the objective of depleting the soldier's ammunition. That accomplished, the Indians advanced, most of them on foot, and overran the train, killing all 22 of the soldiers in the corral. One teamster escaped.

U.S. army accounts state that the wagons were forced into a hollow where they held out for four hours, using fire from Spencer rifles to repel assaults until a large group closed on foot and overwhelmed the defenders, killing all. George Bent, a participant, said the fight lasted little more than half an hour. He gave grudging admiration to the soldiers who briefly stood off 1,000 Indians. Bent said eight Indians were killed in the battle and many wounded. By contrast, in the fight with Collins, the Indians had suffered "practically no loss."

== Aftermath ==
The day after the battle, the Indian army broke up into small groups and dispersed. A few remained near the Oregon Trail for raiding but most returned to their villages in the Powder River country for their summer buffalo hunt. Indians lacked the resources to keep an army in the field for an extended period of time. The achievements of the Indians, given that it was perhaps the largest Indian army ever assembled on the Great Plains, were rather meager. The planned offensive against Fort Rice in North Dakota came to naught. Army fatalities near Platte Station were 29 dead, including Lt. Collins, with at least ten seriously wounded. Historian Robert Utley estimated combined Indian casualties in the July actions around Platte Bridge Station as 60 killed and 130 wounded. That seems an improbably high estimate because George Bent wrote that only 8 Indians were killed at Red Buttes and that the Indians suffered few casualties near the Platte bridge. Indians were averse to taking casualties in offensive actions, usually withdrawing if they encountered heavy resistance.

The Army officially renamed Platte Bridge Station to Fort Caspar to honor Collins, using his given name to differentiate the post from an existing fort in Colorado named after Collins' father.

Although they were unaware of it at the time, the Indians were fortunate that they quickly broke off the campaign at Platte Bridge. An army of more than 2,000 soldiers, commanded by General Patrick E. Connor was being launched against them. The Powder River Expedition, as it was called, would penetrate to the heart of their country in August. By that time, most of the warriors who had participated in the Battle of Platte Bridge were back in their camps and well rested as were their horses. They successfully fended off Connor.

== See also ==
- List of battles won by Indigenous peoples of the Americas
