= 11th Kansas Cavalry Regiment =

11th Regiment Kansas Volunteer Cavalry
- Active: April 1863 – September 26, 1865
- Country: United States
- Allegiance: Union
- Branch: Cavalry
- Engagements: Second Battle of Lexington; Battle of Little Blue River; Second Battle of Independence; Battle of Byram's Ford; Battle of Westport; Battle of Mine Creek; Battle of Platte Bridge; Battle of Red Buttes

The 11th Kansas Volunteer Cavalry Regiment was a cavalry regiment that served in the Union Army during the American Civil War.

== Service ==
The 11th Kansas Cavalry was organized at Kansas City, Kansas in late April 1863 from the 11th Kansas Infantry, which ceased to exist. It mustered in for three years under the command of Colonel Thomas Ewing Jr.

The regiment was attached to District of the Border and District of Kansas, Department of the Missouri, until February 1865. District of Upper Arkansas to March 1865. 2nd Brigade, 2nd Division, VII Corps, Department of Arkansas, to April 1865. District of the Plains, Department of Missouri, to September 1865.

The 11th Kansas Cavalry mustered out of service at Fort Leavenworth on July 17, 1865.

== Detailed service ==
Assigned to duty on eastern border of Kansas until October 1864. Expedition from Salem to Mulberry Creek, Kansas, August 8–11, 1863 (detachment). Scout on Republican River, Kansas, August 19–24, 1863 (detachment). Operations against Quantrill on his raid into Kansas August 20–28. Independence, Missouri, August 25. (Companies C and F duty on southern border of Kansas December 1863 to August 1864.) Company L stationed at Fort Riley; Company G at Fort Leavenworth as body guard to General Samuel Curtis. Action at Scott's Ford, Missouri, October 14, 1863. Deep Water Creek, Missouri, October 15. Expedition into Missouri June 16–20, 1864. Scout from Salem to Mulberry Creek August 8–11 (detachment). Operations against Indians in Nebraska August 11-November 28 (1 company). Operations against Price in Missouri and Kansas. Lexington October 19. Little Blue October 21. Independence, Big Blue, and State Line October 22. Westport October 23. Cold Water Grove October 24. Mine Creek, Little Osage River, October 25. Regiment ordered to Fort Riley December 1864. Companies C and E to Fort Larned February 1865. Regiment moved to Fort Kearney, Nebraska, February 20-March 4, then moved to Fort Laramie March 6-April 9, and to Platte Bridge. Duty guarding telegraph lines and operating against Indians until June. Sage Creek, Dakota Territory, April 21. Deer Creek May 21. Platte Bridge, Dakota Territory, June 3. Companies A, B, E, F, L, and M moved to Fort Halleck June 11–24. Protect stage route from Camp Collins, Colorado, to Green River until August 13. White River, Dakota Territory, June 17. Rock Creek July 1. Fort Halleck July 4 and 26. Moved to Fort Leavenworth.

== Casualties ==
The regiment lost a total of 173 men during service; 61 enlisted men killed or mortally wounded, 2 officers and 110 enlisted men died of disease.

== Commanders ==
- Colonel Thomas Ewing Jr.
- Colonel Thomas Moonlight

== Notable members ==
- Captain Grenville Lew Gove, Company G - died of disease November 7, 1864; Gove County, Kansas is named in his honor
- Lieutenant Colonel Preston B. Plumb - U.S. Senator from Kansas (1877–1891)
- Private John C. Rooks, Company I - killed at the battle of Prairie Grove; Rooks County, Kansas is named in his honor
- Major Edmund G. Ross - printer and newspaperman, later a Republican U.S. Senator from Kansas who is most noted for his "no" vote against the 1868 impeachment of Andrew Johnson.

== See also ==
- 11th Regiment Kansas Volunteer Infantry
- List of Kansas Civil War Units
- Kansas in the Civil War
