= Edmund G. Ross =

American politician (1826–1907)

Edmund Gibson Ross
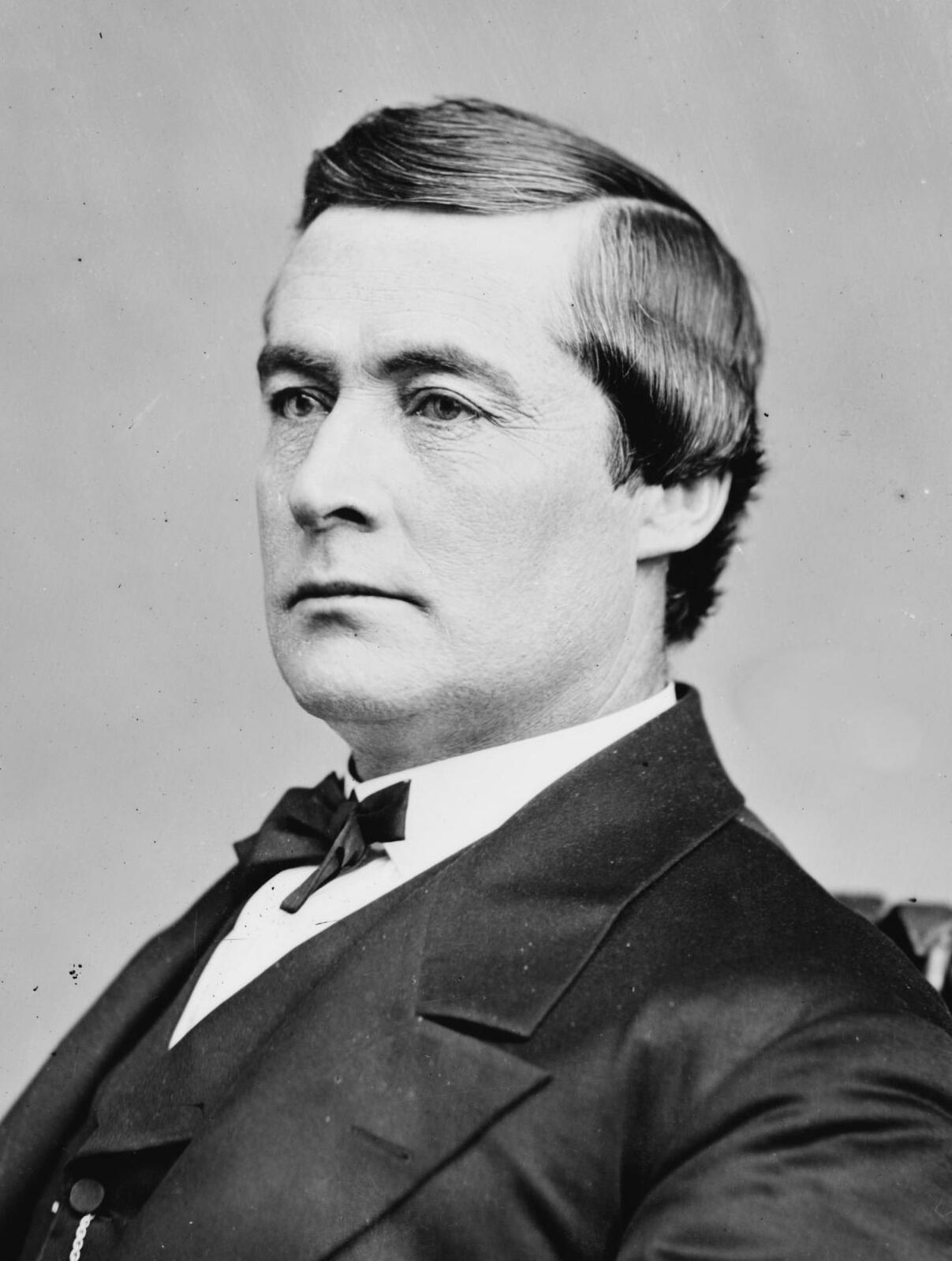
- Ross, c. 1860–1875

United States Senator from Kansas
- In office July 19, 1866 – March 3, 1871
- Preceded by: James H. Lane
- Succeeded by: Alexander Caldwell

12th Governor of New Mexico Territory
- In office May 5, 1885 – May 14, 1889
- Appointed by: Grover Cleveland
- Preceded by: Lionel Allen Sheldon
- Succeeded by: L. Bradford Prince

Personal details
- Born: December 7, 1826 Ashland, Ohio, U.S.
- Died: May 8, 1907 (aged 80) Albuquerque, New Mexico Territory, U.S.
- Party: Democratic; Republican (before 1872)
- Spouse: Fannie Lathrop (m. 1848)
- Profession: Newspaper editor and publisher

Military service
- Allegiance: United States of America
- Branch/service: Union Army
- Years of service: 1862–1865
- Rank: Major
- Unit: 11th Kansas Volunteer Cavalry Regiment
- Commands: Company E, 11th Kansas Volunteer Cavalry Regiment
- Battles/wars: American Civil War

Edmund Gibson Ross (December 7, 1826 – May 8, 1907) was an American politician who represented Kansas after the American Civil War and was later the governor of New Mexico Territory. At the 1868 impeachment trial of Andrew Johnson his vote against convicting President Johnson of "high crimes and misdemeanors" allowed Johnson to stay in office by the margin of one vote. As the seventh of seven Republican U.S. Senators to break with his party, he proved to be the person whose decision would result in conviction or acquittal. When he chose the latter, the vote of 35–19 in favor of Johnson's conviction failed to reach the required two-thirds vote. Ross lost his bid for re-election two years later.

== Early life ==
Ross was born in Ashland, Ohio, on December 7, 1826, the third of fourteen children born to Sylvester Ross Sr. and Cynthia (Rice) Ross. He was educated locally and at age 11 was apprenticed as a printer at the Huron, Ohio, Commercial Advertiser. In 1841 he moved to Sandusky, Ohio, to join the staff of the Sandusky Mirror, which was owned by his brother Sylvester. For several years in the late 1840s and early 1850s, Ross was employed as a journeyman printer and typesetter, traveling throughout Ohio and to several nearby states to accept temporary work whenever it was available. A Democrat who opposed slavery, in 1852, he moved to Milwaukee, Wisconsin, where he worked on first the Milwaukee Free Democrat and then the Milwaukee Daily Sentinel. In 1854, Ross was one of several Milwaukee residents who came to the aid of Joshua Glover, an escaped slave who had been recaptured and was being held at the local jail. The group stormed the jail, freed Glover, and enabled his escape to Canada. At the founding of the Republican Party, Ross' anti-slavery leanings caused him to join the new organization.

== Early career ==
An opponent of slavery, during the 1850s dispute over whether to admit Kansas to the union as a free state or a slave state, Ross moved to Topeka, Kansas, as did several of his family members, who were also opponents of slavery. The dispute sometimes resulted in violence, and Ross joined the antislavery side's militia. He became a leader of the free state movement as publisher of the Topeka Tribune from 1856 to 1858 and founder of the Kansas State Record in 1859. He joined the board of directors of the Atchison, Topeka & Santa Fe Railway and was one of its chief promoters. In 1859, Ross was elected a delegate to the Kansas constitutional convention of 1859 to 1861.

== Military service ==
A supporter of the Union during the Civil War, Ross joined the Union Army as a private in 1862. He was commissioned as a captain in command of Company E, 11th Kansas Volunteer Cavalry Regiment. The regiment took part in several battles in the southwestern and western United States, including Second Battle of Lexington, Battle of Little Blue River, Second Battle of Independence, Battle of Byram's Ford, Battle of Westport, Battle of Mine Creek, and Battle of Platte Bridge Station/Battle of Red Buttes. He was promoted to major during the war and was mustered out after the surrender of the Confederacy in 1865.

== United States Senator ==
After the war, Ross returned to Kansas to continue his newspaper career and was editor of the Kansas Tribune from 1865 to 1866. In 1866, the governor of Kansas appointed Ross to the U.S. Senate as a Republican, filling the vacancy caused by the death of James H. Lane. The state legislature subsequently elected him to complete Lane's term, and he served from July 19, 1866, to March 3, 1871. He was an unsuccessful candidate for reelection to the term which began on March 4, 1871. During his Senate service, Ross served as chairman of the Committee on Enrolled Bills (Fortieth Congress) and the Committee on Engrossed Bills (Forty-first Congress).

=== Andrew Johnson impeachment ===
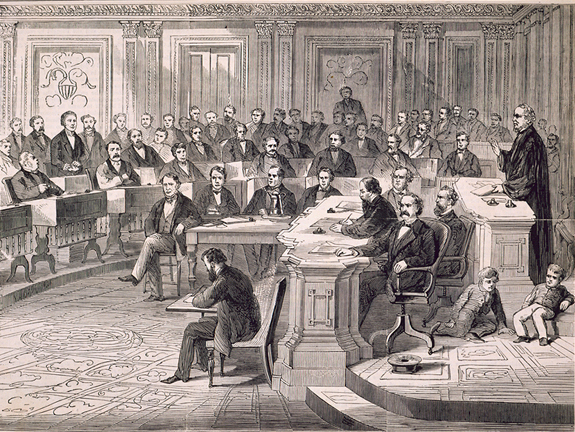
Illustration published in Frank Leslie's Illustrated Newspaper of Senator Ross casting his vote against conviction on the eleventh article of impeachment during the impeachment trial of Andrew Johnson

Ross is best known for casting the decisive vote which acquitted Andrew Johnson during his 1868 presidential impeachment trial. Some people have claimed that Ross voted against the conviction due to concerns about his colleague Samuel C. Pomeroy receiving patronage from Benjamin Wade, and as a means to receive patronage favors from Johnson. Others claim Ross cast his vote because he genuinely believed that Johnson had the right to replace Edwin M. Stanton, since he had been appointed during the Lincoln Administration. Still others give voice to the opinion that, though the Kansas Senator did believe Johnson guilty of breaking the Tenure of Office Act, he did not believe that offense worthy of impeachment. Kansas newspapers thought clearly that Ross voted against his radical leanings in supporting Johnson because of the influence of his old Civil War colonel, Thomas Ewing Jr., an ardent Johnson supporter at the time. Later in life, Ewing wrote Ross that he felt Ross was "preeminent for courage" among men—not only for his physical courage in battle but also for opposing Johnson's conviction. "In making [that] decision, you knew perfectly well that it could consign you to private life and the vehement denunciation of almost all your party friends." However, there is significant evidence that suggests Ross was bribed, although a subsequent House of Representatives investigation found no proof.

Edmund G. Ross is one of eight U.S. Senators featured in Profiles in Courage, the 1956 Pulitzer Prize-winning history co-written by then-Senator John F. Kennedy in commemoration of past acts of political courage in Congress.

== Later career ==
Upon retirement from the Senate, Ross went back into the newspaper business briefly, launching a publication in Coffeyville, Kansas. He left the Republican Party after 1872 and was affiliated with the Democrats. In 1880, he ran unsuccessfully for governor of Kansas. A trip to New Mexico in 1882 had a positive effect on his health and he moved there permanently. He studied law and passed the bar, afterwards practicing in Albuquerque and beginning work on a history of the Johnson impeachment.

From 1885 to 1889, Ross served as governor of New Mexico Territory, appointed by President Grover Cleveland. He served as secretary of the New Mexico Bureau of Immigration from 1894 to 1896. In 1896, he published his book History of the Impeachment of Andrew Johnson. Time caused Kansans to look on Ross more favorably with respect to his role in the Johnson impeachment. In 1907, General Hugh Cameron of Lawrence visited Ross in New Mexico and brought testimonials from many citizens of Kansas.

== Death ==
Ross died in Albuquerque, New Mexico, on May 9, 1907. He was interred at Fairview Memorial Park Cemetery in Albuquerque.

== Family ==
In 1848, Ross married Fannie Lathrop (1827–1899) in Sandusky, Ohio. Their children included Lillian, Arthur, Pitt, Flynt, Edmundie, Kay and Fannie.

== Footnotes ==
Party political offices
Preceded by John R. Goodin	Democratic nominee for Governor of Kansas; 1880	Succeeded by George Washington Glick
U.S. Senate
Preceded by James H. Lane	U.S. senator (Class 2) from Kansas; July 19, 1866 – March 3, 1871; Served alongside: Samuel C. Pomeroy	Succeeded by Alexander Caldwell
Political offices
Preceded by Lionel Allen Sheldon	Governor of New Mexico Territory; 1885–1889	Succeeded by L. Bradford Prince
