= 11th Kansas Infantry Regiment =

- Active: August 29, 1862 – April 1863
- Country: United States
- Allegiance: Union
- Branch: Infantry
- Equipment: M1818 Prussian muskets
- Engagements: Battle of Old Fort Wayne; Battle of Prairie Grove

The 11th Kansas Infantry Regiment was an infantry regiment that served in the Union Army during the American Civil War.

== Service ==
The 11th Kansas Infantry was organized at Camp Lyon near Fort Leavenworth, Kansas, from August 29 through September 14, 1862. It mustered in for three years under the command of Colonel Thomas Ewing Jr.

The regiment moved to Fort Scott, Kansas, October 4–9, 1862, then to Pea Ridge, Arkansas, October 15–19. It was attached to 1st Brigade, 1st Division, Army of the Frontier, Department of Missouri, to February 1863. District of Rolla, Department of Missouri and District of Kansas, Department of Missouri, to April 1863.

The 11th Kansas Infantry ceased to exist at the end of April 1863 when it was mounted and changed to the 11th Kansas Cavalry.

== Detailed service ==
Action at Old Fort Wayne or Beattie's Prairie, near Maysville, October 22, 1862. Cane Hill, Boston Mountains, November 28. Boston Mountains December 4–6. Reed's Mountain December 6. Battle of Prairie Grove December 7. Expedition over Boston Mountains to Van Buren December 27–31. Moved to Springfield, Missouri, January 1863, and duty there until February 17. Moved to Forsyth, Missouri, then to Fort Scott, Kansas. On furlough March. Moved from Fort Scott to Salem, Missouri, then to Kansas City, Missouri, April 6–20.

== Commanders ==
- Colonel Thomas Ewing Jr.

== Notable members ==
- Captain Henry Booth - organized Pawnee County, Kansas, and later became Speaker of the Kansas House of Representatives
- 2nd Lieutenant Preston B. Plumb - U.S. Senator from Kansas (1877–1891)
- Private John C. Rooks - killed at the battle of Prairie Grove; Rooks County, Kansas, is named in his honor
- Captain Edmund Ross - U.S. Senator from Kansas (1866–1870)

== See also ==
- 11th Regiment Kansas Volunteer Cavalry
- List of Kansas Civil War Units
- Kansas in the Civil War
