= Thomas Ewing Jr. =

American general (1829–1896)

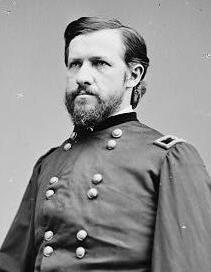
- General Thomas Ewing Jr.

Member of the U.S. House of Representatives from Ohio
- In office March 4, 1877 – March 3, 1881
- Preceded by: Ansel T. Walling
- Succeeded by: John B. Rice
- Constituency: 12th district (1877–1879); 10th district (1879–1881)

Personal details
- Born: August 7, 1829 Lancaster, Ohio
- Died: January 21, 1896 (aged 66) New York City, New York
- Resting place: Oakland Cemetery, Yonkers, New York

Military service
- Allegiance: United States of America; Union
- Branch/service: United States Army; Union Army
- Years of service: 1862 – 1865
- Rank: Brevet Major General
- Battles/wars: American Civil War; Battle of Old Fort Wayne; Battle of Cane Hill; Battle of Prairie Grove; Battle of Fort Davidson

Thomas Ewing Jr. (August 7, 1829 – January 21, 1896) was an attorney, the first chief justice of Kansas and leading free state advocate, Union Army general during the American Civil War, and two-term United States Congressman from Ohio, 1877–1881. He narrowly lost the 1879 campaign for Ohio Governor.

== Early life and career ==
Ewing was born in Lancaster, Ohio. His father, Thomas Ewing Sr., was a very successful lawyer and Whig politician at the national level. Although Ewing Sr. was an Irish Protestant, his wife, Maria Wills Boyle, converted the family to Catholicism. The younger Ewing was a foster brother of William Tecumseh Sherman and became his brother-in-law when Sherman married Ewing's sister, Eleanor "Ellen" Ewing Sherman. Two other brothers were also Civil War generals—Charles Ewing and Hugh Boyle Ewing. Thomas Ewing Jr.'s relationship with Sherman was close throughout their lives.

Thomas Ewing Jr. began his education at Brown University in Providence, Rhode Island. He left Brown University to become private secretary to President Zachary Taylor from 1849 to 1850 (concurrent with his father's term in Taylor's Cabinet). He then studied and practiced law from 1852 to 1856 in Cincinnati, Ohio. He graduated from Cincinnati Law School in 1855.

Ewing married Ellen Cox of Piqua, Ohio on January 18, 1856. He moved to Leavenworth, Kansas in 1856, where he became a member of the Leavenworth Constitutional Convention of 1858. He was a stockholder and leading advocate of a transcontinental railroad through his early ownership of the Leavenworth, Pawnee and Western Railroad, which was later sold to other investors and became part of the Union Pacific Railroad. A moderate on the issue of slavery, his efforts to defeat the Lecompton Constitution helped Kansas enter the Union as a free state but without the bloody fight against the federal government advocated by other free state men like James H. Lane and John Brown. He was a delegate from Kansas to the Peace Conference of 1861 and was elected the first chief justice of the new state of Kansas in 1861.

== Civil War ==
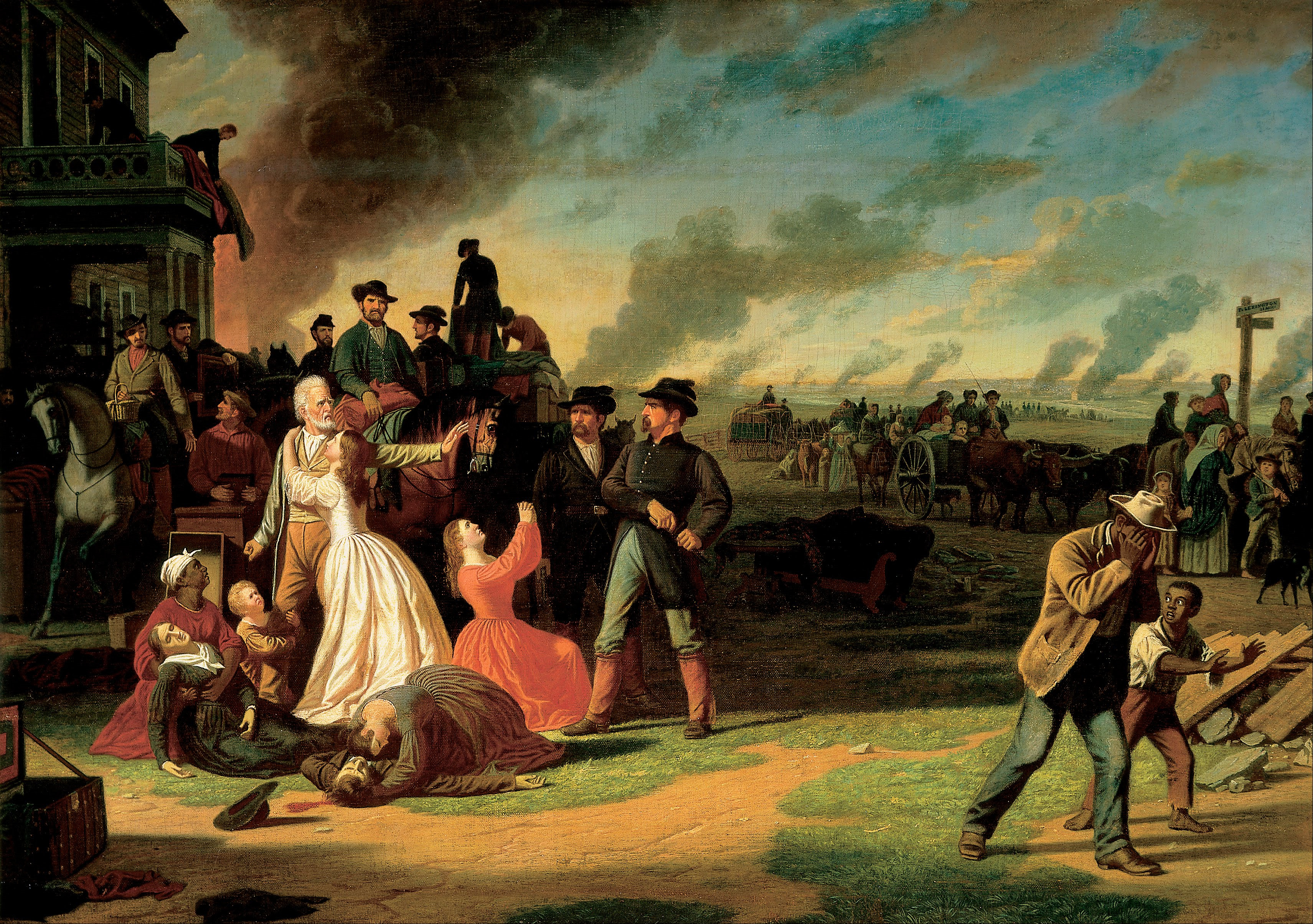
George Caleb Bingham painting of General Order No. 11. In this famous propaganda work, General Thomas Ewing is seated on a horse watching the Red Legs.

Ewing resigned his judgeship in 1862 to enter the military. He recruited the 11th Kansas Infantry and was elected as its first colonel. His regiment fought in James G. Blunt's division in the battles of Old Fort Wayne, Cane Hill, and Prairie Grove.

Although he possessed no military experience before the Civil War, Ewing was promoted to brigadier general on March 13, 1863, for his leadership at the Battle of Prairie Grove. He was given command of the District of the Border, which comprised Kansas and western Missouri. Ewing was responsible for General Order № 11, issued in retaliation for William Quantrill's raid on Lawrence, Kansas, where 450 raiders shot and killed 150 men and boys. The order commanded that civilians with southern sympathies living in four Missouri counties be expelled, and if they did not leave voluntarily, they would be forced out by Union cavalry. While this was part of an effort to suppress bushwhackers in the region, it left a black mark on his legacy.

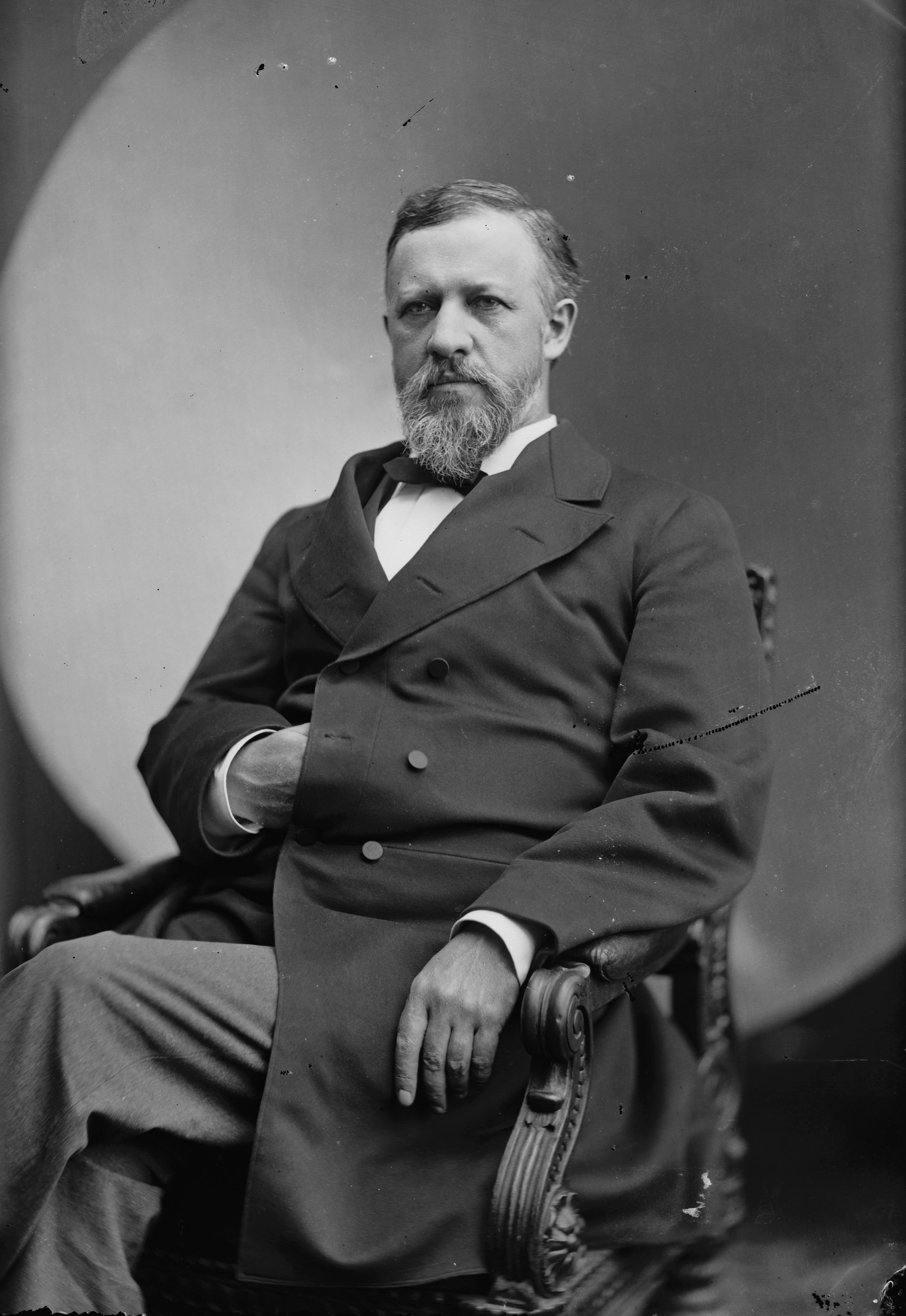
Thomas Ewing Jr.

In September and October 1864, as deputy commander of the St. Louis district under William Rosecrans, Ewing played a major part in thwarting Sterling Price's invasion of Missouri by commanding a successful defense at Fort Davidson at Pilot Knob, Missouri. His command of 1500 heavily outnumbered soldiers (900 effectives) and a few black civilians fought off repeated attacks from a force of about 15,000 Confederates, buying additional time for the Union army to strengthen the defenses around St. Louis. Instead of surrendering, Ewing and his men successfully eluded Price's force during the night and fought a fighting withdrawal to Rolla, Missouri. On February 23, 1865, Ewing resigned to return to civilian life, tendering his resignation directly to his good friend, the President, a month before Lincoln's assassination. On February 24, 1866, President Andrew Johnson nominated Ewing for appointment to the brevet rank of major general of volunteers to rank from March 13, 1865, and the U.S. Senate confirmed the nomination on May 4, 1866.

== Postbellum career ==
Although a staunch friend and ally of Abraham Lincoln, when Edwin Stanton engaged in a post-assassination flap with Ewing's brother-in-law William T. Sherman over final surrender terms to the Southern armies, Ewing agreed to represent two of John Ford's (of Ford's theater) employees in the Lincoln conspiracy trials. Through Orville Browning, Ewing's Washington law partner, Dr. Samuel Mudd's family also sought Ewing's legal help. Ewing also represented Samuel Arnold and Edmund Spangler during the trial. Ewing's efforts kept all three men from the gallows, but other conspirators were hanged. For their roles in the assassination, Mudd, Arnold and Spangler were sentenced to federal prison at Fort Jefferson in the Dry Tortugas off Key West, Florida.

From 1865 to 1870, Ewing practiced law in Washington, D.C., helping southern interests with his influence in the Johnson Administration. The Ewing family was heavily involved in defending Andrew Johnson against radical impeachment efforts. He declined President Johnson's offer for him to become the Secretary of War during the Tenure in Office crisis. Ewing successfully lobbied the key vote against the impeachment of Andrew Johnson when he convinced his old comrade in arms, Edmund G. Ross of Kansas, to vote against impeachment. Ewing was also successful in obtaining a pardon for Mudd at the end of Johnson's term.

In 1870, he returned to his native Lancaster, Ohio, where he practiced for the next decade and attempted several business investments in railroads and telegraph companies. Ewing was a member of the Ohio state Constitutional Convention of 1873 – 74.

=== Congress ===
In 1876, he was elected as a Democrat to the United States House of Representatives and was re-elected in 1878, serving in the 45th and 46th Congresses from 1877 until 1881. He prepared the bill establishing a Bureau of Labor Statistics, opposed the presence of U.S. soldiers at election polling places, and favored the re-monetization of silver and the continuation of the use of Greenback currency, becoming one of the leading national spokesmen for the Greenback Party.

=== Campaign for governor ===
In 1879, Ewing was defeated for election for Governor of Ohio as the Democratic candidate in a close election. There is scholarly controversy over whether the use of George Caleb Bingham's painting General Order № 11 in the anti-Ewing campaign made the difference in the election.

On March 3, 1881, Ewing closed his second term as representative in Congress and moved to New York to resume his law career. He never ran for office again.

=== Later career ===
Ewing was founder and first president of the Ohio Society of New York, a trustee of Ohio Soldiers' and Sailors' Orphans' Home (1874–78), and a trustee of Ohio University (1878–83). He served as Vice President of the Cincinnati Law School in 1881. Ewing made a notable address before the Marietta Centennial Convention of 1887, and one before the Kansas state bar association in 1890. He also contributed an article entitled "The Struggle for Freedom in Kansas" to The Cosmopolitan in May 1894. Brown University, by special vote in 1894, gave him the bachelor's degree dating back to the class of 1856. Georgetown College gave him the degree of LL.D. in 1870. Ewing was killed when struck by a New York City omnibus driver in 1896. He is buried in the Oakland Cemetery in Yonkers, New York.

== See also ==
- List of American Civil War generals (Union)
- Bleeding Kansas
- Battle of Pilot Knob
- General Order No. 11 (1863)
- Lawrence massacre

== Notes ==
U.S. House of Representatives
Preceded by Ansel T. Walling	Member of the U.S. House of Representatives from Ohio's 12th congressional district March 4, 1877 – March 3, 1879	Succeeded by Henry S. Neal
Preceded by Charles Foster	Member of the U.S. House of Representatives from Ohio's 10th congressional district March 4, 1879 – March 3, 1881	Succeeded by John B. Rice
Party political offices
Preceded by Richard M. Bishop	Democratic Party nominee for Governor of Ohio; 1879	Succeeded by John W. Bookwalter
