= Price's Missouri Expedition =

1864 military campaign of the American Civil War

- Part of the American Civil War
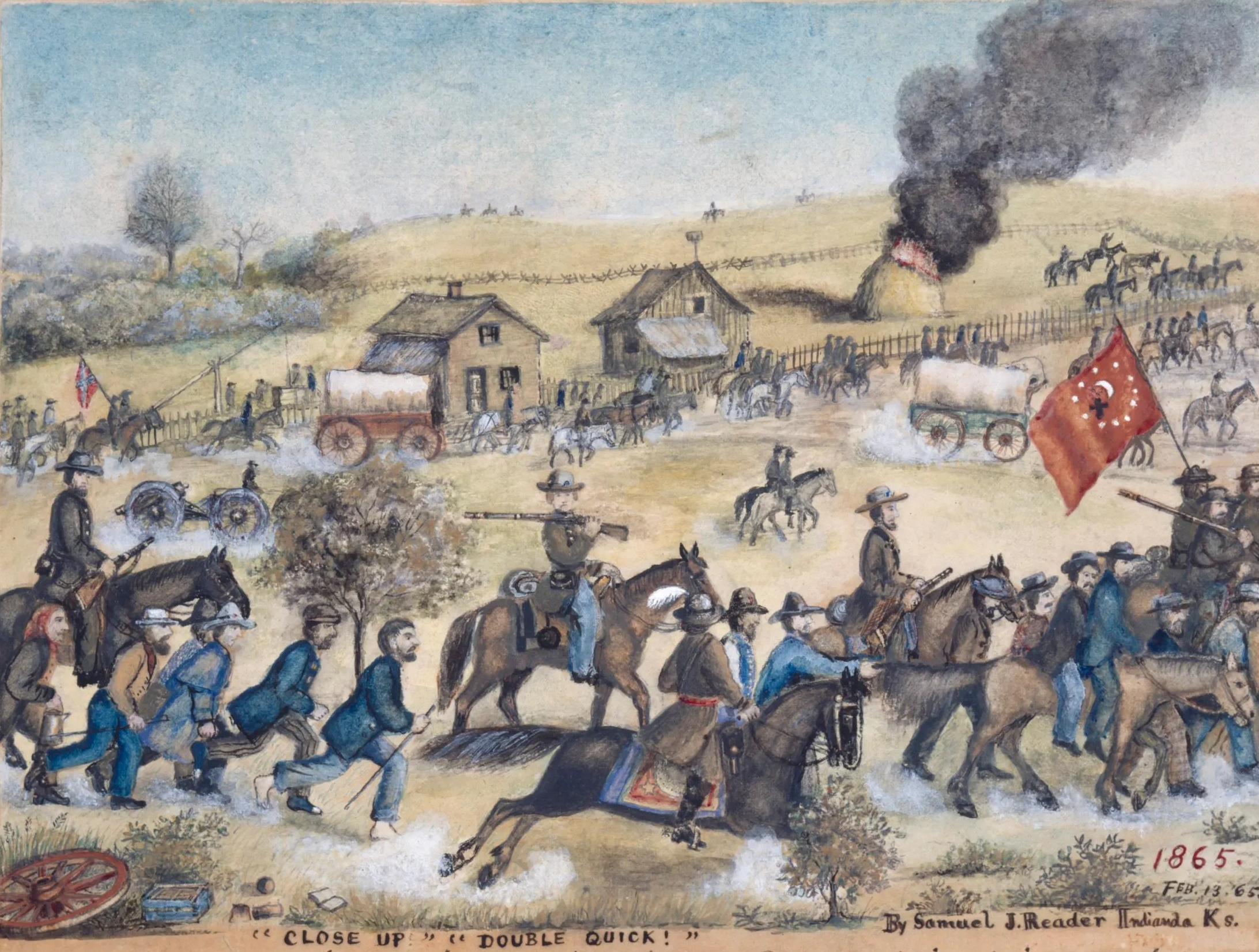
- The Price Raid by Samuel J. Reader
- Operational scope: Strategic offensive
- Location: Arkansas, Missouri, Kansas, Indian Territory, and Texas
- Commanded by: (Confederate States of America) Maj. Gen. Sterling Price
- Date: August 29 – December 2, 1864 (3 months and 3 days)
- Executed by: Army of Missouri
- Outcome: Union victory

Price's Missouri Expedition (August 29 – December 2, 1864), also known as Price's raid or Price's Missouri raid, was an unsuccessful Confederate cavalry raid through Arkansas, Missouri, and Kansas in the Trans-Mississippi Theater of the American Civil War. Led by Confederate Major General Sterling Price, the campaign aimed to recapture Missouri and renew the Confederate initiative in the larger conflict.

Despite several early victories, Price was ultimately defeated at the Battle of Westport by Union forces under Major General Samuel R. Curtis in late October. He suffered further reverses at the hands of Union cavalry under Major General Alfred Pleasonton at the Battle of Mine Creek, Kansas, forcing him to retreat back into Arkansas. Price's Missouri Expedition proved to be the last significant Southern operation west of the Mississippi River. Its failure bolstered confidence in an ultimate Union victory in the war, thereby contributing to President Abraham Lincoln's re-election. It also cemented Federal control over the hotly contested border state of Missouri.

== Background ==
After three years of bloody fighting, Confederate authorities were becoming desperate as the U.S. presidential election approached during the fall of 1864. The Union controlled the key western rivers and cities, Sherman was moving through Georgia, and Lee was tied down to the defense of Richmond. With foreign recognition now hopeless, Abraham Lincoln's re-election would be disastrous for their cause.

Earlier that summer, the Confederacy had ordered General E. Kirby Smith, commander of the Trans-Mississippi Department, to send a corps under Lieutenant General Richard Taylor across the Mississippi River to assist in the defense of Atlanta and Mobile. Such a crossing was impossible because of Union gunboat patrols on the river and Taylor was assigned to other duties.

Inspired by preparations to divert Union attention from Taylor's crossing, Smith came up with another plan. He would recapture Missouri for the Confederacy, in the hope that it would help turn Northern opinion against Lincoln. He ordered Missouri-native Sterling Price to invade his home state and advance on St. Louis, capturing the city and its military arsenals. If St. Louis was too heavily defended, Price was to turn west and capture Jefferson City, the state capital. Price was then told to cross into Kansas and turn south through the Indian Territory, "sweeping that country of its mules, horses, cattle, and military supplies".

== Opposing forces ==
Price assembled a force he named the Army of Missouri, consisting of 12,000 men and fourteen artillery pieces. His army was divided into three divisions under Maj. Gen. James F. Fagan, Maj. Gen. John S. Marmaduke, and Brig. Gen. Joseph O. "Jo" Shelby. However, the infantry units originally assigned to Price were ordered to the Western Theater, changing his mission from a full-fledged invasion into a cavalry raid.

Key commanders
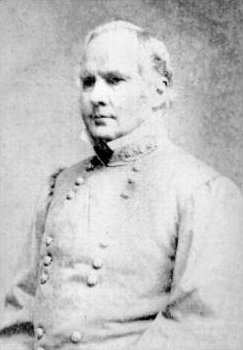
Maj. Gen.
Sterling Price,
CSA

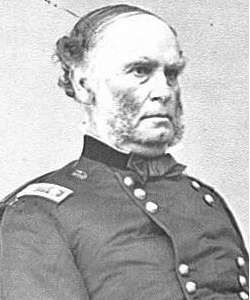
Maj. Gen.
Samuel R. Curtis,
USA

Price's men were a mixture of the best and the worst, a full quarter of them being deserters who had been returned to duty. Hundreds of Price's men marched barefoot, and most lacked basic equipment such as canteens and cartridge boxes. Many carried jugs for water and kept their ammunition in shirt and pants pockets. Nevertheless, Price hoped the people of Missouri would rally to his side. In this he proved to be mistaken, as most Missourians did not wish to become involved in the conflict. Only mounted bands of pro-Confederate guerrillas joined his army, perhaps as many as 6,000 altogether.

The Union Army in Missouri included thousands of Missouri State Militia cavalry, which would play a key role in defeating Price, together with the XVI Corps of Maj. Gen. Andrew J. Smith. These were augmented by Maj. Gen. Alfred Pleasonton's cavalry division, detached from William S. Rosecrans's Department of Missouri. As Price commenced his campaign, Smith's corps was on naval transports leaving Cairo, Illinois, to join Gen. William T. Sherman's army in Georgia; Rosecrans requested these troops be assigned to Missouri to deal with the threat, and Army Chief of Staff Henry W. Halleck immediately complied. By mid-October, more troops had arrived from the Kansas border under Maj. Gen. Samuel R. Curtis, Price's old adversary at the Battle of Pea Ridge and commander of the newly activated Army of the Border. Curtis commanded the divisions of Maj. Gen. James G. Blunt (cavalry), Maj. Gen. George W. Dietzler (Kansas Militia), Pleasonton's cavalry, and two infantry divisions from Smith's corps under Colonels Joseph J. Woods and David C. Moore—about 35,000 men in all. The Confederates were already greatly outnumbered.

== Battles ==
Price departed on his horse, Bucephalus, from Camden, Arkansas, on August 28, 1864. The following day he linked up with two divisions in Princeton, and then a third in Pocahontas on September 13. His combined force entered Missouri on September 19. Although Missouri pro-Union militia skirmished with the invading force almost daily, Price's first full battle did not come until September 27, at Pilot Knob, southwest of St. Louis in Iron County.

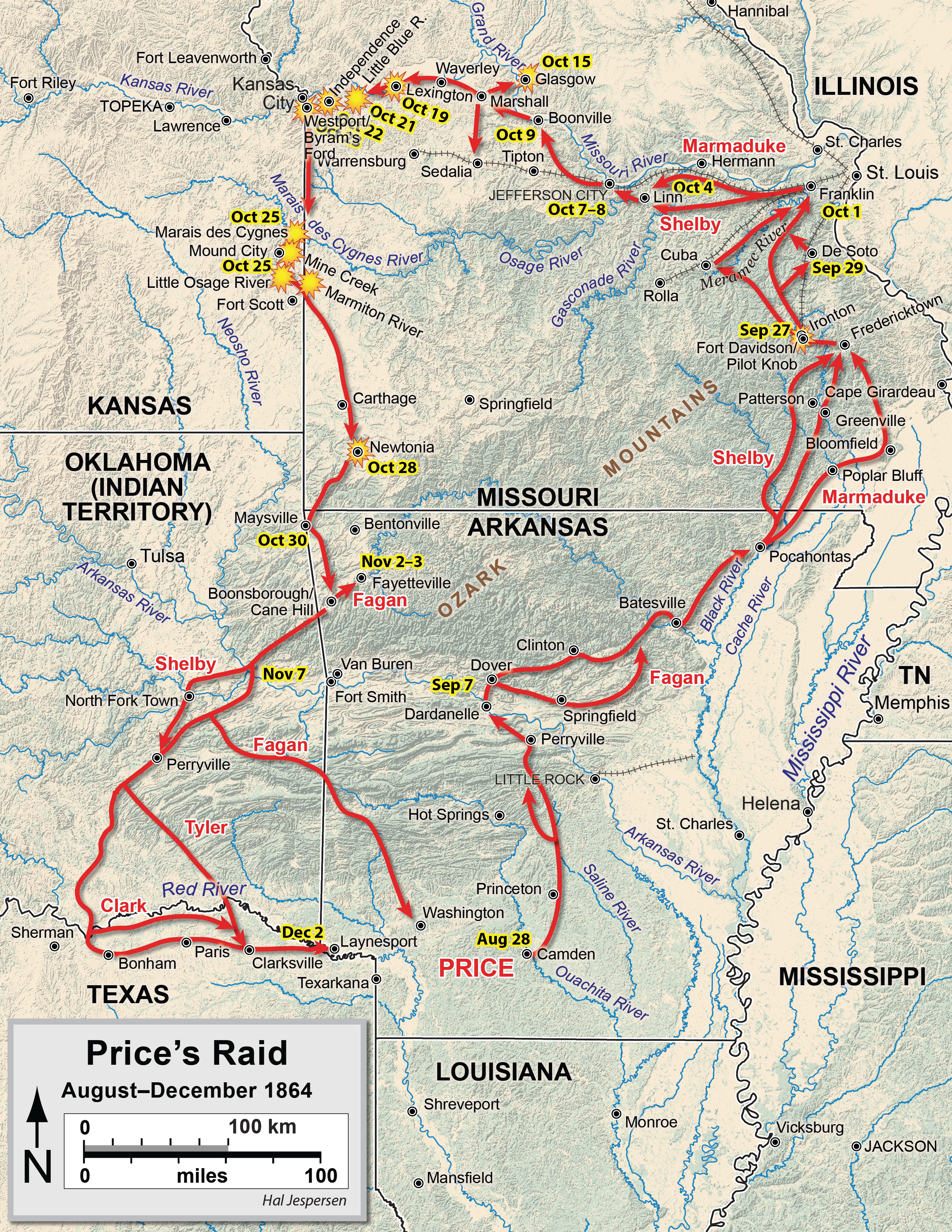
Map of Price's raid

Price's Missouri Expedition included the following battles:

Fort Davidson (September 27, 1864)
Having learned of Price's entry into Missouri, Union Brigadier General Thomas Ewing, Jr. moved down the railroad with reinforcements from St. Louis to Ironton to retard Price's advance. Price attacked Ewing's force on the morning of September 27, driving the Federals back into Fort Davidson, a redoubt of earthworks and wooden palisades near a hill called Pilot Knob. After maneuvering elements of his army onto the hills surrounding the fort, Price launched repeated assaults in the late afternoon hours, suffering horrific casualties. During the night, the Federals quietly evacuated the fort and then blew up its powder magazine with a timed fuse. Price had taken the fort, but he had paid a high price in lives and ammunition, giving the Union forces the time necessary to concentrate and oppose his expedition, while gaining little of any lasting military value.
That same day, 130 miles (210 km) to the northwest, a band of pro-Confederate guerrillas led by William "Bloody Bill" Anderson sacked the town of Centralia, executing 24 unarmed Union soldiers in the infamous Centralia Massacre. Anderson, an associate of the notorious bushwhacker Col. William C. Quantrill, was accompanied by Frank and Jesse James. In response to these events XVI Corps now moved to St. Louis, reinforced by Pleasonton. Seeing that his primary target of St. Louis was too strongly defended to take, Price turned west toward Jefferson City. He eventually discovered, however, that the capital was also too heavily fortified, and he bypassed it and continued west toward Kansas City, Missouri.
Glasgow (October 15)
Price sent a detachment under Generals Shelby and John Bullock Clark, Jr. to Glasgow to capture weapons and military supplies said to be in an arms warehouse there. The Confederate artillery opened fire before dawn on October 15, and Shelby's horse soldiers advanced on Glasgow, forcing the defenders back toward their fortifications on Hereford Hill, where they formed a defensive line. Convinced he could not withstand another attack, Union Colonel Chester Harding surrendered about 1:30 p.m. Harding had been able to destroy some military stores, but Price's men located muskets, overcoats, and army horses. The Confederates rested in town for three days before rejoining the main column marching on Kansas City. This victory and the captured supplies boosted the morale of Price's army, but Price's delaying at Glasgow, combined with his slow progress along the Missouri River, gave his enemies enough time to unite their forces and to decide how to defeat Price's Confederates.
Lexington (October 19)
As Price's army continued to creep slowly west, Maj. Gen. William S. Rosecrans, commanding the Department of the Missouri, proposed a pincer movement to surround and trap his enemy. However, he was unable to contact Maj. Gen. Samuel R. Curtis, commander of the Department of Kansas, to formalize the plan. In any event, Curtis was having problems of his own, since many of his men were Kansas militia and they refused to serve in Missouri. A force of 2,000 under Major General James G. Blunt finally set out for Lexington, Missouri, about 30 miles (50 km) east of Kansas City. On October 19, Price's army approached Lexington, colliding with Union scouts and pickets at about 2:00 p.m. The Confederates quickly forced them back, then engaged the main Federal force. The Union troops resisted for a time, but Price's men finally drove them through the town to the western outskirts, pursuing them along the Independence Road until nightfall. Without Curtis's force, Rosecrans could not stop Price's army, but he did retard their sluggish march. Blunt also gained valuable information on the size and disposition of Price's army.
Little Blue (October 21)
On October 20, Blunt's retreating troops arrived on the Little Blue River, 8 miles (13 km) east of Independence. The Union force turned to engage the Confederates once again, using a strong defensive position on the west bank. However, Curtis ordered Blunt to return to Independence, leaving only a brigade under Colonel Thomas Moonlight on the Little Blue. The next day, Curtis changed his mind and ordered Blunt to take his volunteers back to the river. As he approached the stream, Blunt found that Moonlight's brigade had engaged Price's advance guard at sunup, burning the bridge as they had previously been ordered. Price's main force had arrived and was fiercely engaging Moonlight's men, who stubbornly guarded every ford in the area. Blunt immediately attacked, trying to drive Price back beyond the defensive positions he hoped to recover. A five-hour battle took place, in which the Union troops would force the Confederates to fall back, entrenching themselves behind rock walls, and await an inevitable counterattack. The outnumbered Federals compelled their enemy to fight for every inch of ground, but Confederate numeric superiority eventually forced the Yankees to retreat. The focus of the battle shifted to Independence itself.
Independence (October 21–22)
As Blunt's forces at the Little Blue withdrew westward toward Kansas City, they passed through Independence. Here Union rearguard units attempted to cover their retreat by engaging Price's oncoming troops in the city streets. Brisk fighting raged through the town all afternoon, with the Federals slowly being pushed back. On the night of October 21 Price camped along an unfinished railroad cut just west of Independence, having taken the city itself. However, he was himself being pursued by 10,000 Union cavalry under Maj. Gen. Alfred Pleasonton, who caught up with Price in Independence at dawn the following day. Pleasonton crossed the Little Blue and attacked the city from the northeast, thus hitting Price in his rear as he undertook to continue his westward march. Two of Fagan's brigades were mauled by the attacking Federals, being pushed back through the city toward the west where the main Federal force lay. Another Confederate brigade attempted to stem the onslaught on the grounds of what is now the Community of Christ's Independence Temple, but was practically annihilated by Pleasonton's force. Nevertheless, a decisive victory eluded the Union in Independence. Marmaduke's division engaged Pleasonton about 2 miles (3 km) west of town, managing to push the Federals back and hold them until the morning of the 23rd. The focus of activity now shifted westward from Independence to Westport, in modern Kansas City.
Big Blue (October 22–23)

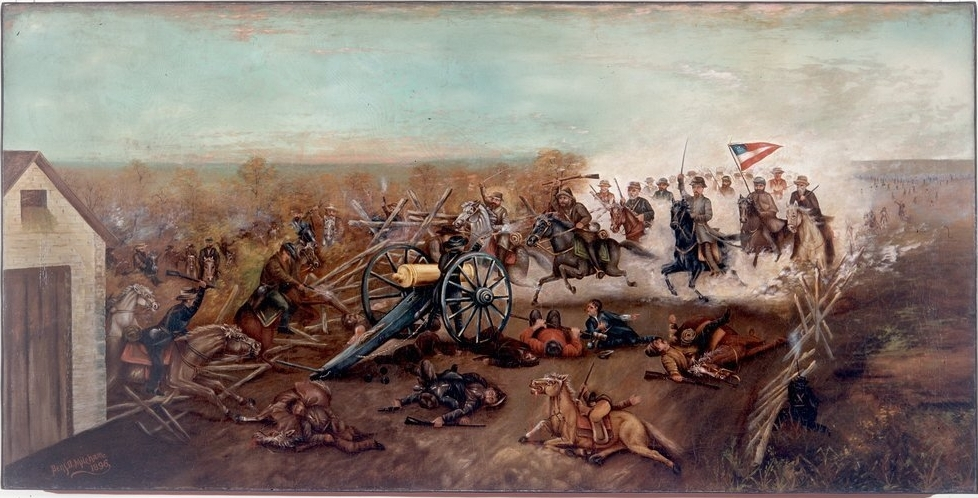
The Battle of the Blue by Benjamin D. Mileham

The Battle of Byram's Ford comprised two separate skirmishes, one fought on the 22nd of October, and the other the next day.

As Price neared Kansas City, he learned that General Curtis's Federal Army of the Border had assembled in and around Westport, blocking his way west. Furthermore, Pleasonton's cavalry division was pressing Price's rear, being heavily engaged with elements of his force in Independence on the 22nd (see above). Price had nearly 500 wagons in his train, and he required a good ford over the Big Blue River to enable the safe passage of his supplies. Byram's Ford was the best in the area, and thus became a strategic point during the fighting that was about to take place around Westport. On October 22, Blunt's Union division held a defensive position on the Big Blue's west bank. Around 10:00 a.m., parts of Shelby's division conducted a diversionary frontal attack on Blunt's men. The rest of Shelby's men flanked Blunt's hasty defenses, forcing the Federals to retire to Westport. Price's wagon train and about 5,000 head of cattle then crossed the Big Blue River at Byram's Ford and headed south toward Little Santa Fe and temporary safety.
The second skirmish at Byram's Ford took place on the 23rd, forming a part of the decisive Battle of Westport, which was raging nearby. Having dislodged Blunt's division the day before, Confederates under Marmaduke now held the west bank of the Big Blue to prevent Pleasonton from attacking Price's rear. The Northern general began his assault on Byram's Ford around 8 a.m., and initially the Confederates held their own. One of the Union brigade commanders, Brigadier General Egbert B. Brown, stalled his attack and was arrested by Pleasonton for disobeying orders. Another brigade commander, Colonel Edward F. Winslow, was wounded and succeeded by Lt. Col. Frederick Benteen, who later rode to fame at the Little Bighorn. Despite these setbacks, Federal troops gained the west bank by 11 a.m. and Marmaduke retired. Price now faced two Federal armies, one to his front and one to his rear, each of which outnumbered his beleaguered force. The outcome of the Battle of Westport was sealed, although the fighting would continue until that evening.
Westport (October 23)
Spurning the idea of any retreat southwards, Price decided that he would deal with Curtis and Pleasonton by attacking them one at a time. Pleasonton was coming hard after the previous day's fighting in Independence, so Price decided to strike Curtis's Army of the Border at Westport first, then turn to deal with Pleasonton in his rear. However Curtis held strong defensive positions and despite numerous charges during the four-hour battle, Price was unable to break the Union line. Once Pleasonton crossed the Big Blue River at Byram's Ford, Price's fate was sealed. His army retreated south through Kansas toward Arkansas, pursued by Pleasonton's cavalry; it would never recover. This battle, known afterwards as "the Gettysburg of the West", effectively ended Price's campaign and all remaining Confederate hopes west of the Mississippi River.
Marais des Cygnes (October 25)
Three battles occurred within several hours of each other on October 25th, the first of which was the battle of Marais des Cygnes.
With Price now in headlong retreat, Pleasonton pursued him into Kansas. He caught up with the Confederates as they camped on the banks of the Marais des Cygnes River near Trading Post in Linn County, Kansas. After an artillery bombardment that began at 4:00 a.m., Pleasonton's men launched a furious assault. Price ordered his troops to cross the swollen river, leaving Fagan to hold off the Federals until he could get his wagon train across. Although the Union captured two cannon and several prisoners, they were unable to prevent the escape of Price's force. Pleasonton continued his pursuit of Price, catching up with him again later that morning at Mine Creek.
Battle of Mine Creek (Little Osage River) (October 25)

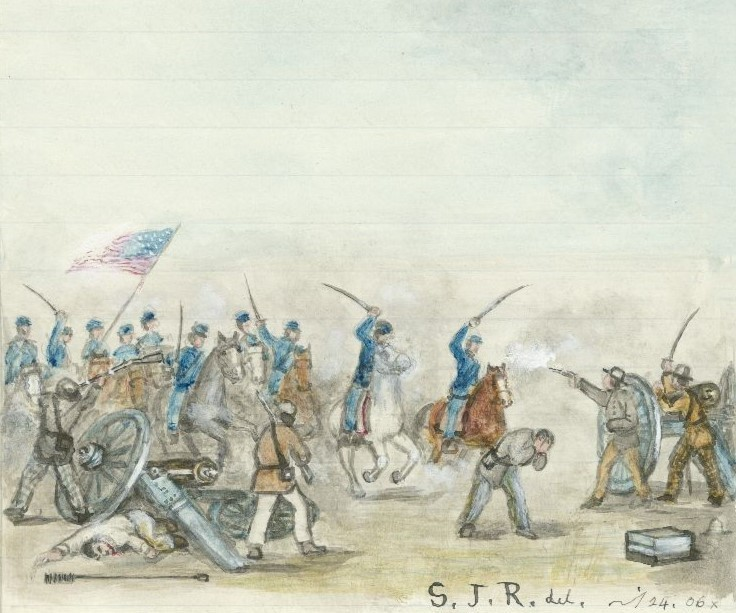
It Went Against Us by Samuel J. Reader

About 6 miles (10 km) south of Trading Post, the brigades of Col. Frederick W. Benteen and Col. John Philips of Pleasonton's division, overtook Price's Confederates as they were crossing Mine Creek. The Southerners had been stalled as their wagons crossed the swollen ford, and they formed their line of battle on the north side of Mine Creek. Although outnumbered, the Federals commenced a mounted attack, led by the 4th Iowa Cavalry, which one participant described as bursting upon the Confederates "like a thunderbolt", causing Price's line to disintegrate "like a row of bricks". Superior Union firepower and the ferocity of their attack made up for their inferior numbers, and Pleasonton's cavalry forced Price to retreat once more. Approximately 600 of Price's men and two of his generals, Marmaduke and Brig. Gen. William L. Cabell, were captured, together with six cannon.
Charlot (October 25)
Price continued his cartage towards Fort Scott, Kansas. In the late afternoon of October 25, his supply train encountered difficulties crossing the Marmiton River ford. Just as at Mine Creek earlier that afternoon, Price had to make another stand. Brig. Gen. John McNeil, commanding two brigades of Pleasonton's cavalry, engaged troops that Price and his officers had rallied from the earlier battles, including a sizable contingent of unarmed men. Observing the large Confederate force and not knowing that many were unarmed, McNeil refrained from an all-out assault. After about two hours of skirmishing Price recommenced his retreat, while McNeil could not mount an effective pursuit. Price's army was now utterly broken; it was simply a question of whether he could escape, and how many men he could successfully evacuate to friendly territory.
Newtonia (October 28)
The tattered remnants of Price's army stopped to rest about 2 miles (3 km) south of Newtonia, Missouri. Soon afterward, Blunt's Union cavalry surprised the Confederates and engaged them. With many of Price's troops in pell-mell retreat, Joseph Shelby's division—including his Iron Brigade—rode to the front, dismounted, and engaged the Federals while the remaining Southerners retreated towards the Indian Territory. Brigadier General John Sanborn later appeared with Union reinforcements, convincing Shelby to retire. Union troops had once again forced the Confederates to retreat, but failed to destroy or capture them. This was the final battle in Price's Missouri campaign.

== Aftermath ==
Hoping to avoid Fort Smith, Arkansas, Price swung west into the Indian Territory and Texas before returning to Arkansas on December 2. He had lost more than half of his original force of 12,000, including thousands of the guerrillas who joined him. He reported to Kirby Smith that he "marched 1,434 miles (2,308 km), fought 43 battles and skirmishes, captured and paroled over 3,000 Federal officers and men, captured 18 pieces of artillery ... and destroyed Missouri property ... of $10,000,000 in value". Nevertheless, Price's Missouri Expedition was a total failure and contributed, together with Union successes in Virginia and Georgia, to the re-election of President Lincoln.

A second unintended consequence of Price's Missouri Expedition was that it had largely cleared Missouri of the pro-Confederate guerrillas who belonged to no one's army, since almost all of those who had joined him were either killed or followed him out of the state. Price's Missouri Expedition proved to be the final Confederate offensive in the Trans-Mississippi region during the war.

=== Retrospective assessment ===
In his 2004 paper "Assessing Compound Warfare During Price's Raid", written as a thesis for the U.S. Army Command and General Staff College, Major Dale E. Davis postulates that Price's Missouri Expedition failed primarily due to his inability to properly employ the principles of "compound warfare." This requires an inferior power to effectively use regular and irregular forces in concert (as was done by the North Vietnamese and Viet Cong against the French and Americans during the Vietnam War) to defeat a superior army. He also blames Price's slow rate of movement during his campaign, and the close proximity of Confederate irregulars to his regular force, for this outcome.

Major Davis observes that by wasting valuable time, ammunition and men in fairly meaningless assaults on Fort Davidson, Glasgow, Sedalia and Boonville, Price gave Union General Rosecrans time to organize an effective response he might not otherwise have had. Furthermore, he says, Price's insistence on guarding an ever-growing wagon train of looted military supplies and other items ultimately became "an albatross to [his] withdrawal." Price, wrote Davis, ought to have used Confederate bushwhackers to harass Federal formations, forcing his Union foe to send large numbers of troops out to pursue them over wide ranges of territory. This would have reduced the number of effectives available to fight against Price's main force. Instead, Price kept many guerrillas close to his army and even incorporated some into his ranks, which sharply reduced the value of their mobility and small, independent formations. This allowed the Federal generals to concentrate a force large enough to trap and defeat Price at Westport, which ended his campaign, forced him to retreat, and crushed one of the Confederacy's last hopes in the Civil War.

== See also ==
- Attacks on the United States
