= 14th Kansas Cavalry Regiment =

- Active: April 1863 – June 25, 1865
- Country: United States
- Allegiance: Union
- Branch: Cavalry
- Equipment: Spencer carbines
- Engagements: Lawrence Massacre; Battle of Middle Boggy Depot; Battle of Prairie D'Ane; Battle of Poison Spring (detachment); Battle of Jenkins' Ferry; Battle of Byram's Ford; Battle of Westport; Battle of Mine Creek; Battle of Marmiton River; Second Battle of Newtonia

The 14th Kansas Cavalry Regiment was a cavalry regiment that served in the Union Army during the American Civil War.

== Service ==
The 14th Kansas Cavalry was organized at Fort Scott and Leavenworth, Kansas in April 1863 as a battalion serving as escort for Maj. Gen. James G. Blunt. It was later organized as a regiment at Fort Scott in December 1863 and mustered in for three years under the command of Lieutenant Colonel Thomas Moonlight.

The regiment was attached to District of the Frontier, Department of Missouri, April 1863 to January 1864. Unattached, District of the Frontier, VII Corps, Department of Arkansas, to March 1864. 3rd Brigade, Frontier Division, VII Corps, to January 1865. 2nd Brigade, 3rd Division, VII Corps, to February 1865. Unattached, VII Corps, Pine Bluff, Arkansas, to June 1863.

The 14th Kansas Cavalry mustered out of service at Fort Gibson, Indian Territory on June 25, 1865.

== Detailed service ==
Cabin Creek, Cherokee Nation, July 1–2, 1863 (Company B). Operations against Quantrill in Kansas August 20–28. Massacre at Lawrence August 21 (detachment). Operations in Cherokee Nation September 11–25. Waldron September 11. Baxter Springs October 6 (Company B). Regiment moved to Fort Smith, Arkansas, November 20-December 3. Duty there scouting and foraging until February 23, 1864. Expedition into Choctaw County February 1–21. Moved to Ozark February 26–28, and duty there until April 6. Flint Creek March 6. Steele's Expedition against Camden April 6-May 3. Prairie D'Ann April 9–12. Poison Springs April 18 (detachment). Jenkins' Ferry, Saline River, April 30 (Companies F and G). Return to Fort Smith May and duty there until January 1865. Hahn's Farm near Waldron June 19, 1864. Ozark July 14–15. Scout on Republican River August 19–24. Camp Verdegris September 2. Cabin Creek September 19. Vache Grass September 26. (Company E with Blunt's headquarters during Price's Raid in Missouri and Kansas October–November. Big Blue and State Line October 22. Westport October 23. Mine Creek, Little Osage River, and Battle of Charlot October 25. Newtonia October 28.) Moved to Clarksville January 1, 1865, then to Pine Bluff February 25–27, and duty there until May. Moved to Fort Gibson and duty there until June.

== Casualties ==
The regiment lost a total of 169 men during service; 2 officers and 51 enlisted men killed or mortally wounded, 2 officers and 114 enlisted men died of disease.

== Commanders ==
- Colonel Charles W. Blair
- Lieutenant Colonel Thomas Moonlight
- Lieutenant Colonel J. Finn Hill
- Lieutenant Colonel Albert J. Briggs
- Major J. G. Brown
- Major Charles Willette
- captain William Larimer Jr

== See also ==
- List of Kansas Civil War Units
- Kansas in the Civil War
