= Preston B. Plumb =

American politician (1837–1891)

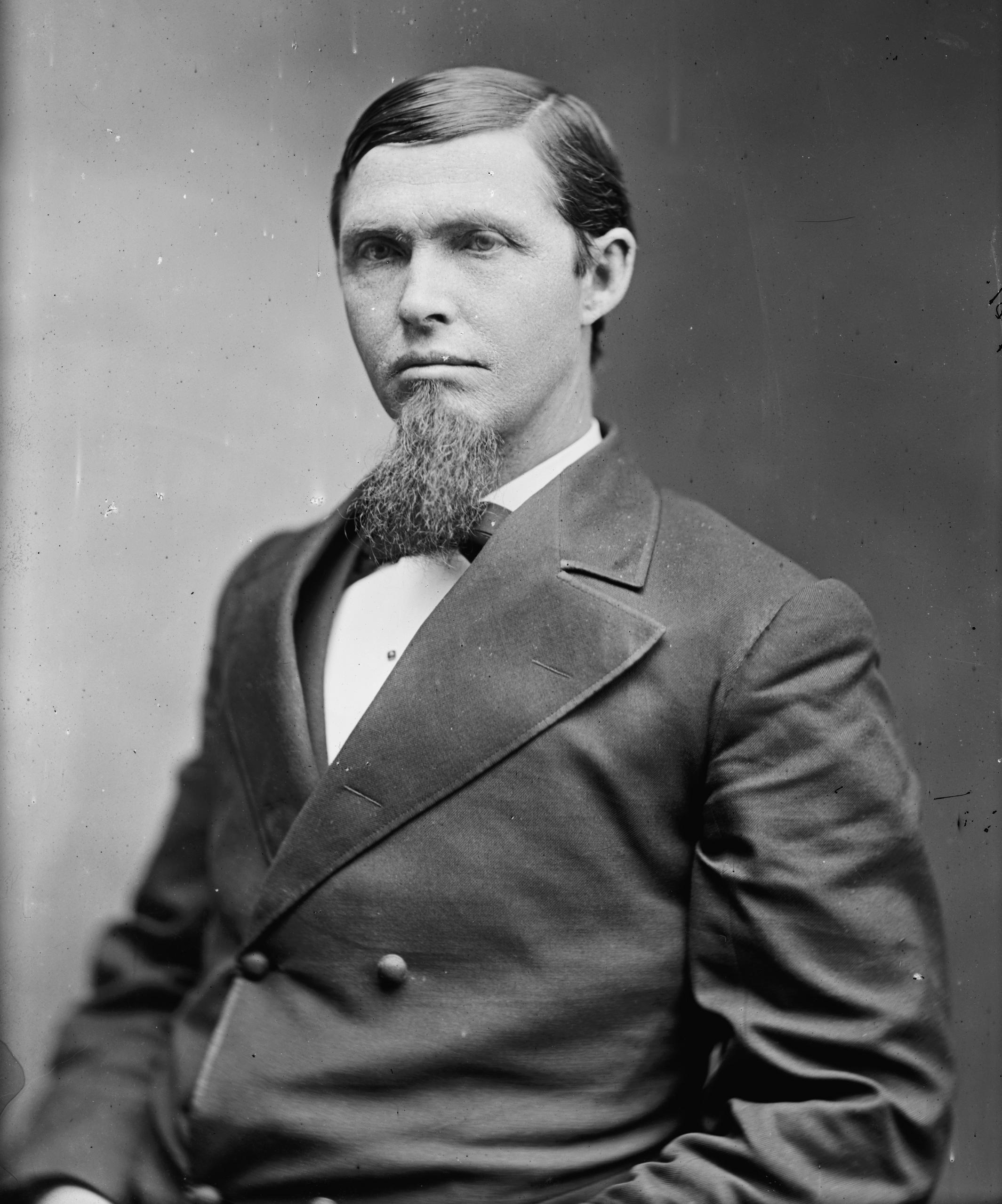
- Plumb, 1865–1880

United States Senator from Kansas
- In office March 4, 1877 – December 20, 1891
- Preceded by: James M. Harvey
- Succeeded by: Bishop W. Perkins

Member of the Kansas House of Representatives
- In office 1862

Personal details
- Born: Preston Bierce Plumb; October 12, 1837 Delaware County, Ohio, US
- Died: December 20, 1891 (aged 54) Washington, D.C., US
- Party: Republican
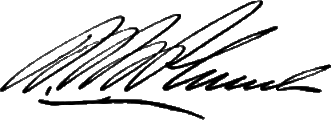
- Signature

Preston Bierce Plumb (October 12, 1837 – December 20, 1891) was a United States senator from Kansas, as well as an officer in the Union Army during the American Civil War.

== Biography ==
Born in Delaware County, Ohio, at 9 his family removed to Marysville, Ohio, where he flourished in the local schools. At 11 he attended Kenyon College, a preparatory school and learned the trade of printing. After 3 years there, he returned to Marysville where he worked for the local paper, The Tribune, and afterwards purchased and edited the Xenia News.

He moved to Lawrence, Kansas in 1856, to support the "Free-State" movement. He was one of the founders of Emporia, Kansas, where he established the Kansas News in 1857. He was secretary of the Free-State convention in 1857 and a member of the Leavenworth constitutional convention in 1859. Plumb studied law and was admitted to the bar in 1861. He was elected to the Kansas House of Representatives in 1862 and was a reporter for the Kansas Supreme Court.

During the Civil War, Plumb entered the Union Army in 1862 as a second lieutenant in the 11th Kansas Infantry, which was redesignated as the 11th Kansas Cavalry in August 1863 in Kansas City. He served successively as captain, major, and lieutenant colonel of the regiment. He was on duty on the eastern border of Kansas until October 1864, helping fight pro-Confederacy Missouri partisans and raiders under William Quantrill, as well as serving in modern-day Wyoming against Indians. Starting in October, Plumb and his regiment fought against the Confederates in several battles during Price's Raid. He was mustered out September 26, 1865. After the war, he was elected as a companion of the Kansas Commandery of the Military Order of the Loyal Legion of the United States.

He was a member of the State House of Representatives in 1867 and 1868, and also served as speaker in the latter year. He was prosecuting attorney of Lyon County and was president of the Emporia National Bank in 1873.

In 1877, Preston Plumb was elected as a Republican to the U.S. Senate; he was reelected in 1883 and 1888 and served from March 4, 1877, until his death. While in the Senate, he was chairman of the Committee on Public Lands (Forty-seventh through Fifty-second Congresses). He died in Washington, D.C., in 1891, and was buried in Maplewood Cemetery in Emporia.

== In popular culture ==
The lead character in the popular 1890 play The Senator was modeled after Plumb.

== See also ==
- List of members of the United States Congress who died in office (1790–1899)

== Notes ==
U.S. Senate
Preceded by James M. Harvey	U.S. senator (Class 2) from Kansas; 1877–1891; Served alongside: John J. Ingalls, William A. Peffer	Succeeded by Bishop W. Perkins
