= Thomas Moonlight =

American politician (1833–1899)

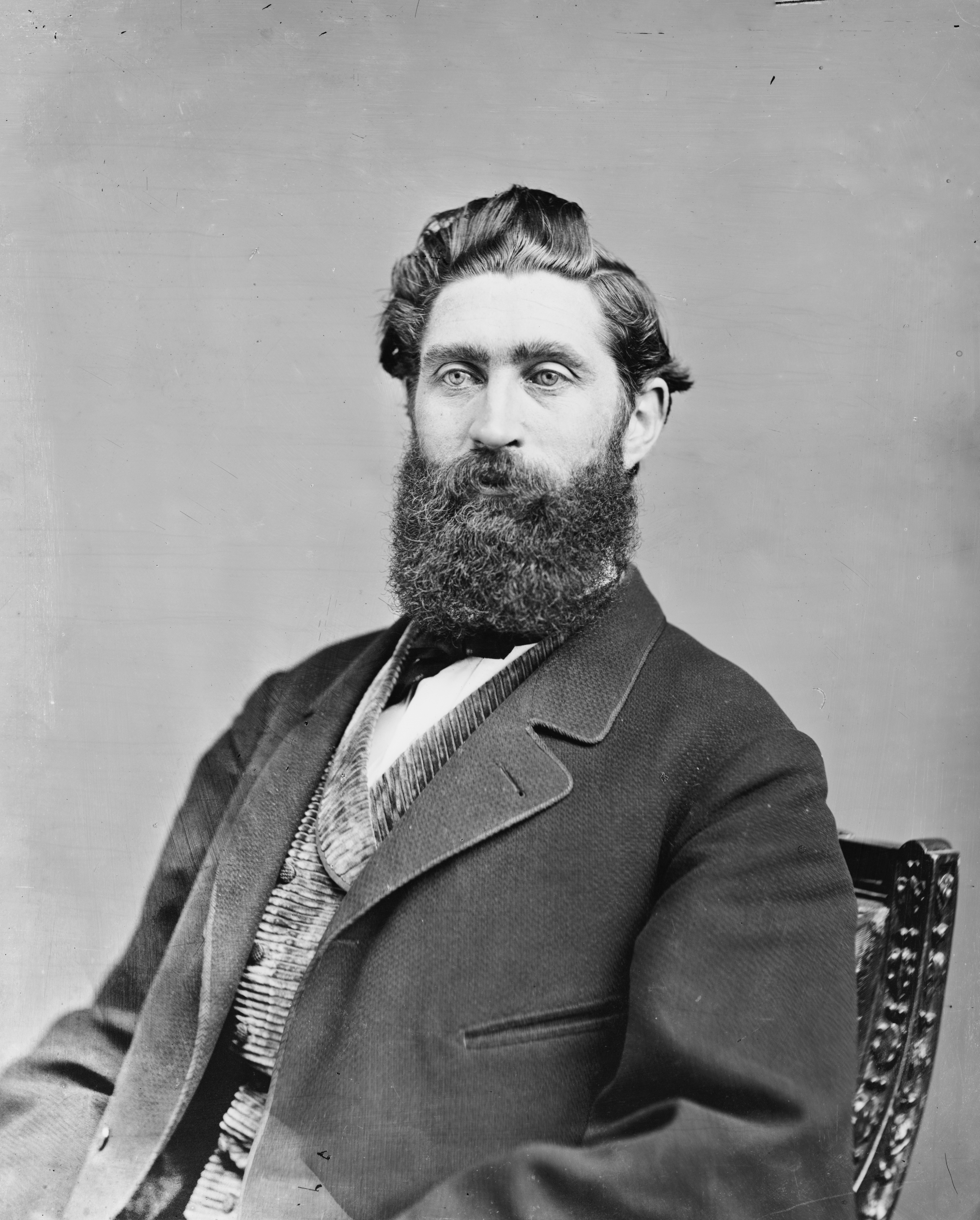
- Born: September 30, 1833; Forfarshire, Scotland
- Died: February 7, 1899 (aged 65); Leavenworth, Kansas, U.S.
- Burial place: Mount Muncie Cemetery, Leavenworth, Kansas
- Military career
- Allegiance: United States; Union
- Branch: United States Army; Union Army
- Service years: 1853–1858, 1861–1865
- Rank: Colonel; Bvt. Brigadier General
- Unit: 4th U.S. Artillery Regiment
- Commands: 1st Kansas Battery; 11th Kansas Infantry Regiment; 11th Kansas Cavalry Regiment; 2nd Bde, Prov. Cav. Div., Army of the Border
- Conflicts: American Civil War; Battle of Old Fort Wayne; Battle of Prairie Grove; Battle of Little Blue River; Battle of Westport; Indian Wars
- Other work: politician

Thomas Moonlight (September 30, 1833 – February 7, 1899) was an American politician and soldier. Moonlight served as Governor of Wyoming Territory from 1887 to 1889.

== Birth ==
Moonlight was born in Forfarshire, Scotland. He was baptized on 30 September 1833 in St Vigeans, Angus, Scotland with birth record number 319/0040 0169. His family can be traced in Scotland back to the 1600s, and to Archibald Moonlight and his wife Margaret Elspet Andersone. Moonlight was one of 10 children.

Moonlight's birth date is frequently quoted as 10 November 1833 (including on his grave marker), but his baptism records exist for 30 September 1833. Early Scottish and English record keeping relied on the church where more commonly the baptism date and not birth date was recorded. It was not until government record keeping began that formal birth dates were recorded.

== Early life ==
When he was seven, records show he lived in Gallowden on a farm with about ninety acres. Moonlight lived with his family and a maid. By 1851, Moonlight no longer lived with his family, which supports evidence he left Scotland at an early age. Some think that he left Scotland alone, but family stories say he possibly left with his two cousins, George and Thomas.

Moonlight is thought to have worked farms in the East until he enlisted in the army at the age of twenty.

Just as Thomas achieved fame in the US, his cousin George eventually left America and achieved fame as a Pioneer and Prospector in New Zealand where the township of Moonlight is named after him. George was said to have retained his American accent all his life and took the name Captain George Fairweather Moonlight. As he had no right to the title Captain, speculation is he adopted Thomas's military achievements in the US. Several places in New Zealand were named by George (Shenandoah River, Rappahannock, Minnehaha) taking America to New Zealand. Both of his cousins are buried in Nelson, New Zealand.

== Life in the United States ==
=== Civil War ===
In 1853, at the age of twenty, Moonlight enlisted in the 4th U.S. Artillery Regiment (Company D). He served in Texas from 1853 to 1856, and was promoted to the rank of orderly sergeant. Moonlight settled in Leavenworth County, Kansas in 1860.

When the American Civil War began in 1861, Moonlight raised a company of artillery for the 4th Kansas Infantry, but the regiment never completed organization. The recruits to the company (and another regiment) were reassigned to the 1st Kansas Battery; Moonlight briefly served as its captain. Moonlight later joined the 11th Kansas Infantry as its lieutenant colonel. The regiment became the 11th Kansas Cavalry and Moonlight its colonel. Moonlight briefly commanded the 14th Kansas Cavalry as lieutenant colonel but was later ordered to return to the 11th Kansas Cavalry.

His service during the war was primarily in Kansas against bushwhackers and border guerrillas. He also pursued William C. Quantrill's raiders following the Lawrence Massacre. In 1864, he commanded the 3rd Sub-district in the District of South Kansas. During Sterling Price's Missouri Raid in 1864, Colonel Moonlight commanded the 2nd Brigade, 1st Division in the Army of the Border and was conspicuous at the Battle of Westport.

=== Indian wars ===
Toward the end of the war, Moonlight was in command of the District of Colorado and campaigned against Indians on the plains. On February 13, 1865, President Abraham Lincoln nominated Moonlight for appointment to the grade of brevet brigadier general of volunteers, to rank from February 13, 1865, and the United States Senate confirmed the appointment on February 23, 1865.

In April 1865, Moonlight became the commander of the north sub-district of the Great Plains headquartered at Fort Laramie, Wyoming. On May 26, Moonlight hanged two Oglala Lakota Sioux chiefs, Two Face and Black Foot. A white woman, Lucinda Ewbanks, and her small child were discovered living in pitiful condition among the Oglala bands. They had been kidnapped by Cheyenne almost a year earlier and sold to the Oglala band of Two Face and Black Foot. Moonlight ordered the two Oglala hanged, apparently over the opposition of Mrs. Ewbanks and although warned by civilians at the fort of repercussions. George Bent and others tell the story differently. He said the two Oglala ransomed the woman from the Cheyenne and brought her into the fort as a peace gesture. Moonlight, however, arrested and hanged them, an action which Mrs. Ewbanks protested. Their bodies, and also that of a Cheyenne, were left hanging from the gallows for months in public view.

On June 3, the army fearing that the 1,500 Lakota, mostly Brulé, and Arapaho living near Fort Laramie, might become hostile, decided to move them about 300 miles east to Fort Kearny in Nebraska. The Indian protested that Fort Kearny was in Pawnee territory and the Pawnee were their traditional enemies. Moreover, they feared, with reason, there would be no food for them at Fort Kearny. The army insisted and the Indians, with an escort of 138 cavalrymen under Captain William D. Fouts, departed Fort Laramie on June 11. However, on June 13, near present-day Morrill, Nebraska, some of the Indians decided to flee northward across the North Platte River. Attempting to stop them, Fouts and four soldiers were killed.

Hearing of the disaster, Moonlight departed Fort Laramie with 234 cavalry to pursue the Indians. He traveled so fast that many of his men had to turn back because their horses were spent. On June 17, near present-day Harrison, Nebraska, the Lakota raided his horse herd and relieved him of most of his remaining horses. Moonlight and many of his men had to walk 60 miles back to Fort Laramie. Moonlight was severely criticized by his soldiers for being drunk and not guarding the horse herd. On July 7, Moonlight was relieved of his command and mustered out of the army.

=== Political career ===
Moonlight returned to his farm and became involved in Kansas politics. He was a Republican until 1870, when he switched to Democrat. He served as the Kansas Secretary of State, and also as State Senator. In 1864 Moonlight was a presidential elector, casting a ballot for the re-election of the incumbent President Abraham Lincoln. From January 8, 1883, to January 22, 1885, he served as the Adjutant General of Kansas.

Moonlight was appointed governor of the Wyoming Territory by President Grover Cleveland on January 5, 1887. Moonlight served as governor until April 9, 1889. After his term as governor, he served as United States Minister to Bolivia from 1893 to 1897. He was unsuccessful in his run for governor of Kansas in 1886.

== Family life ==
Moonlight married Ellen Elizabeth Murray (born in Ireland) and they had seven children.

== Death ==
Moonlight died on February 7, 1899, and is buried in Mount Muncie Cemetery in Lansing, Kansas. Moonlight's wife is buried in the same cemetery.

== See also ==
- List of American Civil War brevet generals (Union)

== Notes ==
Party political offices
Preceded by George Washington Glick	Democratic nominee for Governor of Kansas; 1886	Succeeded by John Martin
Political offices
Preceded by Rinaldo Allen Barker	Secretary of State of Kansas; 1869–1871	Succeeded by William Hillary Smallwood
Preceded by Elliot S. N. Morgan	Governor of Wyoming Territory; 1887–1889	Succeeded by Francis E. Warren
Diplomatic posts
Preceded by Frederic J. Grant	United States Envoy to Bolivia; April 1894 – January 8, 1898	Succeeded by George H. Bridgman
