= 1884 United States presidential election in Nebraska =

- November 4, 1884
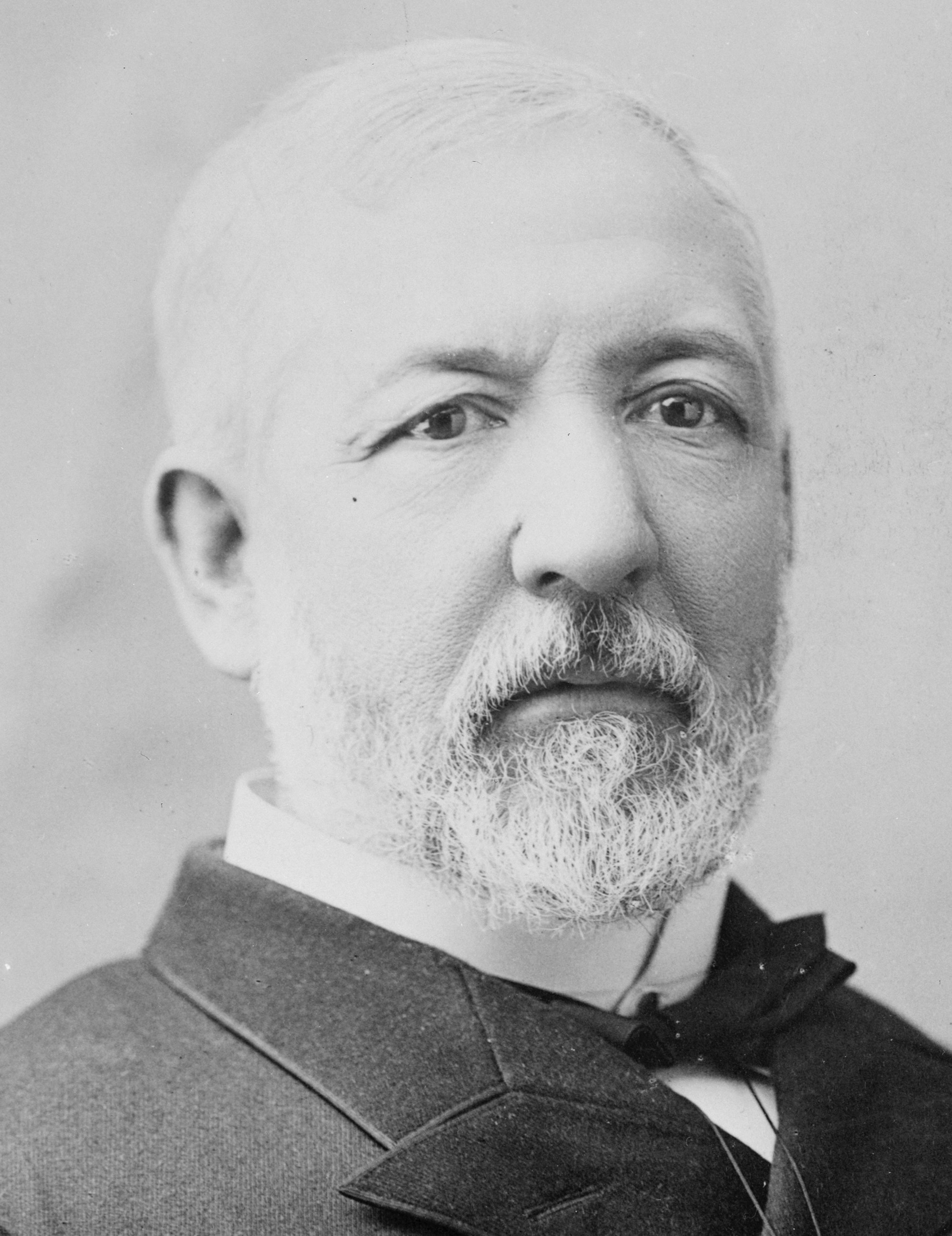

Nominee	James G. Blaine	Grover Cleveland
Party	Republican	Democratic
Home state	Maine	New York
Running mate	John A. Logan	Thomas A. Hendricks
Electoral vote	5	0
Popular vote	76,912	54,391
Percentage	57.31%	40.53%
County results
Blaine
40–50%
50–60%
60–70%
70–80%
80–90%
Cleveland
40–50%
50–60%
President before election
Chester A. Arthur
Republican
Elected President
Grover Cleveland
Democratic

The 1884 United States presidential election in Nebraska took place on November 4, 1884, as part of the 1884 United States presidential election. Voters chose five representatives, or electors to the Electoral College, who voted for president and vice president.

Nebraska voted for the Republican nominee, James G. Blaine, over the Democratic nominee, Grover Cleveland. Blaine won the state by a margin of 16.78%.

With 57.31% of the popular vote, Nebraska would prove to be Blaine's fifth strongest victory in terms of percentage in the popular vote after Vermont, Minnesota, Kansas and Rhode Island.

== Results ==
1884 United States presidential election in Nebraska
Party	Candidate	Running mate	Popular vote		Electoral vote	
Party	Candidate	Running mate	Count	%	Count	%
Republican	James Gillespie Blaine of Maine	John Alexander Logan of Illinois	76,912	57.31%	5	100.00%
Democratic	Grover Cleveland of New York	Thomas Andrews Hendricks of Indiana	54,391	40.53%	0	0.00%
Prohibition	John Pierce St. John of Kansas	William Daniel of Maryland	2,899	2.16%	0	0.00%
Total			134,202	100.00%	5	100.00%

=== Results by county ===
County	James Gillespie Blaine Republican		Stephen Grover Cleveland Democratic		John Pierce St. John Prohibition		Margin		Total votes cast
County	#	%	#	%	#	%	#	%	Total votes cast
Adams	1,854	60.25%	1,109	36.04%	114	3.70%	745	24.21%	3,077
Antelope	1,115	69.51%	457	28.49%	32	2.00%	658	41.02%	1,604
Boone	1,065	64.98%	527	32.15%	47	2.87%	538	32.82%	1,639
Brown	1,110	65.72%	551	32.62%	28	1.66%	559	33.10%	1,689
Buffalo	1,612	57.86%	1,147	41.17%	27	0.97%	465	16.69%	2,786
Burt	1,461	72.61%	540	26.84%	11	0.55%	921	45.78%	2,012
Butler	1,136	44.74%	1,210	47.66%	193	7.60%	-74	-2.91%	2,539
Cass	2,256	54.86%	1,826	44.41%	30	0.73%	430	10.46%	4,112
Cedar	330	39.90%	490	59.25%	7	0.85%	-160	-19.35%	827
Cherry	260	52.21%	237	47.59%	1	0.20%	23	4.62%	498
Cheyenne	400	52.29%	365	47.71%	0	0.00%	35	4.58%	765
Clay	1,684	64.92%	806	31.07%	104	4.01%	878	33.85%	2,594
Colfax	789	49.44%	805	50.44%	2	0.13%	-16	-1.00%	1,596
Cuming	871	48.28%	921	51.05%	12	0.67%	-50	-2.77%	1,804
Custer	1,246	64.53%	664	34.39%	21	1.09%	582	30.14%	1,931
Dakota	476	50.69%	458	48.78%	5	0.53%	18	1.92%	939
Dawson	686	63.23%	384	35.39%	15	1.38%	302	27.83%	1,085
Dixon	777	61.67%	414	32.86%	69	5.48%	363	28.81%	1,260
Dodge	1,634	47.97%	1,690	49.62%	82	2.41%	-56	-1.64%	3,406
Douglas	4,894	51.61%	4,516	47.62%	73	0.77%	378	3.99%	9,483
Dundy	53	50.96%	51	49.04%	0	0.00%	2	1.92%	104
Fillmore	1,620	60.56%	997	37.27%	58	2.17%	623	23.29%	2,675
Franklin	733	60.33%	435	35.80%	47	3.87%	298	24.53%	1,215
Frontier	316	68.85%	143	31.15%	0	0.00%	173	37.69%	459
Furnas	828	67.37%	376	30.59%	25	2.03%	452	36.78%	1,229
Gage	3,007	58.64%	1,934	37.71%	187	3.65%	1,073	20.92%	5,128
Garfield	152	58.46%	108	41.54%	0	0.00%	44	16.92%	260
Gosper	323	60.04%	213	39.59%	2	0.37%	110	20.45%	538
Greeley	335	48.55%	355	51.45%	0	0.00%	-20	-2.90%	690
Hall	1,467	54.45%	1,215	45.10%	12	0.45%	252	9.35%	2,694
Hamilton	1,360	59.47%	904	39.53%	23	1.01%	456	19.94%	2,287
Harlan	760	66.84%	321	28.23%	56	4.93%	439	38.61%	1,137
Hitchcock	160	64.52%	88	35.48%	0	0.00%	72	29.03%	248
Holt	1,638	56.37%	1,166	40.12%	102	3.51%	472	16.24%	2,906
Howard	728	50.14%	723	49.79%	1	0.07%	5	0.34%	1,452
Jefferson	1,343	62.55%	789	36.75%	15	0.70%	554	25.80%	2,147
Johnson	1,361	57.16%	991	41.62%	29	1.22%	370	15.54%	2,381
Kearney	941	61.18%	582	37.84%	15	0.98%	359	23.34%	1,538
Keith	67	47.86%	72	51.43%	1	0.71%	-5	-3.57%	140
Knox	894	63.90%	485	34.67%	20	1.43%	409	29.24%	1,399
Lancaster	4,011	62.69%	2,180	34.07%	207	3.24%	1,831	28.62%	6,398
Lincoln	505	57.45%	362	41.18%	12	1.37%	143	16.27%	879
Loup	166	80.58%	40	19.42%	0	0.00%	126	61.17%	206
Madison	969	53.89%	811	45.11%	18	1.00%	158	8.79%	1,798
Merrick	925	59.18%	538	34.42%	100	6.40%	387	24.76%	1,563
Nance	485	66.26%	235	32.10%	12	1.64%	250	34.15%	732
Nemaha	1,690	57.74%	1,207	41.24%	30	1.02%	483	16.50%	2,927
Nuckolls	960	62.34%	562	36.49%	18	1.17%	398	25.84%	1,540
Otoe	2,013	49.47%	1,930	47.43%	126	3.10%	83	2.04%	4,069
Pawnee	1,283	62.19%	683	33.11%	97	4.70%	600	29.08%	2,063
Phelps	833	78.36%	216	20.32%	14	1.32%	617	58.04%	1,063
Pierce	325	52.42%	278	44.84%	17	2.74%	47	7.58%	620
Platte	1,117	45.97%	1,285	52.88%	28	1.15%	-168	-6.91%	2,430
Polk	944	52.15%	783	43.26%	83	4.59%	161	8.90%	1,810
Red Willow	606	67.56%	279	31.10%	12	1.34%	327	36.45%	897
Richardson	2,062	49.77%	2,007	48.44%	74	1.79%	55	1.33%	4,143
Saline	2,167	56.05%	1,608	41.59%	91	2.35%	559	14.46%	3,866
Sarpy	616	49.32%	610	48.84%	23	1.84%	6	0.48%	1,249
Saunders	1,819	49.71%	1,667	45.56%	173	4.73%	152	4.15%	3,659
Seward	1,630	53.81%	1,332	43.97%	67	2.21%	298	9.84%	3,029
Sherman	503	58.02%	350	40.37%	14	1.61%	153	17.65%	867
Stanton	318	47.68%	349	52.32%	0	0.00%	-31	-4.65%	667
Thayer	1,220	58.29%	859	41.04%	14	0.67%	361	17.25%	2,093
Valley	749	64.24%	403	34.56%	14	1.20%	346	29.67%	1,166
Washington	1,419	59.32%	924	38.63%	49	2.05%	495	20.69%	2,392
Wayne	420	65.83%	211	33.07%	7	1.10%	209	32.76%	638
Webster	1,300	65.49%	655	33.00%	30	1.51%	645	32.49%	1,985
Wheeler	145	70.05%	59	28.50%	3	1.45%	86	41.55%	207
York	1,970	66.26%	903	30.37%	100	3.36%	1,067	35.89%	2,973
Totals	76,912	57.31%	54,391	40.53%	2,899	2.16%	22,521	16.78%	134,202

== See also ==
- United States presidential elections in Nebraska
