= 1884 United States presidential election in Rhode Island =

- November 4, 1884
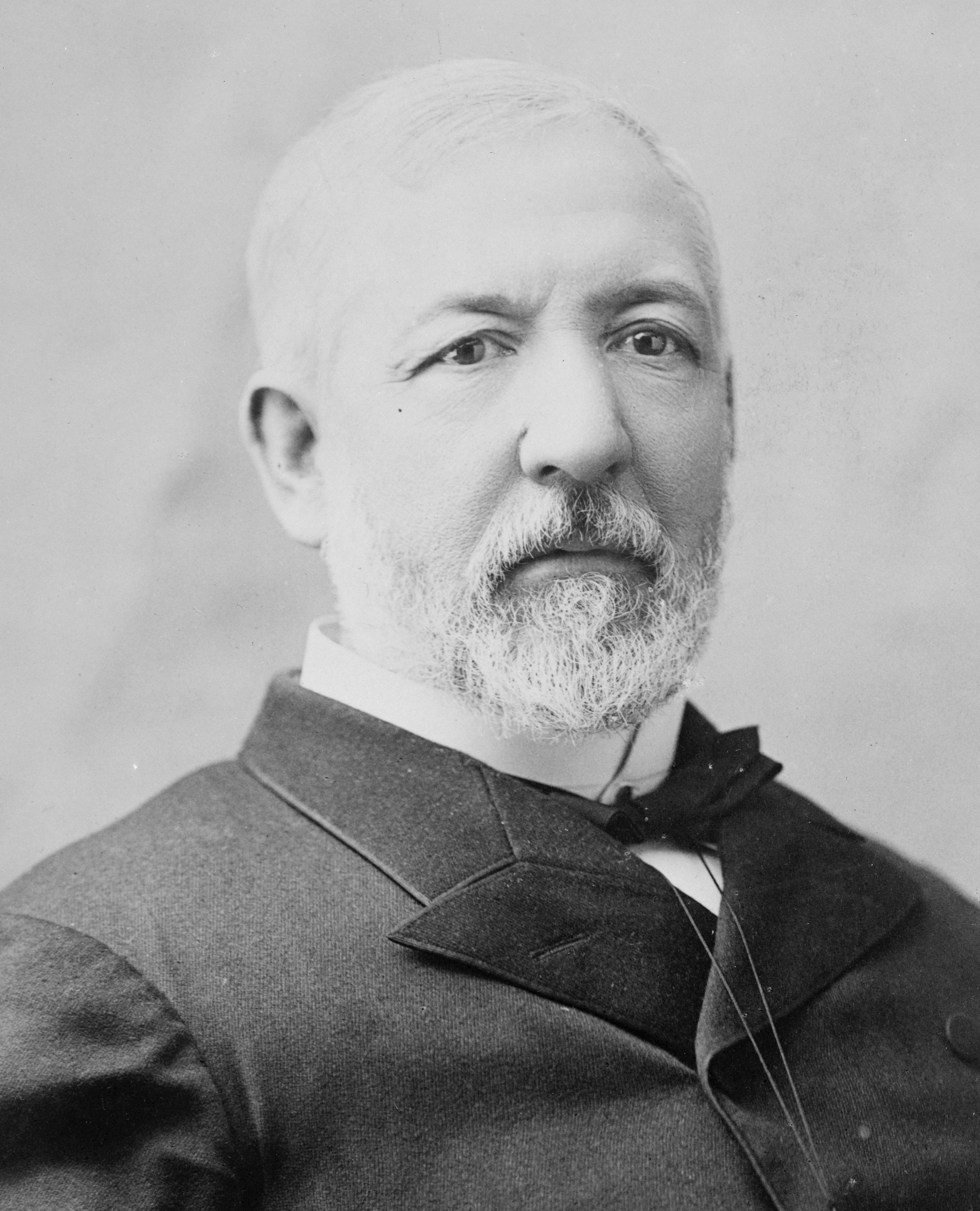

Nominee	James G. Blaine	Grover Cleveland
Party	Republican	Democratic
Home state	Maine	New York
Running mate	John A. Logan	Thomas A. Hendricks
Electoral vote	4	0
Popular vote	19,030	12,391
Percentage	58.07%	37.81%

Blaine
50–60%
60–70%
70–80%
80–90%
90–100%
Cleveland
50–60%
President before election
Chester A. Arthur
Republican
Elected President
Grover Cleveland
Democratic

The 1884 United States presidential election in Rhode Island occurred on November 4, 1884. This election was part of the 1884 United States presidential election. Voters in Rhode Island selected four representatives, or electors, to the Electoral College, which elects the president and vice president.

Rhode Island voted for the Republican nominee, James G. Blaine, over the Democratic nominee, Grover Cleveland. Blaine won the state by a margin of 20.26%.

With 58.07% of the popular vote, Rhode Island became Blaine's fourth strongest victory in terms of percentage, following Vermont, Minnesota and Kansas.

== Results ==
1884 United States presidential election in Rhode Island
Party	Candidate	Running mate	Popular vote		Electoral vote	
Party	Candidate	Running mate	Count	%	Count	%
Republican	James Gillespie Blaine of Maine	John Alexander Logan of Illinois	19,030	58.07%	4	100.00%
Democratic	Grover Cleveland of New York	Thomas Andrews Hendricks of Indiana	12,391	37.81%	0	0.00%
Prohibition	John Pierce St. John of Kansas	William Daniel of Maryland	928	2.83%	0	0.00%
Greenback	Benjamin Franklin Butler of Massachusetts	Absolom Madden West of Mississippi	423	1.29%	0	0.00%
Total			32,771	100.00%	4	100.00%

== See also ==
- United States presidential elections in Rhode Island
