= 1884 United States presidential election in Louisiana =

- November 4, 1884

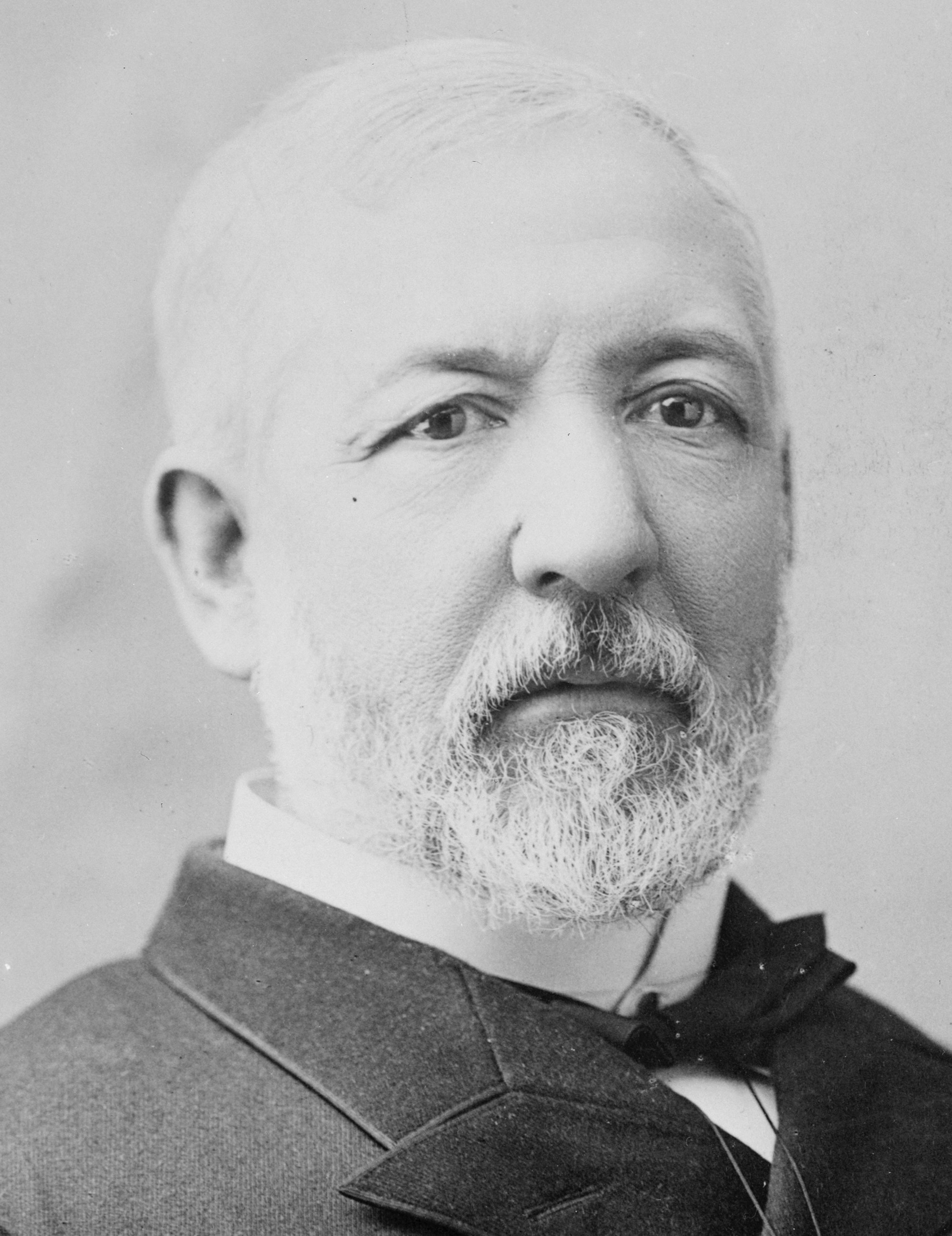
Nominee	Grover Cleveland	James G. Blaine
Party	Democratic	Republican
Home state	New York	Maine
Running mate	Thomas A. Hendricks	John A. Logan
Electoral vote	8	0
Popular vote	62,594	46,347
Percentage	57.22%	42.37%
Parish results
Cleveland
50–60%
60–70%
70–80%
80–90%
90–100%
Blaine
50–60%
60–70%
70–80%
80–90%
90–100%
President before election
Chester A. Arthur
Republican
Elected President
Grover Cleveland
Democratic

The 1884 United States presidential election in Louisiana took place on November 4, 1884. All contemporary 38 states were part of the 1884 United States presidential election. State voters chose eight electors to the Electoral College, which selected the president and vice president.

Louisiana voted for the Democratic nominee, Grover Cleveland, over the Republican nominee, James G. Blaine by a margin of 14.85%.

== Results ==
1884 United States presidential election in Louisiana
Party	Candidate	Running mate	Popular vote		Electoral vote	
Party	Candidate	Running mate	Count	%	Count	%
Democratic	Grover Cleveland of New York	Thomas Andrews Hendricks of Indiana	62,594	57.22%	8	100.00%
Republican	James Gillespie Blaine of Maine	John Alexander Logan of Illinois	46,347	42.37%	0	0.00%
Prohibition	John Pierce St. John of Kansas	William Daniel of Maryland	338	0.31%	0	0.00%
Greenback	Benjamin Franklin Butler of Massachusetts	Absolom Madden West of Mississippi	120	0.11%	0	0.00%
Total			109,399	100.00%	8	100.00%

== See also ==
- United States presidential elections in Louisiana
