= 1884 United States presidential election in West Virginia =

- November 4, 1884
- Turnout: 21.37% of the total population ▲3.16 pp

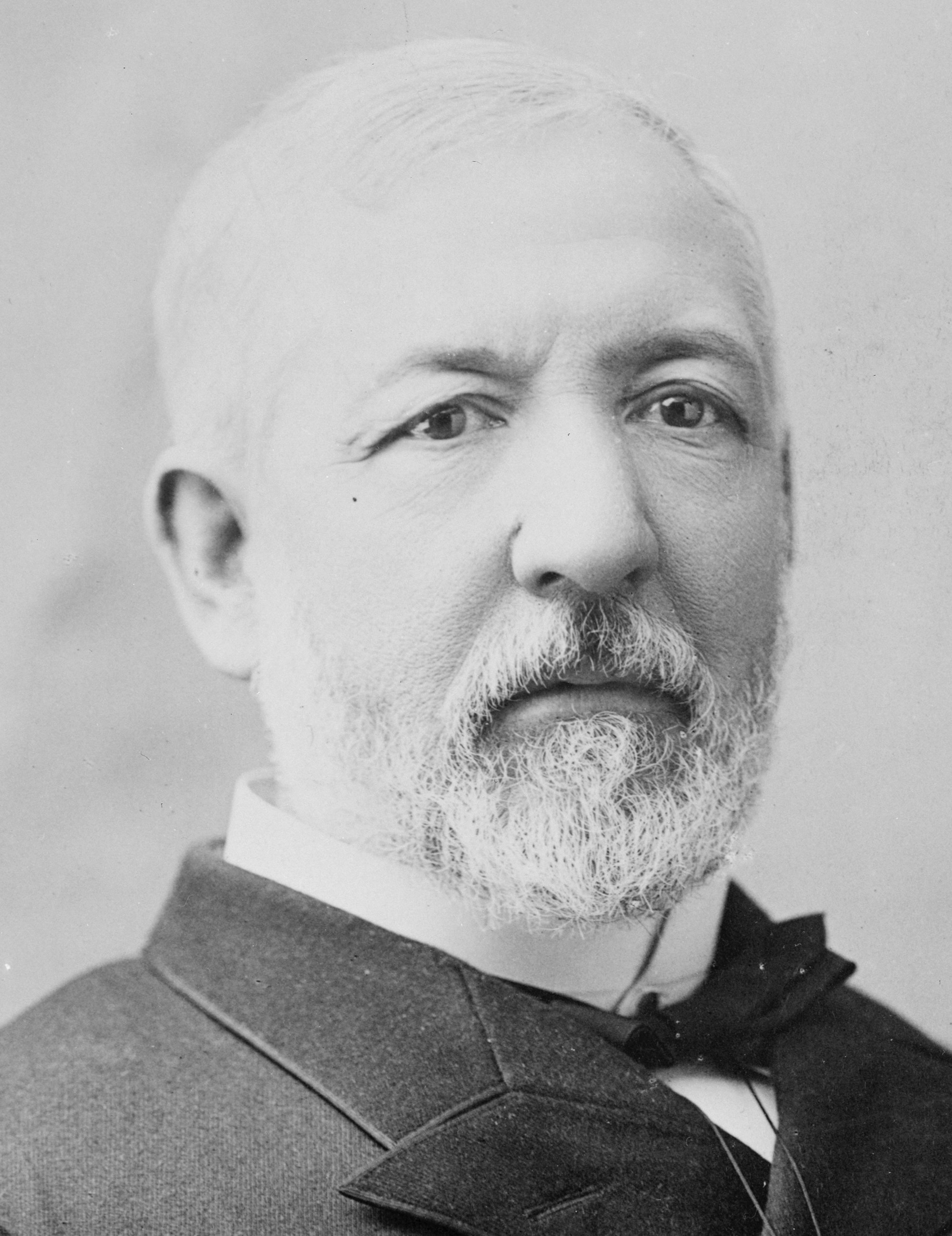
Nominee	Grover Cleveland	James G. Blaine
Party	Democratic	Republican
Home state	New York	Maine
Running mate	Thomas A. Hendricks	John A. Logan
Electoral vote	6	0
Popular vote	67,311	63,096
Percentage	50.94%	47.75%
County results
Cleveland
40–50%
50–60%
60–70%
70–80%
80–90%
Blaine
40–50%
50–60%
60–70%
70–80%
President before election
Chester A. Arthur
Republican
Elected President
Grover Cleveland
Democratic

The 1884 United States presidential election in West Virginia took place on November 4, 1884, as part of the 1884 United States presidential election. State voters chose six representatives, or electors, to the Electoral College, who voted for president and vice president.

West Virginia was won by Grover Cleveland, the 28th governor of New York, (D–New York), running with the former governor of Indiana Thomas A. Hendricks, with 50.94 percent of the popular vote, against Secretary of State James G. Blaine (R-Maine), running with Senator John A. Logan, with 47.75 percent of the vote.

The Prohibition Party chose John St. John, the former governor of Kansas, and former Maryland State Senator William Daniel as their presidential and vice-presidential candidates and received 0.71 percent of the vote. The Greenback and Anti-Monopoly Parties both chose major general and former governor of Massachusetts Benjamin Butler and Absolom M. West, an unseated Mississippi representative, received 0.60 percent of the vote.

This would prove the last time the Democratic Party won an absolute majority of West Virginia's popular vote until 1932.

== Results ==
1884 United States presidential election in West Virginia
Party	Candidate	Votes	%
Democratic	Grover Cleveland	67,311	50.94%
Republican	James G. Blaine	63,096	47.75%
Prohibition	John St. John	939	0.71%
Greenback	Benjamin Butler	799	0.60%
Total votes		132,145	100.00%

=== Results by county ===
1884 United States presidential election in West Virginia by county
County	Grover Cleveland Democratic		James G. Blaine Republican		Other candidates Various parties		Margin		Total votes cast
County	#	%	#	%	#	%	#	%	Total votes cast
Barbour	1,263	49.94%	1,241	49.07%	25	0.99%	22	0.87%	2,529
Berkeley	1,840	50.47%	1,763	48.35%	43	1.18%	77	2.11%	3,646
Boone	470	56.15%	362	43.25%	5	0.60%	108	12.90%	837
Braxton	1,441	63.37%	831	36.54%	2	0.09%	610	26.82%	2,274
Brooke	757	51.29%	704	47.70%	15	1.02%	53	3.59%	1,476
Cabell	1,872	56.15%	1,442	43.25%	20	0.60%	430	12.90%	3,334
Calhoun	753	59.81%	499	39.63%	7	0.56%	254	20.17%	1,259
Clay	306	51.34%	276	46.31%	14	2.35%	30	5.03%	596
Doddridge	989	44.17%	1,208	53.95%	42	1.88%	-219	-9.78%	2,239
Fayette	1,555	46.67%	1,753	52.61%	24	0.72%	-198	-5.94%	3,332
Gilmer	1,027	60.06%	674	39.42%	9	0.53%	353	20.64%	1,710
Grant	340	29.08%	826	70.66%	3	0.26%	-486	-41.57%	1,169
Greenbrier	1,834	62.44%	1,025	34.90%	78	2.66%	809	27.55%	2,937
Hampshire	1,748	81.15%	404	18.76%	2	0.09%	1,344	62.40%	2,154
Hancock	455	40.66%	655	58.53%	9	0.80%	-200	-17.87%	1,119
Hardy	1,116	80.29%	274	19.71%	0	0.00%	842	60.58%	1,390
Harrison	2,149	46.12%	2,383	51.14%	128	2.75%	-234	-5.02%	4,660
Jackson	1,694	48.03%	1,812	51.38%	21	0.60%	-118	-3.35%	3,527
Jefferson	2,254	68.12%	1,042	31.49%	13	0.39%	1,212	36.63%	3,309
Kanawha	2,820	39.23%	4,240	58.99%	128	1.78%	-1,420	-19.76%	7,188
Lewis	1,500	52.65%	1,331	46.72%	18	0.63%	169	5.93%	2,849
Lincoln	984	60.63%	638	39.31%	1	0.06%	346	21.32%	1,623
Logan	1,023	86.40%	161	13.60%	0	0.00%	862	72.80%	1,184
Marion	1,956	48.80%	1,958	48.85%	94	2.35%	-2	-0.05%	4,008
Marshall	1,734	41.94%	2,352	56.89%	48	1.16%	-618	-14.95%	4,134
Mason	2,007	44.95%	2,405	53.86%	53	1.19%	-398	-8.91%	4,465
McDowell	203	52.19%	186	47.81%	0	0.00%	17	4.37%	389
Mercer	947	67.16%	461	32.70%	2	0.14%	486	34.47%	1,410
Mineral	1,077	51.02%	985	46.66%	49	2.32%	92	4.36%	2,111
Monongalia	1,292	39.01%	1,988	60.02%	32	0.97%	-696	-21.01%	3,312
Monroe	1,176	53.99%	973	44.67%	29	1.33%	203	9.32%	2,178
Morgan	452	37.05%	754	61.80%	14	1.15%	-302	-24.75%	1,220
Nicholas	696	54.76%	549	43.19%	26	2.05%	147	11.57%	1,271
Ohio	4,461	50.30%	4,336	48.89%	72	0.81%	125	1.41%	8,869
Pendleton	844	58.45%	599	41.48%	1	0.07%	245	16.97%	1,444
Pleasants	685	55.06%	532	42.77%	27	2.17%	153	12.30%	1,244
Pocahontas	667	62.57%	389	36.49%	10	0.94%	278	26.08%	1,066
Preston	1,316	32.94%	2,625	65.71%	54	1.35%	-1,309	-32.77%	3,995
Putnam	1,102	46.03%	1,283	53.59%	9	0.38%	-181	-7.56%	2,394
Raleigh	773	56.59%	588	43.05%	5	0.37%	185	13.54%	1,366
Randolph	1,119	66.61%	554	32.98%	7	0.42%	565	33.63%	1,680
Ritchie	1,283	41.32%	1,720	55.39%	102	3.29%	-437	-14.07%	3,105
Roane	1,324	54.33%	1,100	45.14%	13	0.53%	224	9.19%	2,437
Summers	1,058	54.06%	871	44.51%	28	1.43%	187	9.56%	1,957
Taylor	1,147	44.49%	1,421	55.12%	10	0.39%	-274	-10.63%	2,578
Tucker	435	60.00%	289	39.86%	1	0.14%	146	20.14%	725
Tyler	1,040	42.38%	1,402	57.13%	12	0.49%	-362	-14.75%	2,454
Upshur	682	34.44%	1,267	63.99%	31	1.57%	-585	-29.55%	1,980
Wayne	1,780	63.19%	1,036	36.78%	1	0.04%	744	26.41%	2,817
Webster	427	71.40%	171	28.60%	0	0.00%	256	42.81%	598
Wetzel	1,947	64.73%	1,058	35.17%	3	0.10%	889	29.55%	3,008
Wirt	865	54.30%	713	44.76%	15	0.94%	152	9.54%	1,593
Wood	2,340	43.01%	2,721	50.01%	380	6.98%	-381	-7.00%	5,441
Wyoming	286	51.53%	266	47.93%	3	0.54%	20	3.60%	555
Totals	67,311	50.94%	63,096	47.75%	1,738	1.32%	4,215	3.19%	132,145

== See also ==
- United States presidential elections in West Virginia
