= Samuel D. Burchard =

Samuel D. Burchard may refer to:

- Samuel D. Burchard (politician) (1836–1901), member of the U.S. House of Representatives from Wisconsin
- Samuel D. Burchard (minister) (1812–1891), American Presbyterian minister from New York
