= 1884 United States presidential election in Missouri =

- November 4, 1884

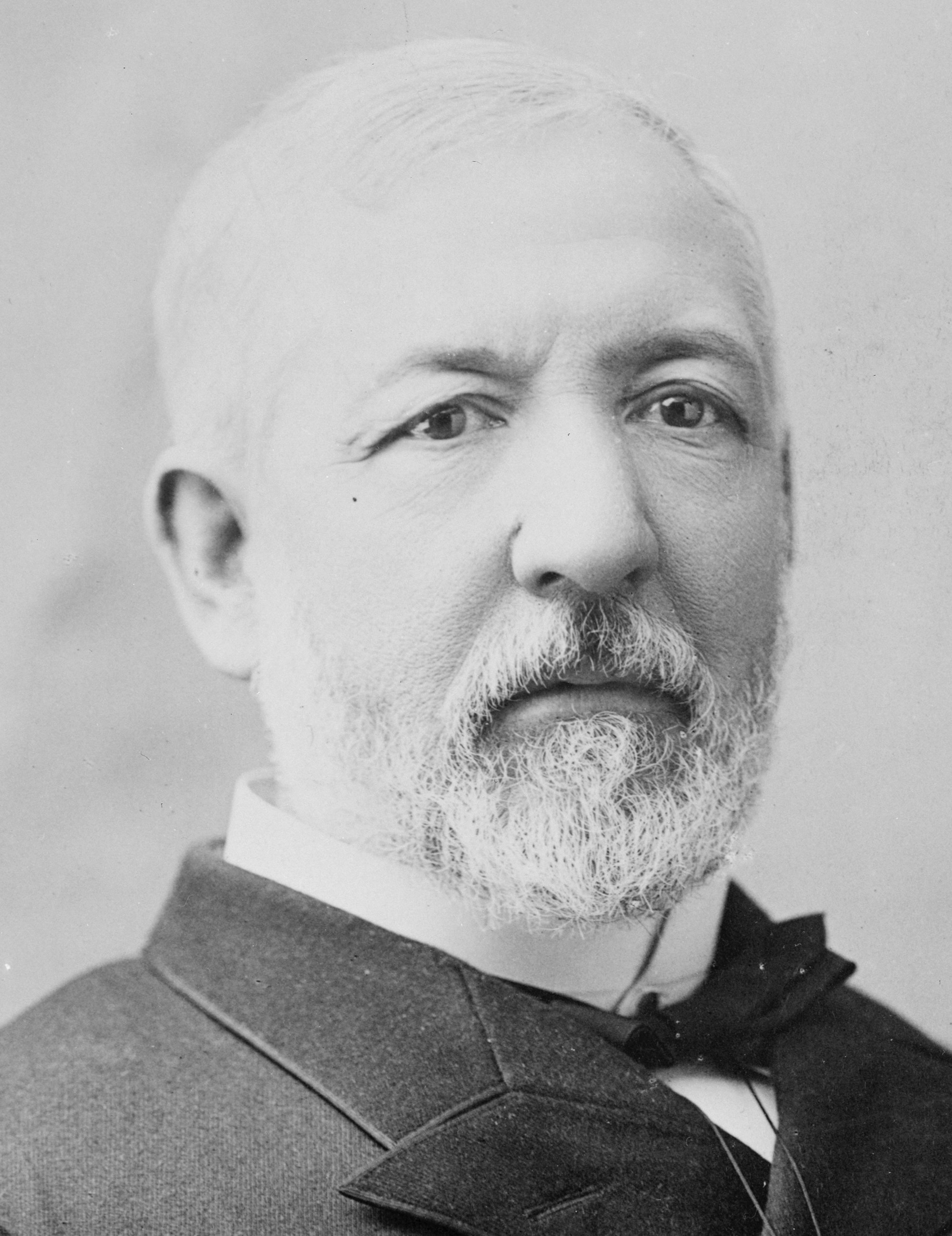
Nominee	Grover Cleveland	James G. Blaine
Party	Democratic	Republican
Alliance		Greenback
Home state	New York	Maine
Running mate	Thomas A. Hendricks	John A. Logan
Electoral vote	16	0
Popular vote	236,023	203,081
Percentage	53.49%	46.02%
County results
Cleveland
40–50%
50–60%
60–70%
70–80%
80–90%
Blaine
50–60%
60–70%
70–80%
President before election
Chester A. Arthur
Republican
Elected President
Grover Cleveland
Democratic

The 1884 United States presidential election in Missouri took place on November 4, 1884. All contemporary 38 states were part of the 1884 United States presidential election. Voters chose 16 electors to the Electoral College, which selected the president and vice president.

Missouri was won by Governor Grover Cleveland of New York, and Governor Thomas A. Hendricks of Indiana, with 53.49% of the vote, against former Secretary of State and Senator James G. Blaine of Maine and his running mate Senator John A. Logan of Illinois, with 46.02% of the vote.

== Results ==
1884 United States presidential election in Missouri
Party	Candidate	Votes	Percentage	Electoral votes
Democratic	Grover Cleveland	236,023	53.49%	16
Republican	James G. Blaine	203,081	46.02%	0
Prohibition	John St. John	2,164	0.49%	0

== See also ==
- United States presidential elections in Missouri
