= 1884 United States presidential election =

First election of Grover Cleveland

- November 4, 1884

401 members of the Electoral College 201 electoral votes needed to win
- Turnout: 77.5% (▼1.9 pp)

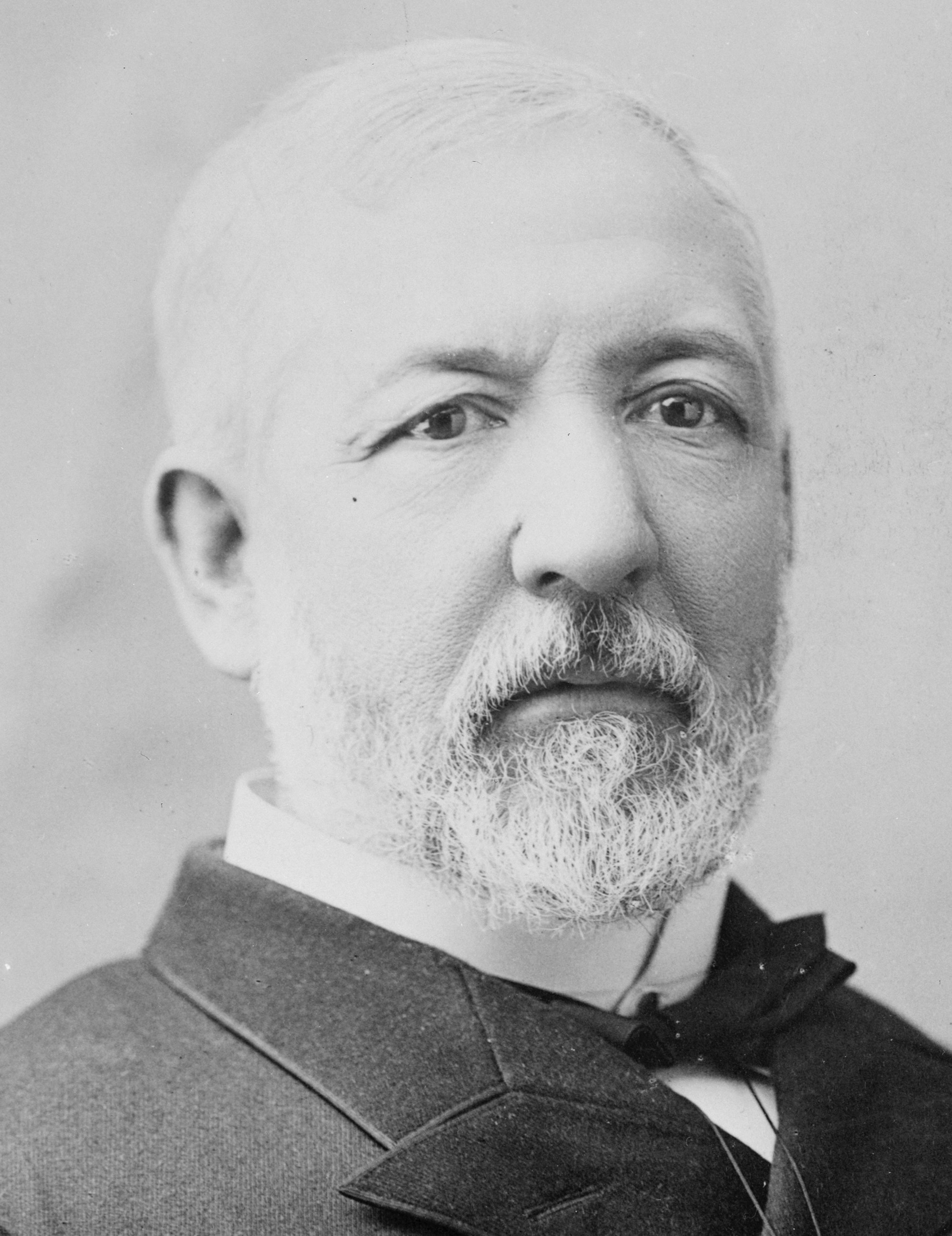
Nominee	Grover Cleveland	James G. Blaine
Party	Democratic	Republican
Home state	New York	Maine
Running mate	Thomas A. Hendricks	John A. Logan
Electoral vote	219	182
States carried	20	18
Popular vote	4,914,482	4,856,905
Percentage	48.8%	48.3%
- Presidential election results map. Blue denotes states won by Cleveland/Hendricks. Red denotes those won by Blaine/Logan. Numbers indicate the number of electoral votes allotted to each state.
President before election
Chester A. Arthur
Republican
Elected President
Grover Cleveland
Democratic

A presidential election was held in the United States on November 4, 1884. Democratic Governor Grover Cleveland of New York narrowly defeated Republican James G. Blaine of Maine, ending a streak of four consecutive Republican victories.

Cleveland won the presidential nomination on the second ballot of the 1884 Democratic National Convention. President Chester A. Arthur had acceded to the presidency in 1881 following the assassination of James A. Garfield, but he was unsuccessful in his bid for nomination to a full term. Blaine, who had served as Secretary of State under President Garfield, defeated Arthur and other candidates on the fourth ballot of the 1884 Republican National Convention. A group of reformist Republicans known as "Mugwumps" abandoned Blaine's candidacy, viewing him as corrupt. The campaign was characterized by mudslinging and personal allegations that eclipsed substantive issues, such as civil administration change, and it was marred by exceptional political acrimony and personal invective. Blaine's reputation for public corruption and his inadvertent last-minute alienation of Catholic voters proved decisive, as did voter exhaustion after a generation of Republican rule.

In the election, Cleveland won 48.8% of the nationwide popular vote and 219 electoral votes, carrying the Solid South and several key swing states. Blaine won 48.3% of the popular vote and 182 electoral votes. Cleveland won his home state by just 1,149 votes. Two third-party candidates, John St. John of the Prohibition Party and Benjamin Butler of the Greenback Party and the Anti-Monopoly Party, each won less than 2% of the popular vote.

Marking an interruption in the era when Republicans largely controlled the presidency between Reconstruction and the Great Depression, Cleveland (who would be elected to another non-consecutive term in 1892) was the first Democrat elected president since James Buchanan in 1856, the first to hold office since Andrew Johnson left the White House in 1869, and the last to hold office until Woodrow Wilson, who began his first term in 1913. Blaine became the only Republican nominee in the 52-year period from 1860 to 1912 never to win a presidential election. He was also the last former secretary of state to be nominated by a major political party until 2016. This election was also the last time there would be two consecutive presidential elections without an incumbent president on the ballot until 2028.

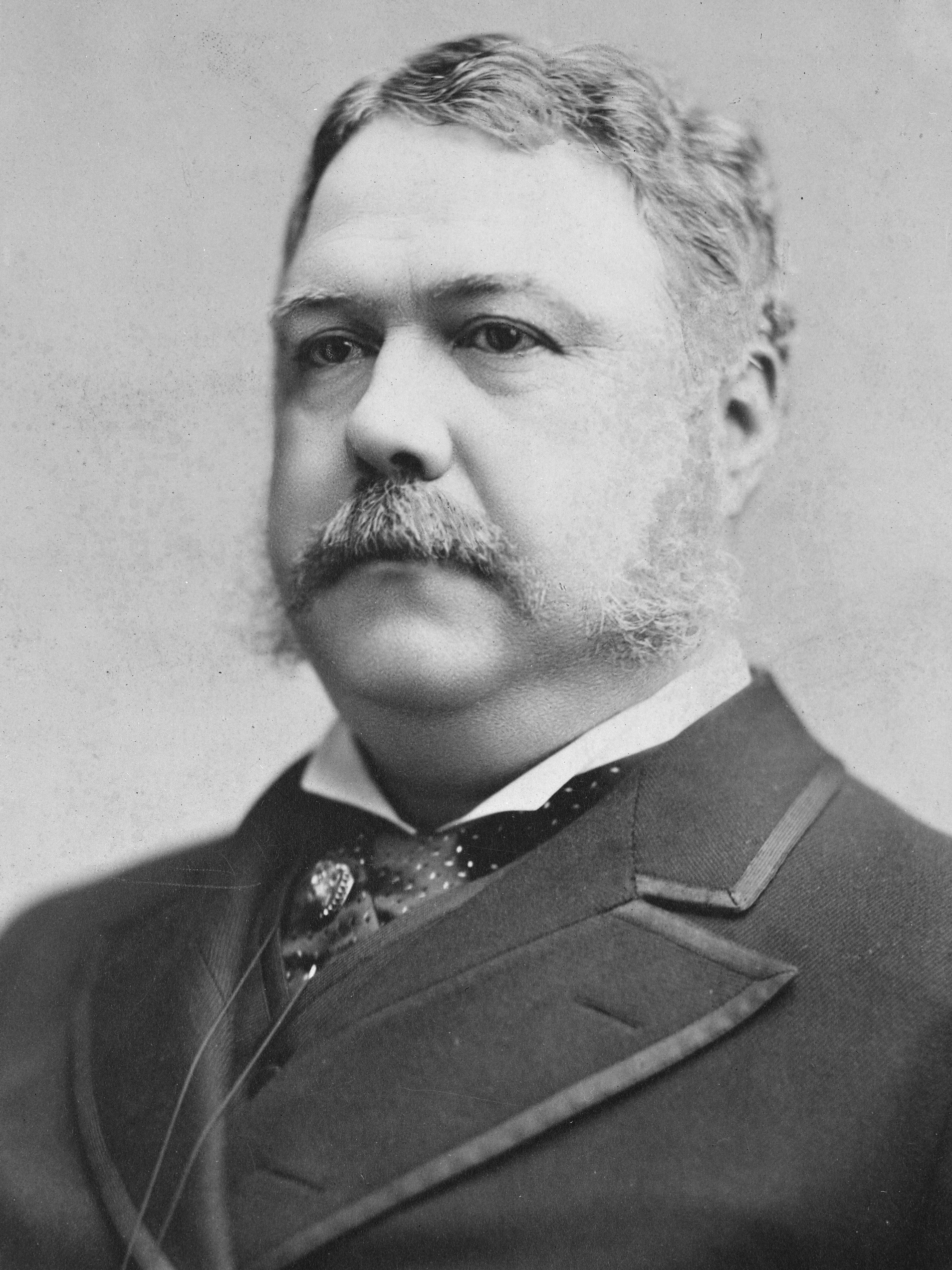
Chester A. Arthur, the incumbent president in 1884, whose partial term expired on March 4, 1885

== Nominations ==
=== Democratic Party nomination ===
Democratic Party (United States) 1884 Democratic Party ticket
Grover Cleveland	Thomas A. Hendricks
for President	for Vice President
28th Governor of New York (1883–1885)	16th Governor of Indiana (1873–1877)
Campaign

The Democrats convened in Chicago on July 8–11, 1884, with New York Governor Grover Cleveland as the clear frontrunner, the candidate of northern reformers and sound-money men (as opposed to inflationists). Although Tammany Hall bitterly opposed his nomination, the machine represented a minority of the New York delegation. Its only chance to block Cleveland was to break the unit rule, which mandated that the votes of an entire delegation be cast for only one candidate, and this it failed to do. Daniel N. Lockwood from New York placed Cleveland's name in nomination. But this rather lackluster address was eclipsed by the seconding speech of Edward S. Bragg from Wisconsin, who roused the delegates with a memorable slap at Tammany. "They love him, gentlemen," Bragg said of Cleveland, "and they respect him, not only for himself, for his character, for his integrity and judgment and iron will, but they love him most of all for the enemies he has made." As the convention rocked with cheers, Tammany boss John Kelly lunged at the platform, screaming that he welcomed the compliment.

On the first ballot, Cleveland led the field with 392 votes, more than 150 votes short of the nomination. Trailing him were Thomas F. Bayard from Delaware, 170; Allen G. Thurman from Ohio, 88; Samuel J. Randall from Pennsylvania, 78; and Joseph E. McDonald from Indiana, 56; with the rest scattered. Randall then withdrew in Cleveland's favor. This move, together with the Southern bloc scrambling aboard the Cleveland bandwagon, was enough to put him over the top of the second ballot, with 683 votes to 81.5 for Bayard and 45.5 for Thomas A. Hendricks from Indiana. Hendricks was nominated unanimously for vice president on the first ballot after John C. Black, William Rosecrans, and George Washington Glick withdrew their names from consideration.

=== Republican Party nomination ===
Republican Party (United States) 1884 Republican Party ticket
James G. Blaine	John A. Logan
for President	for Vice President
28th U.S. Secretary of State (1881)	U.S. Senator from Illinois (1871–1877 & 1879–1886)

The 1884 Republican National Convention was held in Chicago, Illinois, on June 3–6, with former Secretary of State James G. Blaine from Maine, President Arthur, and Senator George F. Edmunds from Vermont as the frontrunners. Though he was still popular, Arthur did not make a serious bid for a full-term nomination, knowing that his increasing health problems meant he would probably not survive a second term (he ultimately died in November 1886). Blaine led on the first ballot, with Arthur second, and Edmunds third. This order did not change on successive ballots as Blaine increased his lead, and he won a majority on the fourth ballot. After nominating Blaine, the convention chose Senator John A. Logan from Illinois as the vice-presidential nominee. Blaine remains the only presidential nominee ever to come from Maine.

Famed Civil War general William Tecumseh Sherman was considered a possible Republican candidate, but ruled himself out with what has become known as the Sherman pledge: "If drafted, I will not run; if nominated, I will not accept; if elected, I will not serve." Robert Todd Lincoln, Secretary of War of the United States, and son of the past President Abraham Lincoln, was also strongly courted by politicians and the media of the day to seek the presidential or vice-presidential nomination, but Lincoln was as averse to the nomination as Sherman.

=== Other parties and candidates ===
==== Anti-Monopoly Party nomination ====
Anti-Monopoly candidates:

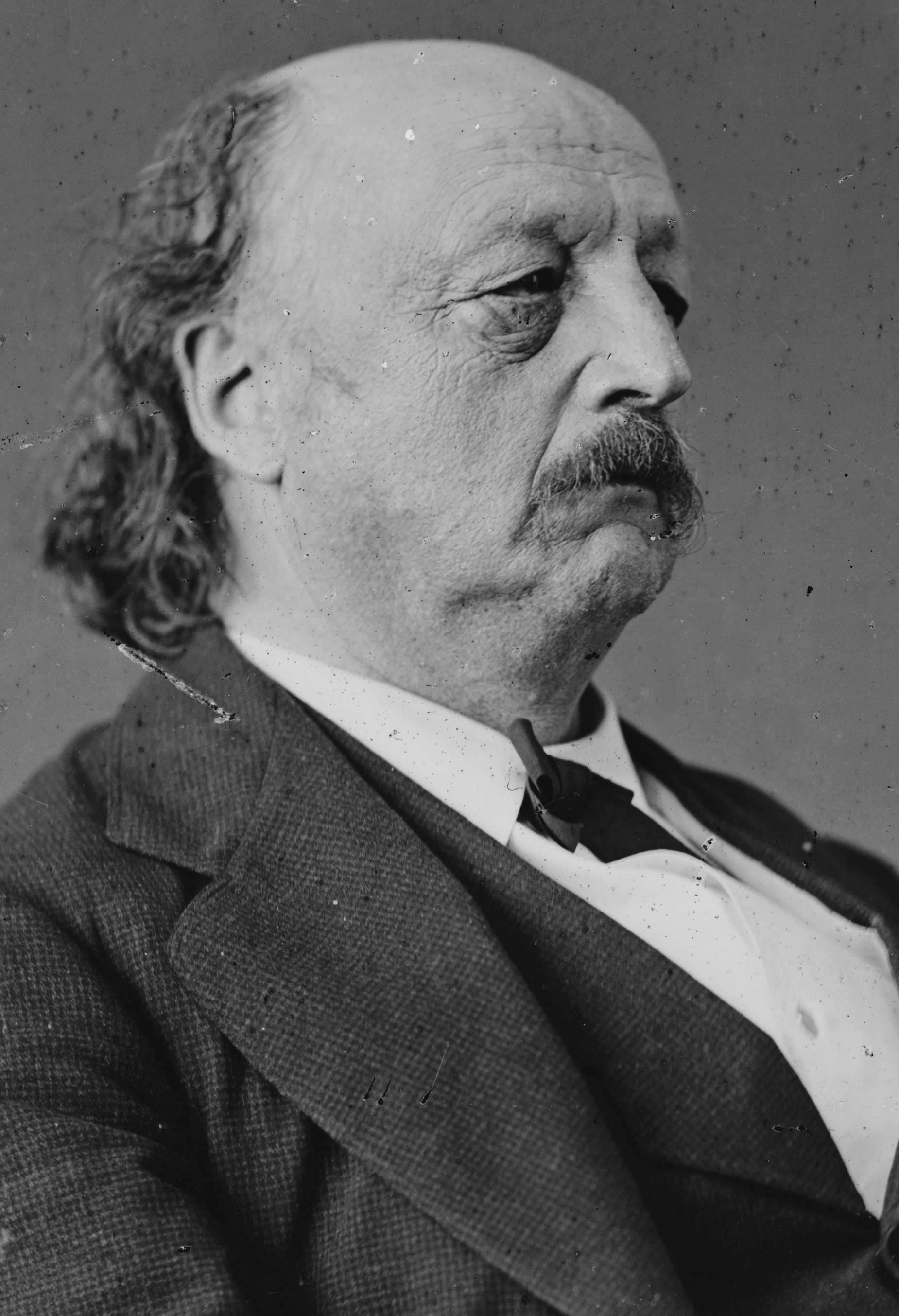
Benjamin Butler from Massachusetts

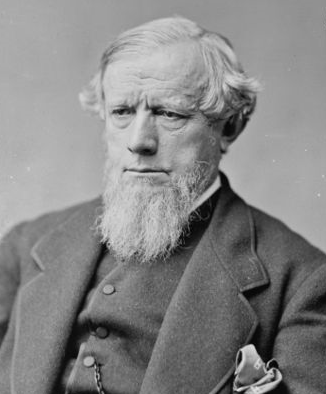
Allen G. Thurman from Ohio

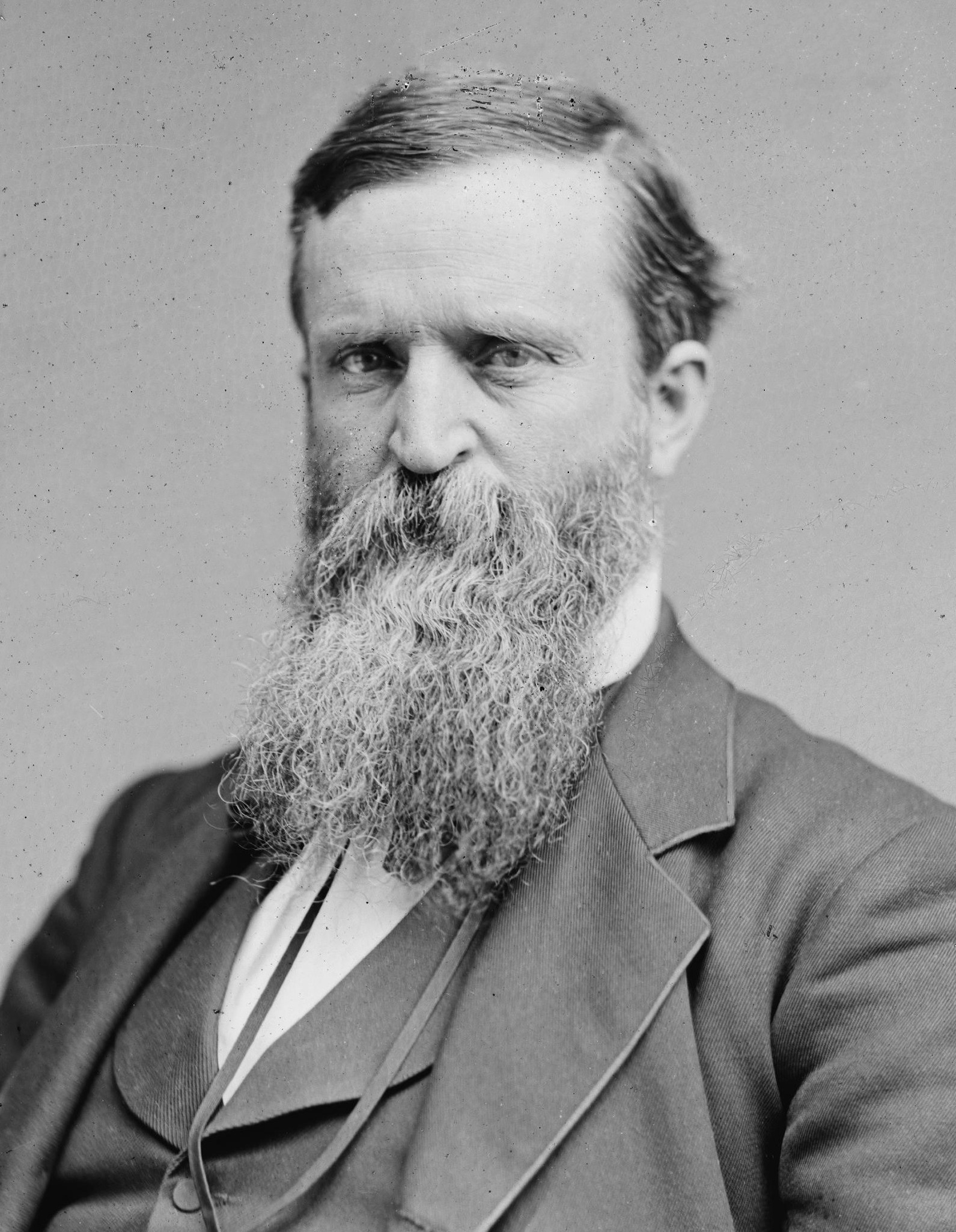
James B. Weaver from Iowa
(Declined to be nominated)

The Anti-Monopoly National Convention assembled in the Hershey Music Hall in Chicago, Illinois on May 14. The party had been formed to express opposition to the business practices of the emerging nationwide companies. There were around 200 delegates from 16 states, but 61 of them were from Michigan and Illinois.

Alson Streeter was the temporary chairman and John F. Henry was the permanent chairman.

Benjamin Butler was nominated for president on the first ballot. Delegates from New York, Washington, D.C., and Maryland bolted the convention when it appeared that no discussion of other candidates would be allowed. Allen G. Thurman and James B. Weaver were put forward as alternatives to Butler, but Weaver declined, not wishing to run another national campaign for political office, and Thurman generated little enthusiasm. Butler, while far from opposed to the nomination, hoped to be nominated by the Democratic or Republican party, or at least in the case of the former, to make its platform more favorable to greenbacks. Ultimately only the Greenback Party endorsed his candidacy.

The convention chose not to nominate a candidate for vice president, hoping other conventions would endorse a similar platform and name a suitable vice-presidential nominee. The committee ultimately nominated Absolom Madden West as their vice-presidential candidate.

Presidential Ballot
Ballot	1st
Benjamin Butler	124
Allen G. Thurman (Note: Published sources disagree on how many votes Thurman received on the ballot. Hinshaw claims he received 7 votes, but Havel finds only 2.)	2
Solon Chase	1

==== Greenback Party nomination ====
Greenback candidates:

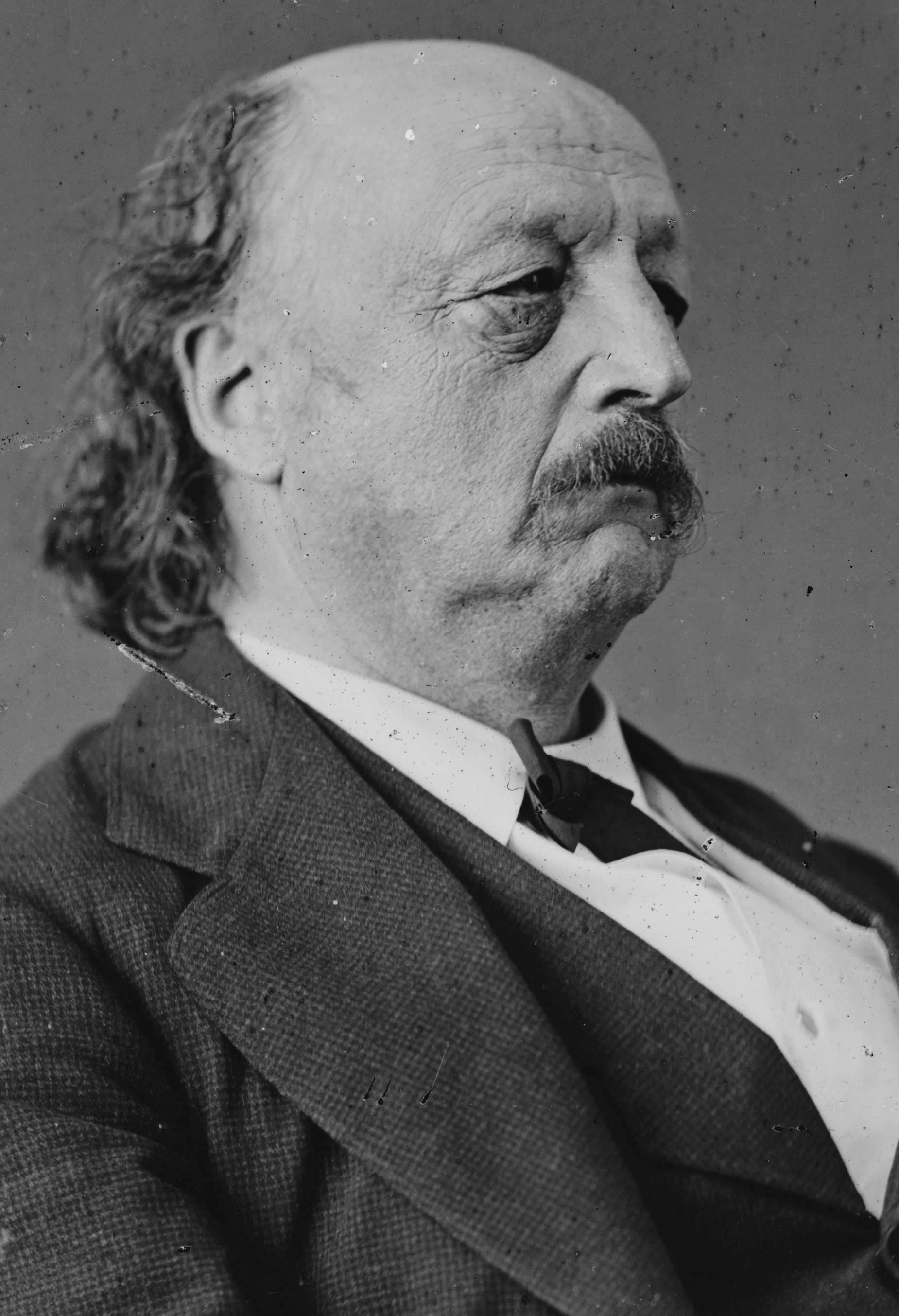
Benjamin Butler from Massachusetts

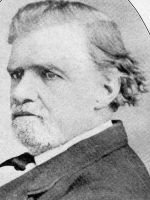
Party Chairman Jesse Harper from Illinois

The third Greenback National Convention assembled in English's Opera House in Indianapolis, Indiana. Delegates from 28 states and the District of Columbia were in attendance. The convention nominated former Massachusetts Governor Benjamin Butler for president over party chairman Jesse Harper on the first ballot. Mississippi State Senator Absolom M. West was nominated unanimously for vice president. The ticket was subsequently adopted by the Anti-Monopoly Party.

Butler initially hoped to organize fusion tickets with the minority party in each state, a strategy designed to capitalize on the cross-partisan popularity of many elements of the candidate's program. The Greenbacks succeeded in negotiating fusion arrangements with the Democrats in Iowa, Michigan, and Nebraska and with the Republicans in Missouri and West Virginia. The fusion electors agreed to divide their votes between Butler and Cleveland, or Butler and Blaine, in proportion to the statewide popular vote for each candidate; however, the fusion ticket was not elected in any state, and Butler received no votes in the Electoral College.

Presidential Ballot
Ballot	1st
Benjamin Butler	323
Jesse Harper	98
Solon Chase	2
Edward Phelps Allis	1
David Davis	0

==== American Prohibition Party nomination ====
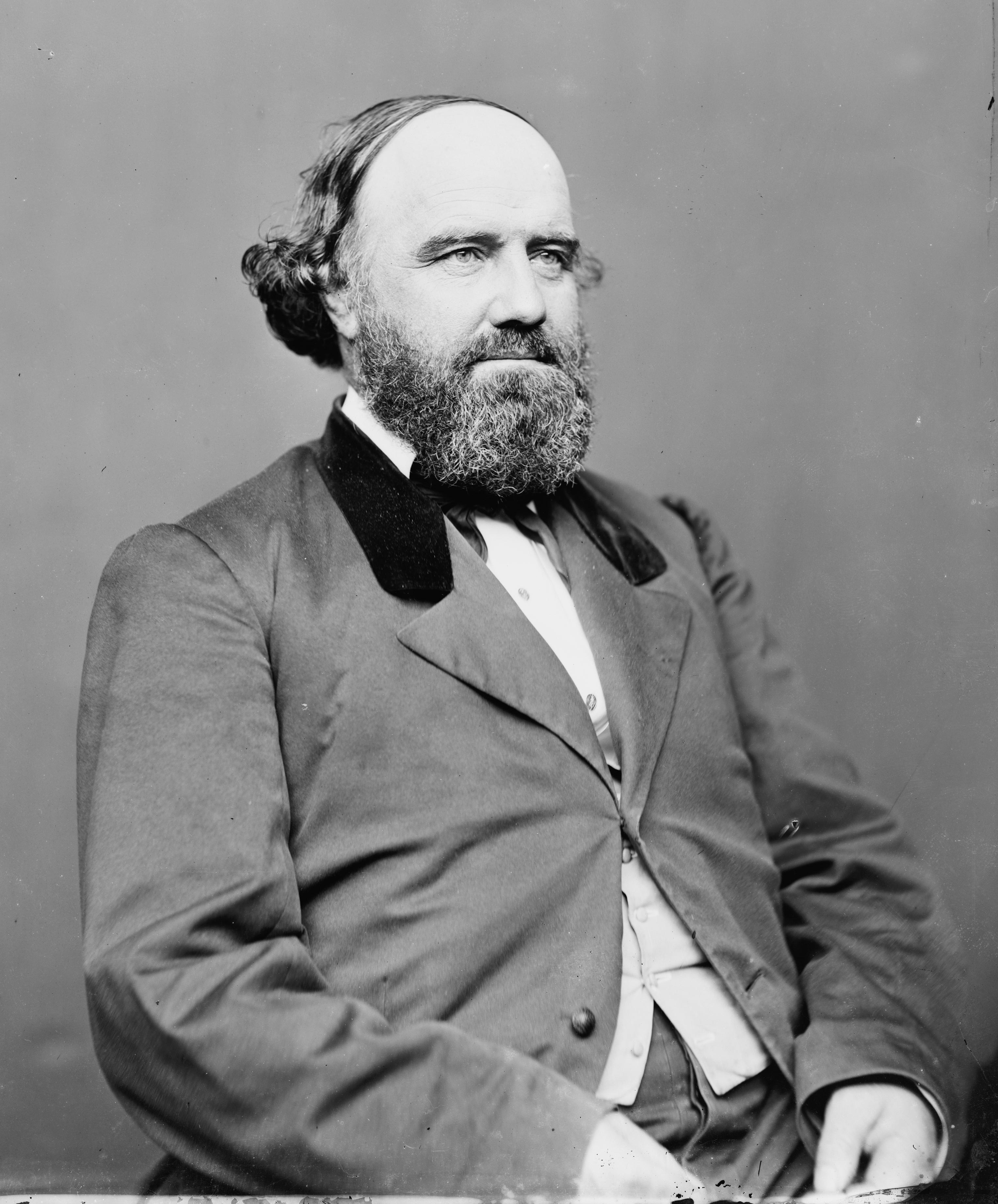
Samuel C. Pomeroy from Kansas
(Withdrew Aug 27, 1884)
(Endorsed John St. John)

The American Prohibition Party held its national convention in the YMCA building in Chicago, Illinois. There were 150 delegates, including many non-voting delegates. The party sought to merge the reform movements of anti-masonry, prohibition, anti-polygamy, and direct election of the president into a new party. Jonathan Blanchard was a major figure within the party. He traveled throughout northern states in the spring and gave an address entitled "The American Party – Its Principles and Its Claims."

During the convention, the party name was changed from the American Party to the American Prohibition Party. The party had been known as the Anti-Masonic Party in 1880. Many of the delegates at the convention were initially interested in nominating John St. John, the former governor of Kansas, but it was feared that such a nomination might cost him that of the Prohibition Party, which he was actively seeking. Party leaders met with Samuel C. Pomeroy, a former senator from the same state who was the convention's runner-up for the nomination, and at Pomeroy's suggestion they agreed to withdraw the ticket from the race should St. John win the Prohibition Party nomination. Nominated alongside Pomeroy was John A. Conant from Connecticut.

St. John later unanimously won the Prohibition Party nomination, with Pomeroy and Conant withdrawing from the presidential contest and endorsing him. The New York Times speculated that the endorsement would "give him 40,000 votes".

==== Prohibition Party nomination ====
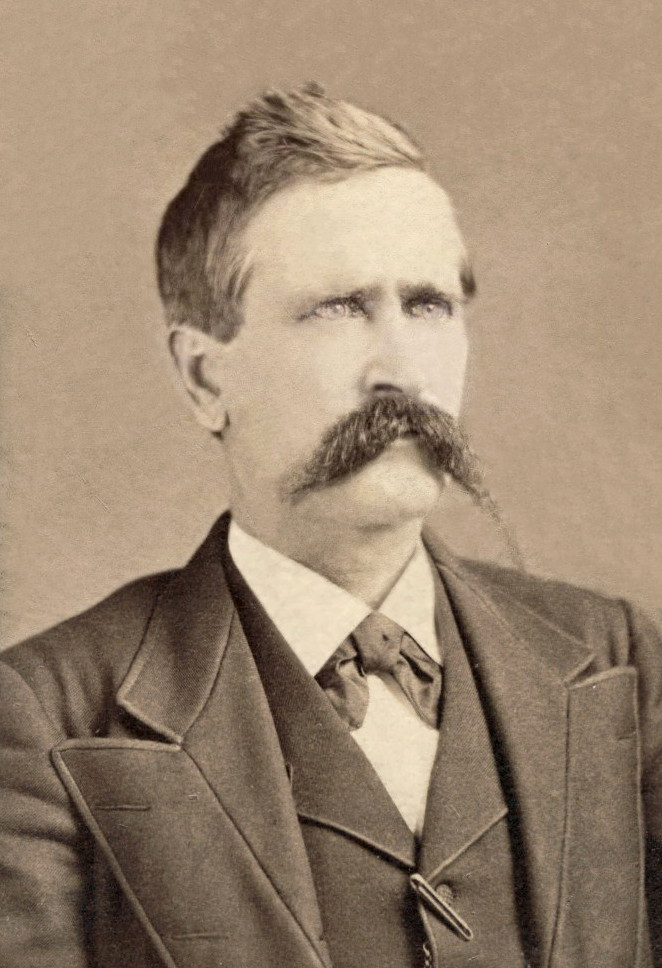
John St. John from Kansas

The fourth Prohibition Party National Convention assembled in Lafayette Hall, Pittsburgh, Pennsylvania. There were 505 delegates from 31 states and territories at the convention. The national ticket was nominated unanimously: John St. John for president and William Daniel for vice president. The straightforward single-issue Prohibition Party platform advocated the criminalization of alcoholic beverages.

Presidential Ballot
Ballot	1st
John St. John	505

==== Equal Rights Party nomination ====
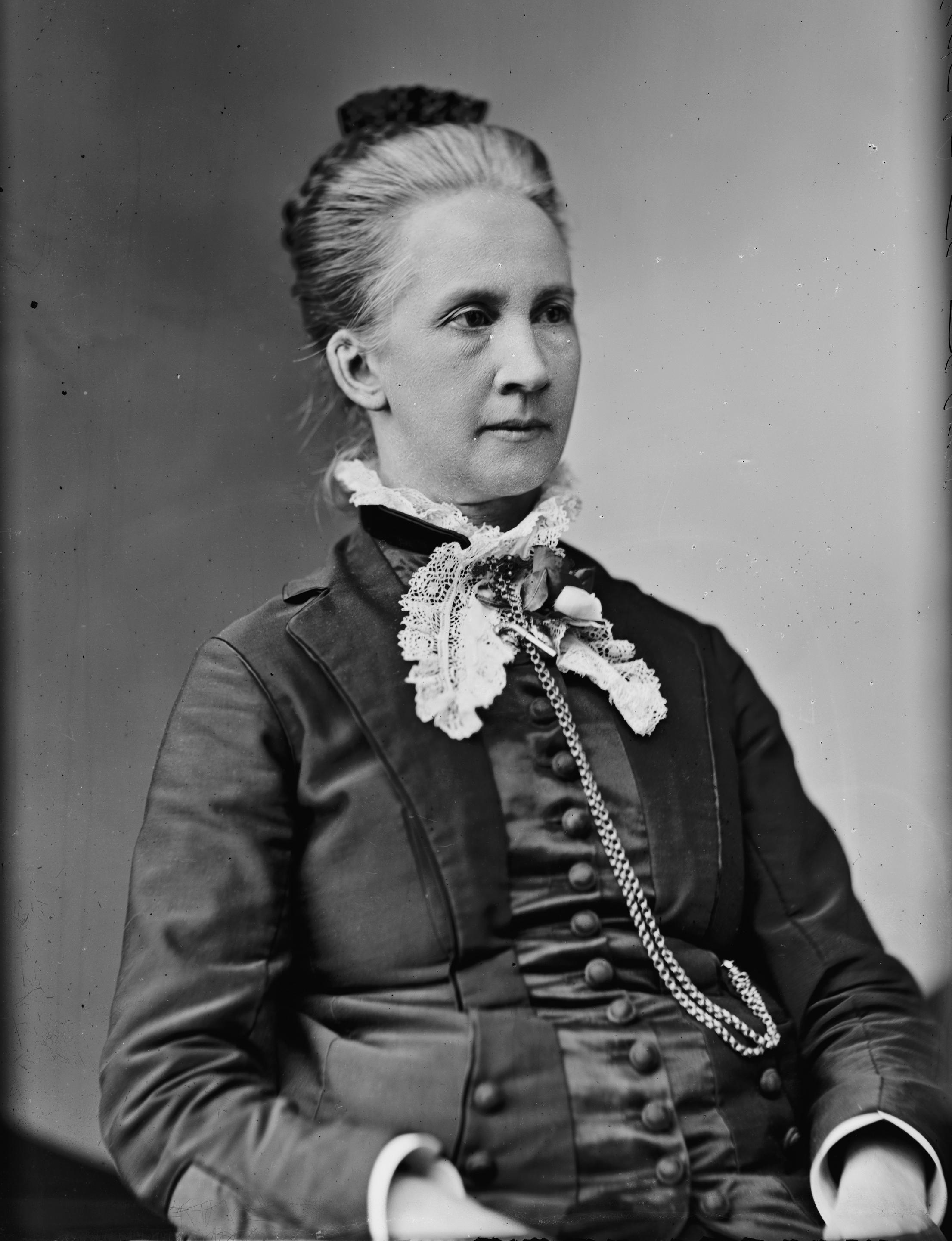
Lawyer and Suffragette Belva Ann Lockwood from Washington, D.C.

Dissatisfied with resistance by the men of the major parties to women's suffrage, a small group of women announced the formation in 1884 of the Equal Rights Party.

The Equal Rights Party held its national convention in San Francisco, California, on September 20. The convention nominated Belva Ann Lockwood, an attorney in Washington, D.C., for president. Chairman Marietta Stow, the first woman to preside over a national nominating convention, was nominated for vice president.

Lockwood agreed to be the party's presidential candidate even though most women in the United States did not yet have the right to vote. She said, "I cannot vote but I can be voted for." She was the first woman to run a full campaign for the office (Victoria Woodhull conducted a more limited campaign in 1872). The Equal Rights Party had no treasury, but Lockwood gave lectures to pay for campaign travel. She received approximately 4,194 votes nationally.

== General election ==
=== Campaign ===
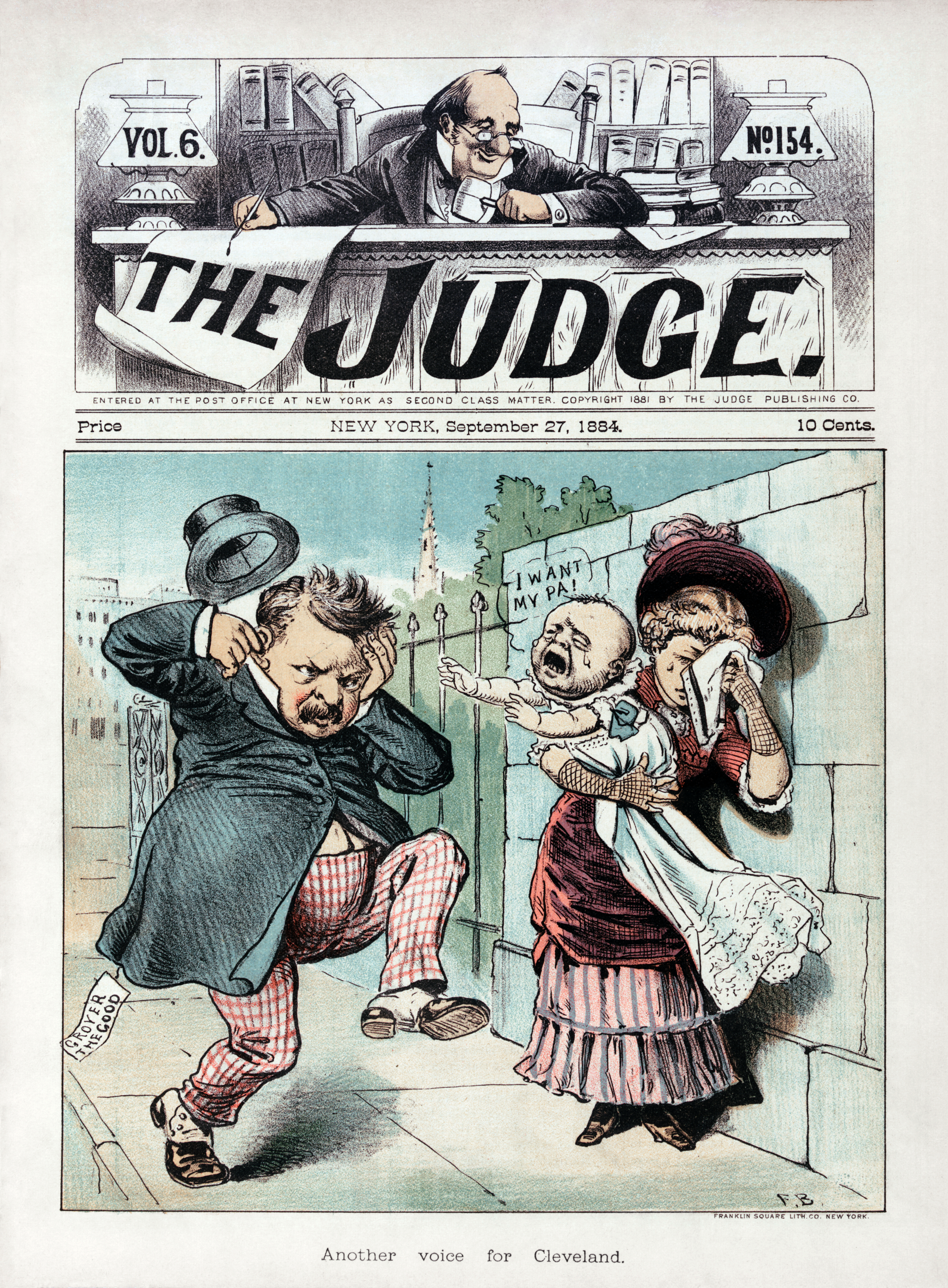
Campaign poster attacking Cleveland's morals

The issue of personal character was paramount in the 1884 campaign. Blaine had been prevented from getting the Republican presidential nomination during the previous two elections because of the stigma of the "Mulligan letters": in 1876, a Boston bookkeeper named James Mulligan had located some letters showing that Blaine had sold his influence in Congress to various businesses. One such letter ended with the phrase "burn this letter", from which a popular chant of the Democrats arose – "Burn, burn, burn this letter!" In just one deal, he received $110,150 (over $1.5 million in 2010 dollars) from the Little Rock and Fort Smith Railroad for securing a federal land grant, among other things. Democrats and anti-Blaine Republicans made unrestrained attacks on his integrity as a result. Cleveland, on the other hand, was known as "Grover the Good" for his personal integrity; in the space of the three previous years he had become the mayor of Buffalo, New York successively, and then the governor of the state of New York, cleaning up large amounts of Tammany Hall's graft.

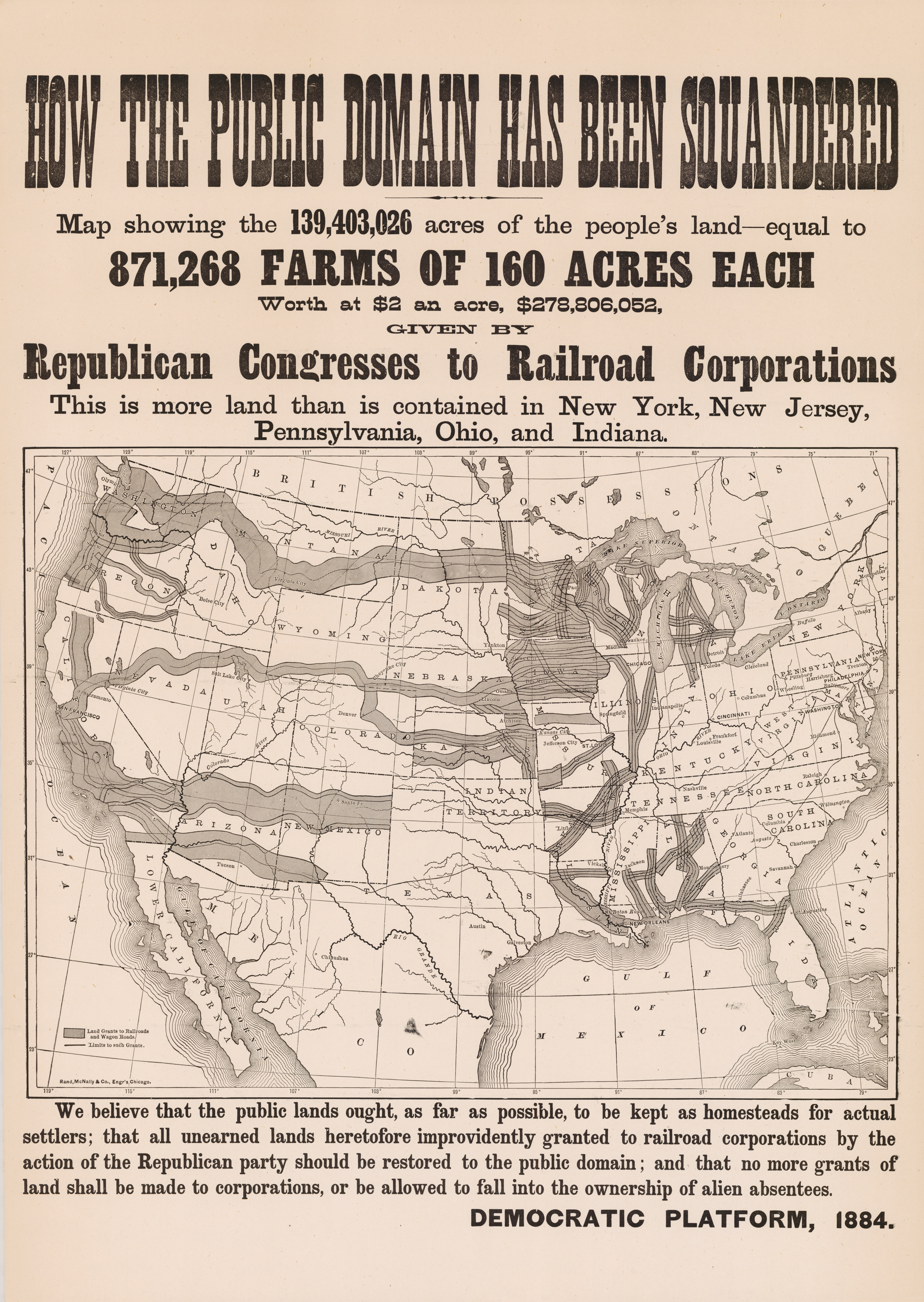
This campaign poster purports to show the area of land grants to railroads

Commentator Jeff Jacoby notes that, "Not since George Washington had a candidate for president been so renowned for his rectitude." In July the Republicans found a refutation buried in Cleveland's past. Aided by sermons from a minister named George H. Ball, they charged that Cleveland had fathered an illegitimate child while he was a lawyer in Buffalo. When confronted with the scandal, Cleveland immediately instructed his supporters to "Above all, tell the truth." Cleveland admitted to paying child support in 1874 to Maria Bertha Halpin, the woman who claimed he fathered her child, named Oscar Folsom Cleveland after Cleveland's friend and law partner, but asserted that the child's paternity was uncertain. Shortly before election day, the Republican media published an affidavit from Halpin in which she stated that until she met Cleveland her "life was pure and spotless," and "there is not, and never was, a doubt as to the paternity of our child, and the attempt of Grover Cleveland, or his friends, to couple the name of Oscar Folsom, or any one else, with that boy, for that purpose is simply infamous and false." In a supplemental affidavit, Halpin also implied Cleveland had raped her, hence the conception of their child. Republican cartoonists across the land had a field day.

Cleveland's campaign decided that candor was the best approach to this scandal: it admitted that Cleveland had formed an "illicit connection" with the mother and that a child had been born and given the Cleveland surname. They also noted that there was no proof that Cleveland was the father and claimed that, by assuming responsibility and finding a home for the child, he was merely doing his duty. Finally, they showed that the mother had not been forced into an asylum; her whereabouts were unknown. Blaine's supporters condemned Cleveland in the strongest terms, singing "Ma, Ma, Where's my Pa?" (After Cleveland's victory, Cleveland supporters would respond to the taunt with: "Gone to the White House, Ha, Ha, Ha.") However, the Cleveland campaign's damage control worked well enough and the race remained a toss-up through Election Day. The greatest threat to the Republicans came from reformers called "Mugwumps" who were angrier at Blaine's public corruption than at Cleveland's private affairs.

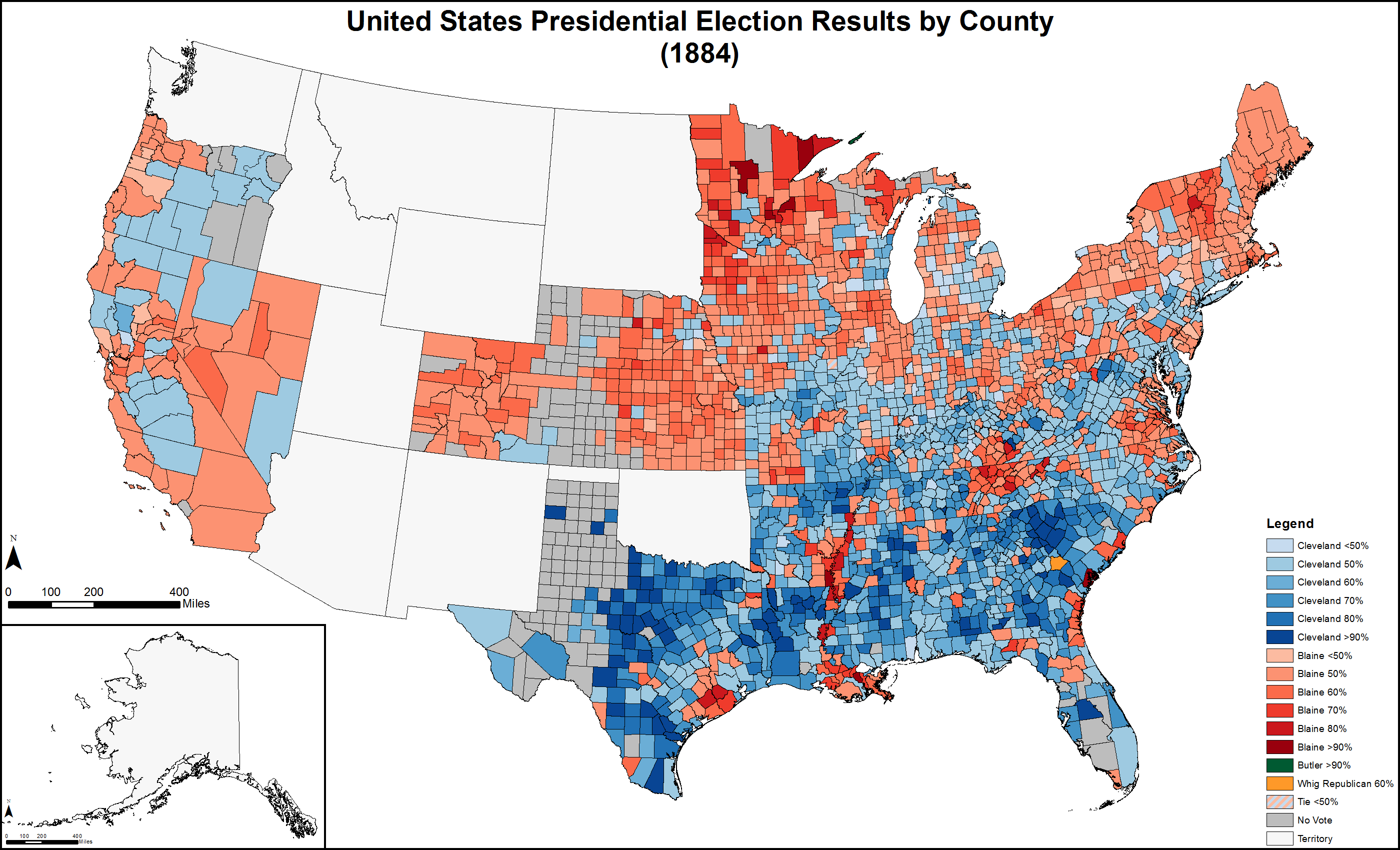
Results by county explicitly indicating the percentage of the winning candidate in each county. Shades of blue are for Cleveland (Democratic), shades of red are for Blaine (Republican), shades of green are for Butler (Straight Greenback), and shades of yellow are for bolting electors (Whig Republican).

In the final week of the campaign, the Blaine campaign suffered a catastrophe. At a Republican meeting attended by Blaine, a group of New York preachers castigated the Mugwumps. Their spokesman, Reverend Dr. Samuel Burchard, said, "We are Republicans, and don't propose to leave our party and identify ourselves with the party whose antecedents have been rum, Romanism, and rebellion." Blaine did not notice Burchard's anti-Catholic slur, nor did the assembled newspaper reporters, but a Democratic operative did, and Cleveland's campaign managers made sure it was widely publicized. The statement energized the Irish and Catholic vote in New York City heavily against Blaine, costing him New York state and the election by a narrow margin.

In addition to Burchard's statement, it is also believed that John St. John's campaign was responsible for winning Cleveland the election in New York. Since Prohibitionists tended to ally more with Republicans, the Republican Party attempted to convince St. John to drop out. When they failed, they resorted to slandering him. Because of this, he redoubled his efforts in upstate New York, where Blaine was vulnerable on his prohibition stance, and took votes away from the Republicans. Republican turnout in upstate New York was hampered by heavy rains.

== Results ==
35.6% of the voting-age population and 78.3% of eligible voters participated in the election.

While the results remained broadly the same as those from 1880, Cleveland narrowly won three states (New York, Indiana, and Connecticut) that James A. Garfield had won, while Blaine won two states (California and Nevada) that Winfield Hancock had won. But most of those states had relatively small numbers of electoral votes, and Cleveland's victory in New York was decisive. Cleveland won by a slightly larger margin than Garfield (0.57% compared to 0.11%) in the popular vote, but a slightly smaller margin in the Electoral College (29 votes to 59). Cleveland became the first Democrat to ever win without Pennsylvania, California, Nevada, and Illinois. Pennsylvania voted for the losing candidate for the first time since 1824, and the loser of the popular vote since 1800.

The result marked an electoral breakthrough for the Prohibition Party, which had been little more than a fringe party in the previous three elections. While they never seriously challenged for the presidency and had only limited success in congressional and state-level elections, they regularly earned at least a percentage point of the popular vote (and occasionally finished third in that vote) in presidential elections for the next three decades before declining back to fringe status after the passage of the Eighteenth Amendment in 1919. By contrast, Butler earned less than half the popular vote share that James B. Weaver had won in 1880, accelerating the decline of the Greenback Party. This was the last presidential election the party contested; it collapsed after failing to nominate a ticket in 1888.

This election was one of only four U.S. presidential elections, held since the Democrats and Republicans became the two major parties in U.S. politics, in which the winner did not carry any of the three Rust Belt states of Michigan, Pennsylvania, and Wisconsin; the others were 1916, 2000, and 2004.

16.08% of Blaine's votes came from the eleven states of the former Confederacy, with him taking 40.15% of the vote in that region.

In Burke County, Georgia, 895 votes were cast for bolting "Whig Republican" electors for president (they were not counted for Blaine). The Republicans won in 20 of the 33 cities with populations over 50,000 outside the southern U.S.

Electoral results
Presidential candidate	Party	Home state	Popular vote		Electoral vote	Running mate		
Presidential candidate	Party	Home state	Count	Percentage	Electoral vote	Vice-presidential candidate	Home state	Electoral vote
Grover Cleveland	Democratic	New York	4,914,482	48.85%	219	Thomas A. Hendricks	Indiana	219
James G. Blaine	Republican	Maine	4,856,903	48.28%	182	John A. Logan	Illinois	182
John St. John	Prohibition	Kansas	147,482	1.50%	0	William Daniel	Maryland	0
Benjamin Butler	Greenback/Anti-Monopoly	Massachusetts	134,294	1.33%	0	Absolom M. West	Mississippi	0
Belva Ann Lockwood	Equal Rights	Washington, D.C.	4,194	0.04%	0	Marietta Stow	California	0
Other			3,576	0.04%	—	Other		—
Total			10,060,145	100%	401			401
Needed to win					201			201

Source (Popular Vote): Leip, David. "1884 Presidential Election Results". Dave Leip's Atlas of U.S. Presidential Elections.

Source (Electoral Vote): "Electoral College Box Scores 1789–1996". National Archives and Records Administration.

Popular vote
Cleveland	48.85%
Blaine	48.28%
St. John	1.50%
Butler	1.33%
Others	0.09%

Electoral vote
Cleveland	54.61%
Blaine	45.39%

=== Geography of results ===
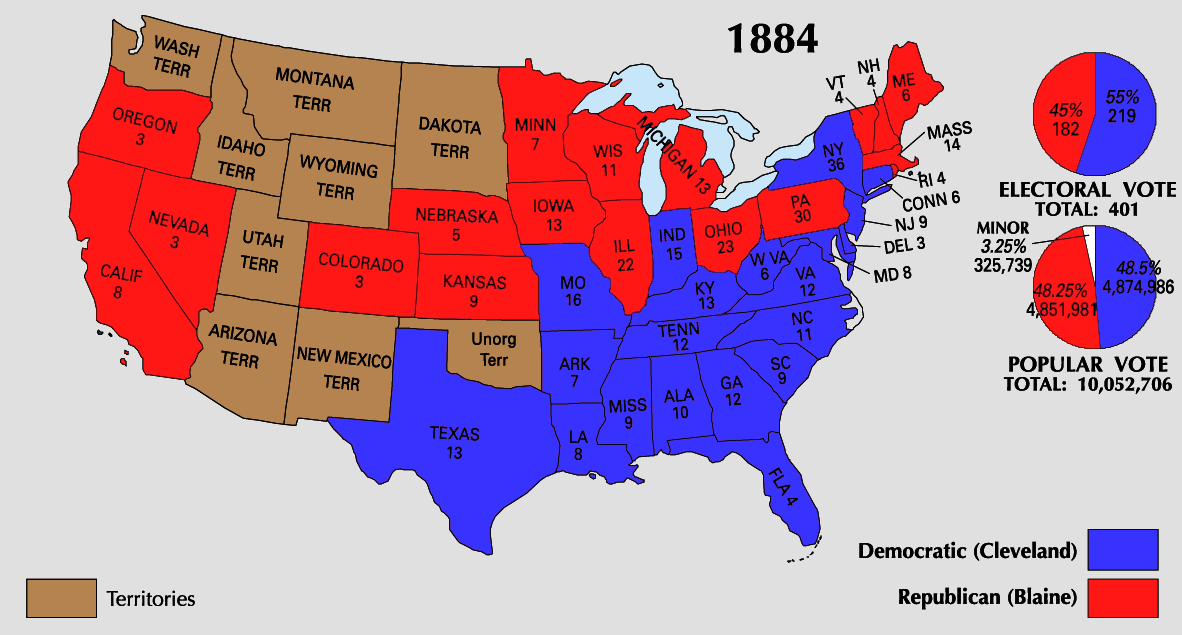

Results by county, shaded according to the winning candidate's percentage of the vote

==== Cartographic gallery ====
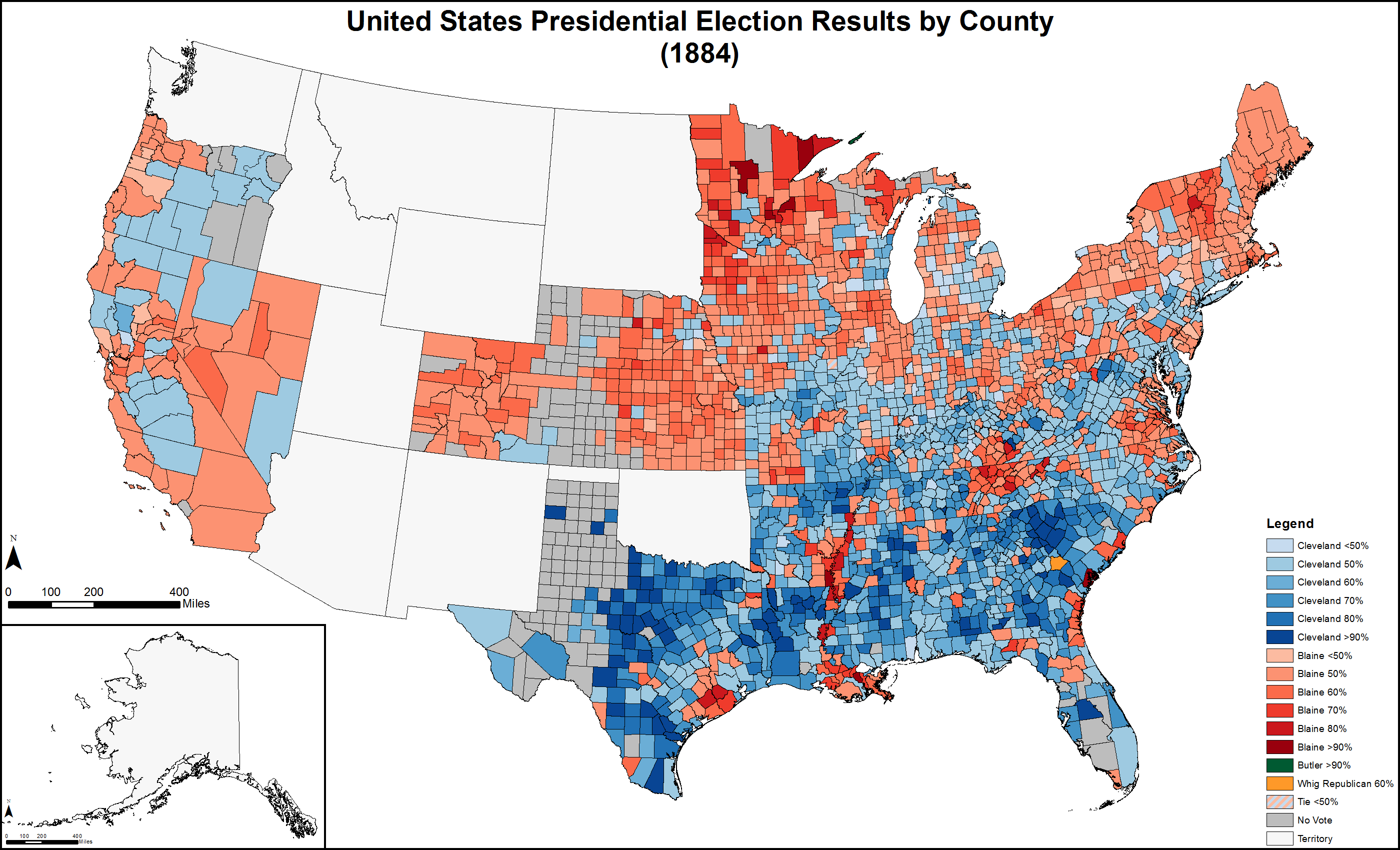
Map of presidential election results by county

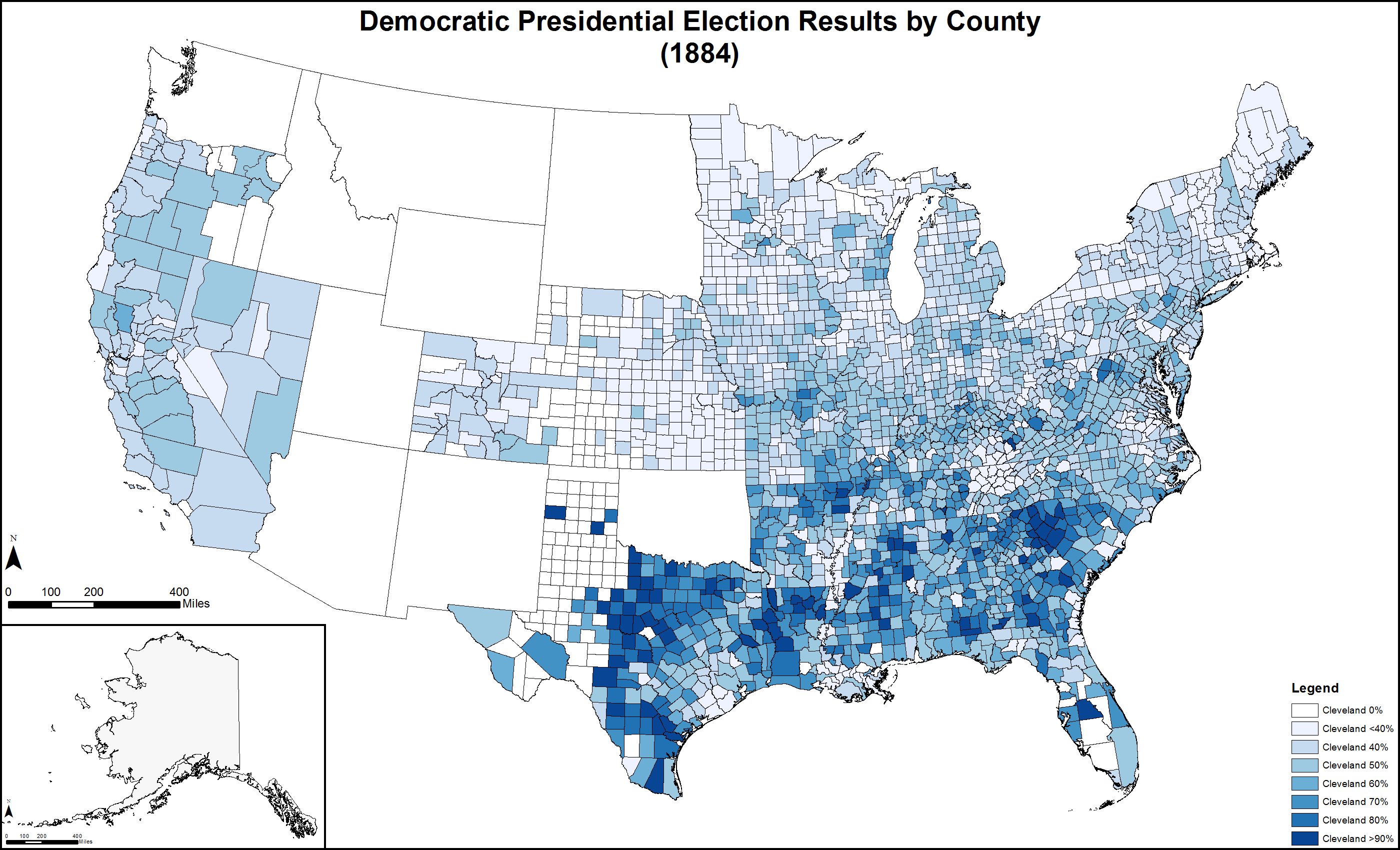
Map of Democratic presidential election results by county

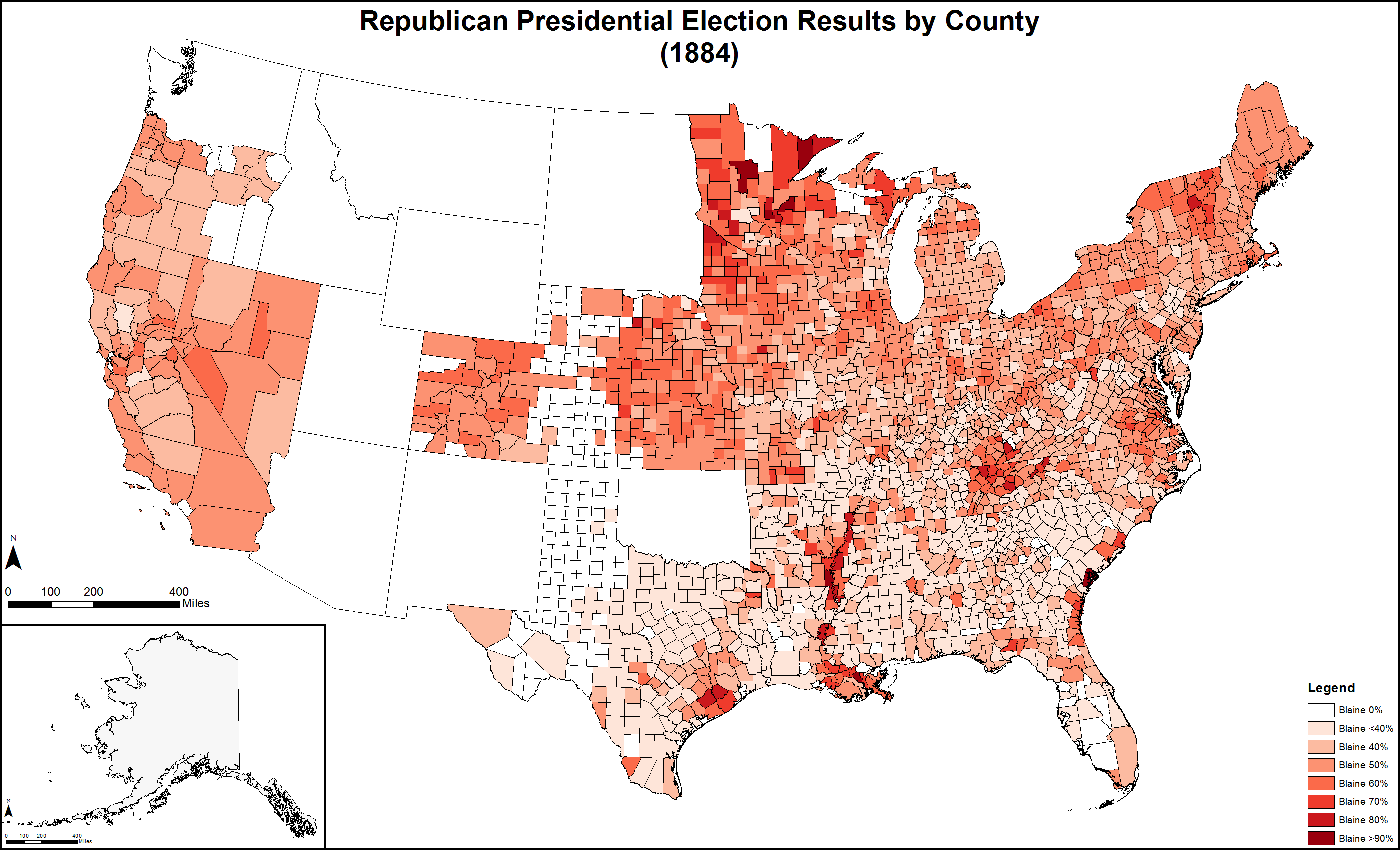
Map of Republican presidential election results by county

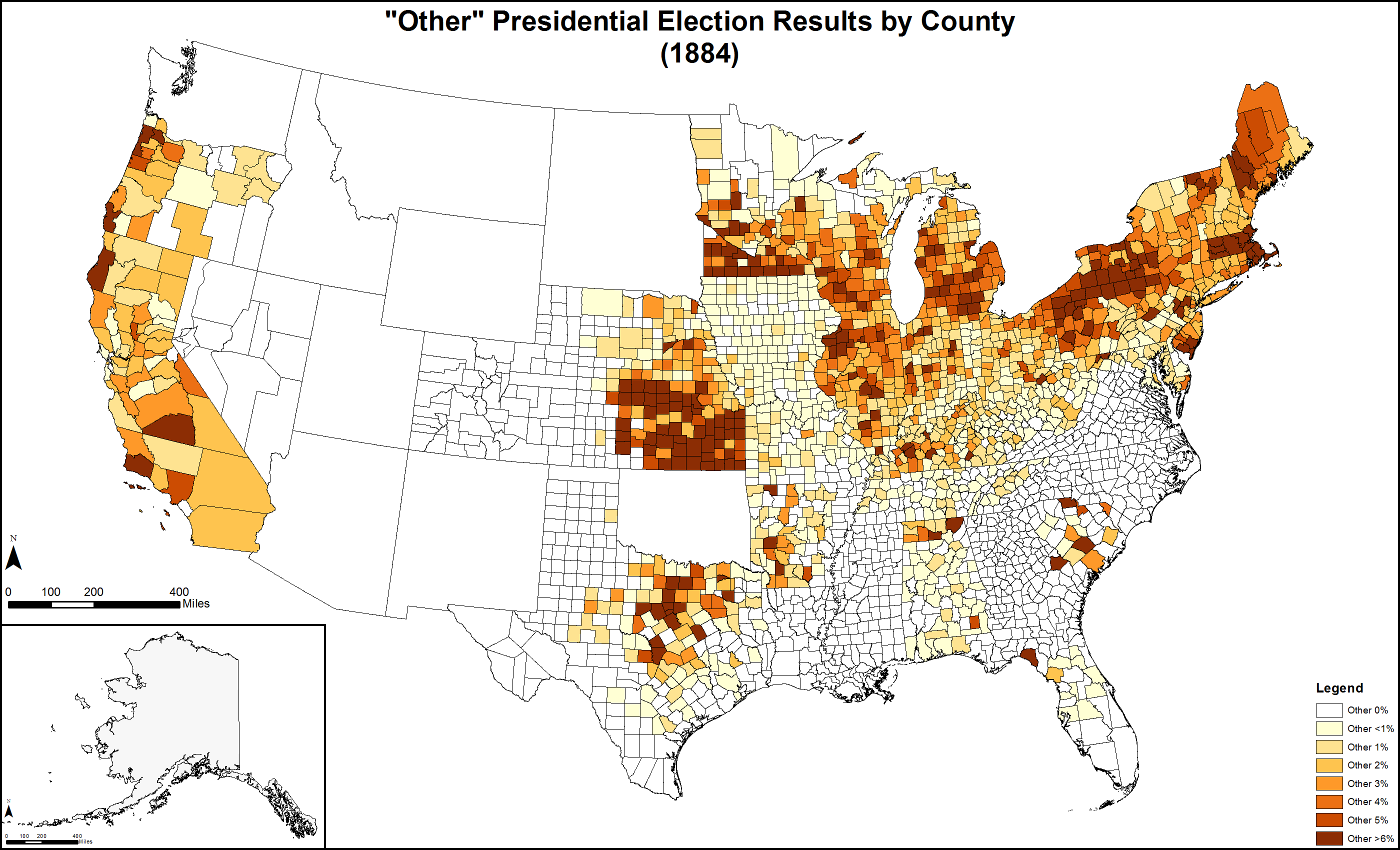
Map of "other" presidential election results by county

=== Results by state ===
Source: Data from Walter Dean Burnham, Presidential ballots, 1836–1892 (Johns Hopkins University Press, 1955) pp 247–57.

States/districts won by Cleveland/Hendricks
States/districts won by Blaine/Logan

		Grover Cleveland Democratic			James Blaine Republican			John St. John Prohibition			Benjamin Butler Greenback			Margin		State Total	
State	electoral votes	#	%	electoral votes	#	%	electoral votes	#	%	electoral votes	#	%	electoral votes	#	%	#	
Alabama	10	92,736	60.37	10	59,444	38.69	–	610	0.40	–	762	0.50	–	33,292	21.67	153,624	AL
Arkansas	7	72,734	57.83	7	51,198	40.70	–	–	–	–	1,847	1.47	–	21,536	17.12	125,779	AR
California	8	89,288	45.33	–	102,369	51.97	8	2,965	1.51	–	2,037	1.03	–	−13,081	−6.64	196,988	CA
Colorado	3	27,723	41.68	–	36,084	54.25	3	756	1.14	–	1,956	2.94	–	−8,361	−12.57	66,519	CO
Connecticut	6	67,182	48.95	6	65,898	48.01	–	2,493	1.82	–	1,684	1.23	–	1,284	0.94	137,257	CT
Delaware	3	16,957	56.55	3	12,953	43.20	–	64	0.21	–	10	0.03	–	4,004	13.35	29,984	DE
Florida	4	31,769	52.96	4	28,031	46.73	–	72	0.12	–	–	–	–	3,738	6.23	59,990	FL
Georgia	12	94,667	65.92	12	48,603	33.84	–	195	0.14	–	145	0.10	–	46,064	32.08	143,610	GA
Illinois	22	312,351	46.43	–	337,469	50.17	22	12,074	1.79	–	10,776	1.60	–	−25,118	−3.73	672,670	IL
Indiana	15	245,005	49.46	15	238,489	48.15	–	3,028	0.61	–	8,810	1.78	–	6,516	1.32	495,332	IN
Iowa	13	177,316	47.01	–	197,089	52.25	13	1,499	0.40	–	–	–	–	−19,773	−5.24	377,201	IA
Kansas	9	90,132	33.90	–	154,406	58.08	9	4,495	1.69	–	16,346	6.15	–	−64,274	−24.18	265,848	KS
Kentucky	13	152,961	55.32	13	118,690	42.93	–	3,139	1.14	–	1,691	0.61	–	34,271	12.40	276,481	KY
Louisiana	8	62,594	57.22	8	46,347	42.37	–	338	0.31	–	120	0.11	–	16,247	14.85	109,399	LA
Maine	6	52,153	39.97	–	72,217	55.34	6	2,160	1.66	–	3,955	3.03	–	−20,064	−15.38	130,491	ME
Maryland	8	96,866	52.07	8	85,748	46.10	–	2,827	1.52	–	578	0.31	–	11,118	5.98	186,019	MD
Massachusetts	14	122,352	40.33	–	146,724	48.36	14	9,923	3.27	–	24,382	8.04	–	−24,372	−8.03	303,383	MA
Michigan	13	189,361	47.20	–	192,669	48.02	13	18,403	4.59	–	753	0.19	–	−3,308	−0.82	401,186	MI
Minnesota	7	70,065	36.87	–	111,685	58.78	7	4,684	2.47	–	3,583	1.89	–	−41,620	−21.90	190,017	MN
Mississippi	9	77,653	64.34	9	43,035	35.66	–	–	–	–	–	–	–	34,618	28.68	120,688	MS
Missouri	16	236,023	53.49	16	203,081	46.02	–	2,164	0.49	–	–	–	–	32,942	7.47	441,268	MO
Nebraska	5	54,391	40.53	–	76,912	57.31	5	2,899	2.16	–	–	–	–	−22,521	−16.78	134,202	NE
Nevada	3	5,578	43.59	–	7,193	56.21	3	–	–	–	26	0.20	–	−1,615	−12.62	12,797	NV
New Hampshire	4	39,198	46.34	–	43,254	51.14	4	1,580	1.87	–	554	0.65	–	−4,056	−4.80	84,586	NH
New Jersey	9	127,798	48.98	9	123,440	47.31	–	6,159	2.36	–	3,496	1.34	–	4,358	1.67	260,921	NJ
New York	36	563,154	48.25	36	562,005	48.15	–	25,006	2.14	–	17,004	1.46	–	1,149	0.10	1,167,169	NY
North Carolina	11	142,905	53.25	11	125,021	46.59	–	430	0.16	–	–	–	–	17,884	6.66	268,356	NC
Ohio	23	368,280	46.94	–	400,082	50.99	23	11,069	1.41	–	5,179	0.66	–	−31,802	−4.05	784,610	OH
Oregon	3	24,604	46.70	–	26,860	50.99	3	492	0.93	–	726	1.38	–	−2,256	−4.28	52,682	OR
Pennsylvania	30	392,785	43.46	–	478,804	52.97	30	15,283	1.69	–	16,992	1.88	–	−86,019	−9.52	903,864	PA
Rhode Island	4	12,391	37.81	–	19,030	58.07	4	928	2.83	–	422	1.29	–	−6,639	−20.26	32,771	RI
South Carolina	9	69,845	75.25	9	21,730	23.41	–	–	–	–	–	–	–	48,115	51.84	92,812	SC
Tennessee	12	133,770	51.45	12	124,101	47.74	–	1,150	0.44	–	957	0.37	–	9,669	3.72	259,978	TN
Texas	13	225,309	69.26	13	93,141	28.63	–	3,534	1.09	–	3,321	1.02	–	132,168	40.63	325,305	TX
Vermont	4	17,331	29.18	–	39,514	66.52	4	1,753	2.95	–	785	1.32	–	−22,183	−37.34	59,401	VT
Virginia	12	145,491	51.05	12	139,356	48.90	–	130	0.05	–	–	–	–	6,135	2.15	284,977	VA
West Virginia	6	67,311	50.94	6	63,096	47.75	–	939	0.71	–	799	0.60	–	4,215	3.19	132,145	WV
Wisconsin	11	146,453	45.79	–	161,135	50.38	11	7,649	2.39	–	4,598	1.44	–	−14,682	−4.59	319,835	WI
TOTALS:	401	4,914,482	48.85	219	4,856,903	48.28	182	150,890	1.50	–	134,294	1.33	–	57,579	0.57	10,060,145	US

=== States that flipped from Democratic to Republican ===
- California
- Nevada

=== States that flipped from Republican to Democratic ===
- Connecticut
- Indiana
- New York

=== Close states ===
Margin of victory less than 1% (55 electoral votes):

1. New York, 0.10% (1,149 votes) (tipping point state)
2. Michigan, 0.82% (3,308 votes)
3. Connecticut, 0.94% (1,284 votes)

Margin of victory between 1% and 5% (117 electoral votes):

1. Indiana, 1.32% (6,516 votes)
2. New Jersey, 1.67% (4,358 votes)
3. Virginia, 2.15% (6,135 votes)
4. West Virginia, 3.19% (4,215 votes)
5. Tennessee, 3.72% (9,669 votes)
6. Illinois, 3.73% (25,118 votes)
7. Ohio, 4.05% (31,802 votes)
8. Oregon, 4.28% (2,256 votes)
9. Wisconsin, 4.59% (14,682 votes)
10. New Hampshire, 4.80% (4,056 votes)

Margin of victory between 5% and 10% (104 electoral votes):

1. Iowa, 5.24% (19,773 votes)
2. Maryland, 5.98% (11,118 votes)
3. Florida, 6.23% (3,738 votes)
4. California, 6.64% (13,081 votes)
5. North Carolina, 6.66% (17,884 votes)
6. Missouri, 7.47% (32,942 votes)
7. Massachusetts, 8.03% (24,372 votes)
8. Pennsylvania, 9.52% (86,019 votes)

== See also ==
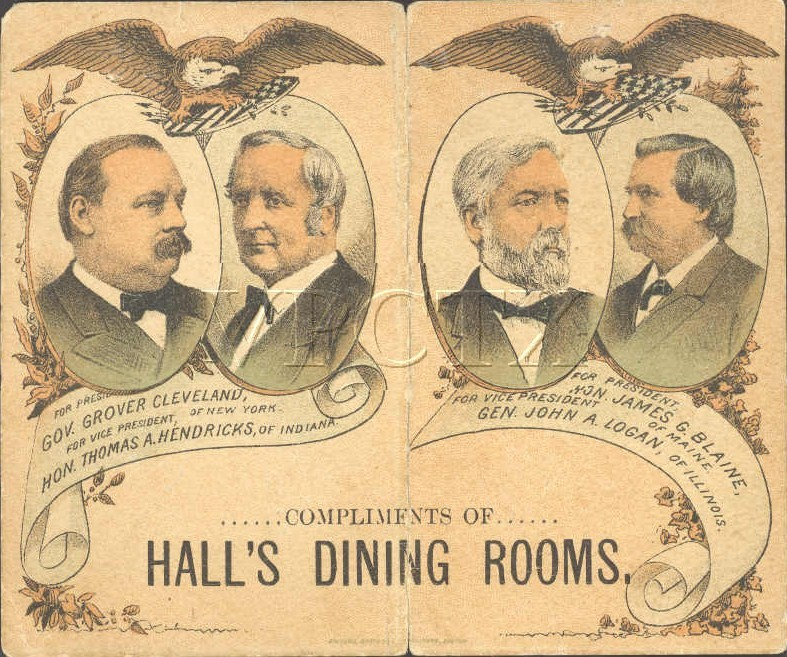
Dance card cover depicting the candidates

- American election campaigns in the 19th century
- History of the United States (1865–1918)
- First inauguration of Grover Cleveland
- 1884 United States House of Representatives elections
- 1884–1885 United States Senate elections
- President of the United States
- Third Party System

== Works cited ==
- Abramson, Paul; Aldrich, John; Rohde, David (1995). Change and Continuity in the 1992 Elections. CQ Press. ISBN 0871878399.
- Sherman, Richard (1973). The Republican Party and Black America From McKinley to Hoover 1896-1933. University of Virginia Press. ISBN 0813904676.

== Sources ==
- Davies, Gareth; Zelizer, Julian E, eds. (2015). America at the Ballot Box. doi:10.9783/9780812291360. ISBN 9780812291360.
- Hirsch, Mark. "Election of 1884", in History of Presidential Elections: Volume III 1848–1896, ed. Arthur Schlesinger and Fred Israel (1971), 3:1578.
- Josephson, Matthew (1938). The Politicos: 1865–1896.
- Keller, Morton (1977). Affairs of State: Public Life in Late Nineteenth Century America. doi:10.4159/harvard.9780674181885. ISBN 9780674181885.
- Kleppner, Paul (1979). The Third Electoral System 1853–1892: Parties, Voters, and Political Cultures.
- Lynch, G. Patrick (2002). "U.S. Presidential Elections in the Nineteenth Century: Why Culture and the Economy Both Mattered". Polity. 35: 29–50. doi:10.1086/POLv35n1ms3235469. S2CID 157740436.
- Norgren, Jill (2007). Belva Lockwood: The Woman Who Would be President. Archived from the original on June 4, 2011 – via Questia.
- Morgan, H. Wayne (1969). From Hayes to McKinley: National Party Politics, 1877–1896.
- James Ford Rhodes (1920). History of the United States from the Compromise of 1850 to the Roosevelt-Taft Administration (8 vols.).
- Summers, Mark Wahlgren. Rum, Romanism, and Rebellion: The Making of a President, 1884 (2000) online version
- "1884 Election Cleveland v. Blaine Overview", HarpWeek, July 26, 2008.
- Roberts, North (2004). Encyclopedia of Presidential Campaigns, Slogans, Issues, and Platforms.
- Thomas, Harrison Cook, The return of the Democratic Party to power in 1884 (1919) online

=== Primary sources ===
- The Republican Campaign Text Book for 1884. Republican Congressional Committee. 1882. "Democratic campaign text Book."
- Chester, Edward W A guide to political platforms (1977) online
- Porter, Kirk H. and Donald Bruce Johnson, eds. National party platforms, 1840-1964 (1965) online 1840-1956
