= Orlando Franklin Bump =

American lawyer (1841–1884)

Orlando Franklin Bump (February 28, 1841 – January 29, 1884) was an American lawyer and writer.

Bump, the second of four children of Samuel C. and Abby Ann Bump, was born on February 28, 1841, in Afton, Chenango County, New York. By his own exertions, he secured the means to attend Yale College, which he entered at the beginning of the Junior year and graduated 1863. His father had moved to Maryland some years before.

In the fall of 1863 he entered the law office of William Daniel of Baltimore, and in September 1865, he was admitted to the bar of that city, where he was engaged for the rest of his life in successful practice. From 1866 to 1869 he was also on the editorial staff of the Baltimore American. In June 1867, he was appointed Register in Bankruptcy, and as an early fruit of his studies published in 1868 a work on The Law and Practice of Bankruptcy, which became the leading textbook on that subject, and passed through ten editions in as many years. In 1870 he edited the U. S. Annotated Internal Revenue Laws, and in 1872 issued a valuable Treatise on Fraudulent Conveyances. He was also employed in 1872 to assist in the revision of the Statutes of the United States. In 1877 he published another valuable work on The Law of Patents, Trademarks and Copyright, and in 1878 Notes of Constitutional Decisions. He also annotated other legal authors, edited several volumes of the National Bankruptcy Register, and contributed to various professional journals. As an acknowledgment of his eminent ability as a writer Yale conferred on him the honorary degree of Master of Arts in 1876.

After a lingering illness (malarial fever) he was seized with brain fever, which caused his death, at his residence in Baltimore, January 29, 1884, in his 43rd year. He married, July 27, 1870, Sallie E. Weathers, who survived him with two of their three sons.
