= 1884 United States presidential election in Minnesota =

- November 4, 1884
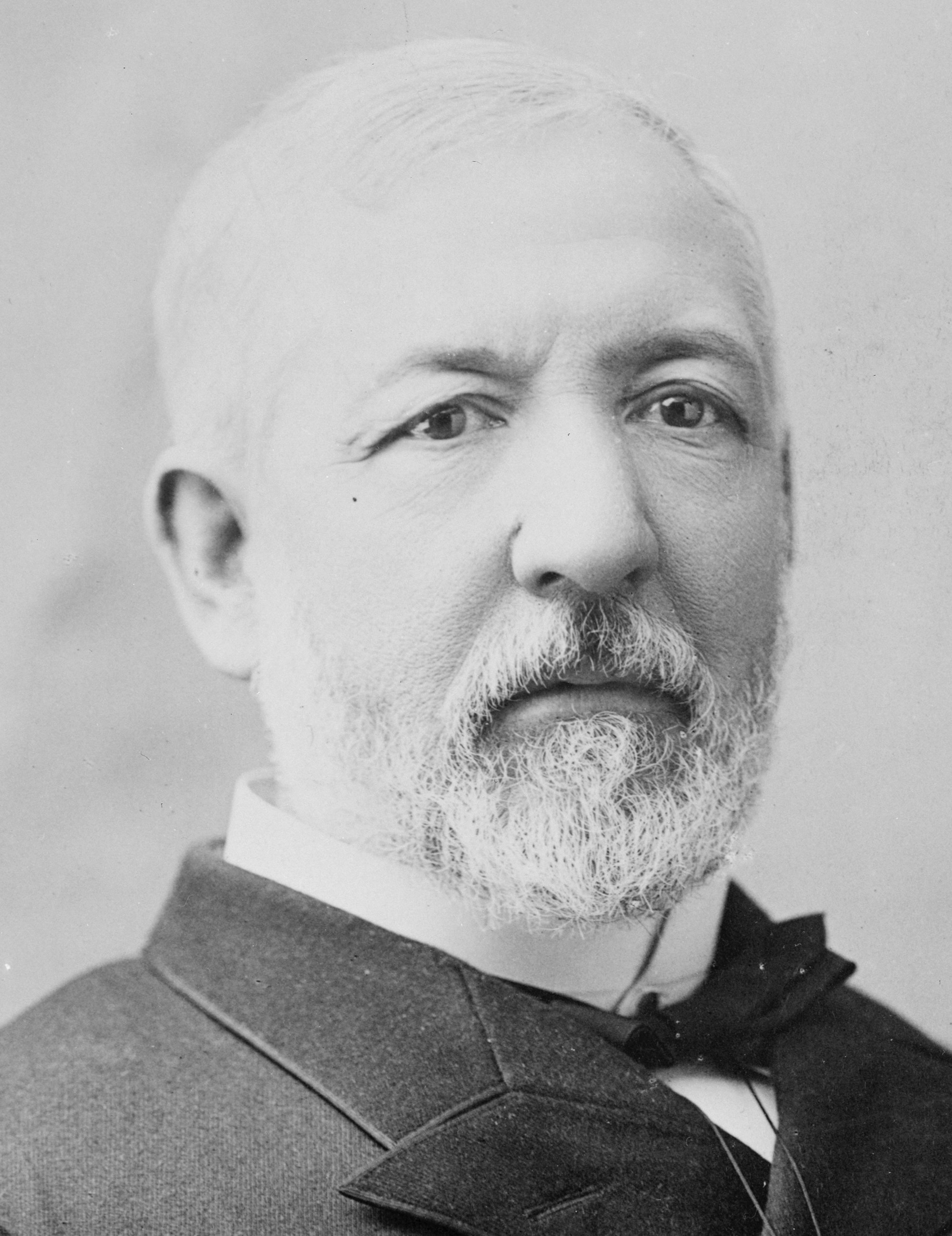

Nominee	James G. Blaine	Grover Cleveland
Party	Republican	Democratic
Home state	Maine	New York
Running mate	John A. Logan	Thomas A. Hendricks
Electoral vote	7	0
Popular vote	111,865	70,065
Percentage	58.78%	36.87%
County results
Blaine
50–60%
60–70%
70–80%
80–90%
90–100%
Cleveland
40–50%
50–60%
60–70%
70–80%
President before election
Chester A. Arthur
Republican
Elected President
Grover Cleveland
Democratic

The 1884 United States presidential election in Minnesota took place on November 4, 1884, as part of the 1884 United States presidential election. Voters chose seven representatives, or electors to the Electoral College, who voted for president and vice president.

Minnesota was won by Republican nominee, James G. Blaine, over the Democratic nominee, Grover Cleveland. Blaine won the state by a margin of 21.91%.

With 58.78% of the popular vote, Minnesota would prove to be Blaine's second strongest victory in terms of percentage in the popular vote after Vermont.

As of 2024, this remains the last time that a Republican presidential nominee would win a majority of the vote in Minnesota while losing nationally. This is also the first time since statehood that the state voted for the losing candidate.

== Results ==
1884 United States presidential election in Minnesota
Party	Candidate	Running mate	Popular vote		Electoral vote	
Party	Candidate	Running mate	Count	%	Count	%
Republican	James Gillespie Blaine of Maine	John Alexander Logan of Illinois	111,685	58.78%	7	100.00%
Democratic	Grover Cleveland of New York	Thomas Andrews Hendricks of Indiana	70,065	36.87%	0	0.00%
Prohibition	John Pierce St. John of Kansas	William Daniel of Maryland	4,684	2.47%	0	0.00%
Greenback	Benjamin Franklin Butler of Massachusetts	Absolom Madden West of Mississippi	3,583	1.89%	0	0.00%
Total			190,017	100.00%	7	100.00%

== See also ==
- United States presidential elections in Minnesota
