= Samuel D. Burchard (minister) =

American Presbyterian minister (1812–1891)

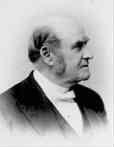
Samuel D. Burchard

Samuel Dickinson Burchard (September 6, 1812 – September 25, 1891) was a 19th-century American Presbyterian Church minister from New York.

== Biography ==
Born in Steuben, New York, Burchard moved to Kentucky with his parents in 1830, attended Centre College and graduated in 1837. He was licensed to preach in 1838. He was pastor of several Presbyterian churches in New York City. Burchard was chancellor of the Ingham University, and president of Rutgers female college. He died at Saratoga, New York.

In the 1884 United States presidential election, Burchard advocated for Republican candidate James G. Blaine, and attacked the Democrats as "the party of rum, Romanism, and rebellion". Several days before the election, Burchard infamously uttered this anti-Catholic epithet when speaking before Blaine at a New York City campaign event. The remark caused substantial controversy, as did the absence of any denouncement from Blaine; the candidate subsequently claimed he had not heard Burchard when he said it. It has been cited as a major factor in Blaine's narrow defeat, by driving Irish Catholic voters to Grover Cleveland in the decisive state of New York.

Burchard died in Saratoga, New York on September 25, 1891, aged 79.
