= 1884 United States presidential election in Vermont =

- November 4, 1884
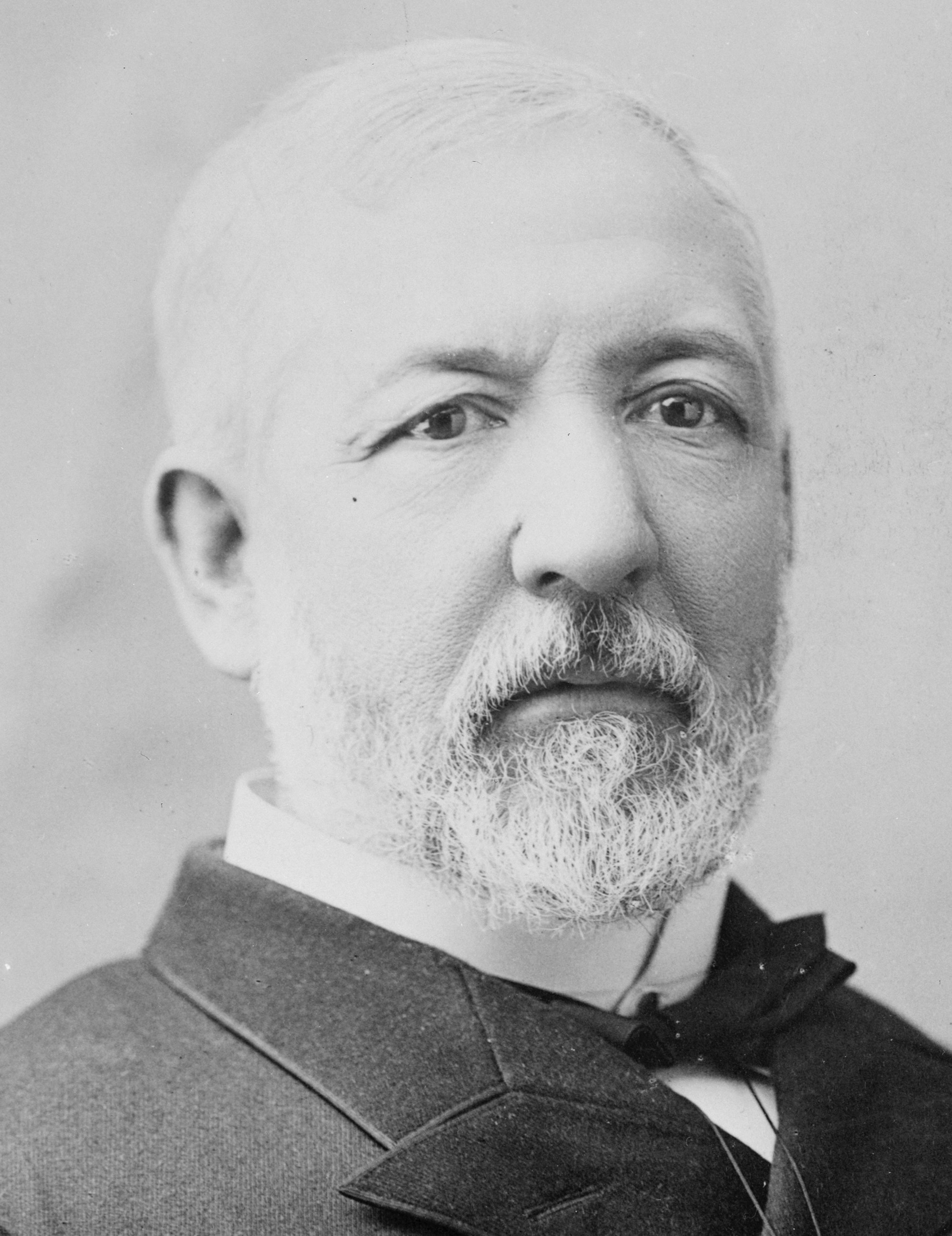

Nominee	James G. Blaine	Grover Cleveland
Party	Republican	Democratic
Home state	Maine	New York
Running mate	John A. Logan	Thomas A. Hendricks
Electoral vote	4	0
Popular vote	39,514	17,331
Percentage	66.52%	29.18%

Blaine
40–50%
50–60%
60–70%
70–80%
80–90%
90–100%
Cleveland
40–50%
50–60%
60–70%
Tie
50%
President before election
Chester A. Arthur
Republican
Elected President
Grover Cleveland
Democratic

The 1884 United States presidential election in Vermont took place on November 4, 1884, as part of the 1884 United States presidential election. Voters chose four representatives, or electors to the Electoral College, who voted for president and vice president.

Vermont voted for the Republican nominee, James G. Blaine, over the Democratic nominee, Grover Cleveland. Blaine won Vermont by a margin of 37.34%.

With 66.52% of the popular vote, Vermont would be Blaine's strongest victory in terms of percentage in the popular vote.

== Results ==
1884 United States presidential election in Vermont
Party	Candidate	Running mate	Popular vote		Electoral vote	
Party	Candidate	Running mate	Count	%	Count	%
Republican	James Gillespie Blaine of Maine	John Alexander Logan of Illinois	39,514	66.52%	4	100.00%
Democratic	Grover Cleveland of New York	Thomas Andrews Hendricks of Indiana	17,331	29.18%	0	0.00%
Prohibition	John Pierce St. John of Kansas	William Daniel of Maryland	1,753	2.95%	0	0.00%
Greenback	Benjamin Franklin Butler of Massachusetts	Absolom Madden West of Mississippi	785	1.32%	0	0.00%
N/A	Others	Others	18	0.03%	0	0.00%
Total			59,401	100.00%	4	100.00%

=== Results by county ===
County	James Gillespie Blaine Republican		Stephen Grover Cleveland Democratic		Various candidates Other parties		Margin		Total votes cast
County	#	%	#	%	#	%	#	%	Total votes cast
Addison	3,478	81.22%	600	14.01%	204	4.76%	2,878	67.21%	4,282
Bennington	2,335	62.58%	1,366	36.61%	30	0.80%	969	25.97%	3,731
Caledonia	2,631	61.92%	1,314	30.92%	304	7.15%	1,317	31.00%	4,249
Chittenden	3,629	64.57%	1,875	33.36%	116	2.06%	1,754	31.21%	5,620
Essex	898	61.46%	500	34.22%	63	4.31%	398	27.24%	1,461
Franklin	2,619	59.73%	1,396	31.84%	370	8.44%	1,223	27.89%	4,385
Grand Isle	407	62.81%	207	31.94%	34	5.25%	200	30.86%	648
Lamoille	1,567	64.35%	631	25.91%	237	9.73%	936	38.44%	2,435
Orange	2,351	60.50%	1,392	35.82%	143	3.68%	959	24.68%	3,886
Orleans	2,476	75.03%	681	20.64%	143	4.33%	1,795	54.39%	3,300
Rutland	5,096	66.68%	2,253	29.48%	294	3.85%	2,843	37.20%	7,643
Washington	3,129	60.00%	1,812	34.75%	274	5.25%	1,317	25.25%	5,215
Windham	3,788	67.13%	1,703	30.18%	152	2.69%	2,085	36.95%	5,643
Windsor	5,110	74.23%	1,601	23.26%	173	2.51%	3,509	50.97%	6,884
Totals	39,514	66.54%	17,331	29.19%	2,537	4.27%	22,183	37.36%	59,382

== See also ==
- United States presidential elections in Vermont
