= William Daniel (Maryland politician) =

American politician (1826–1897)

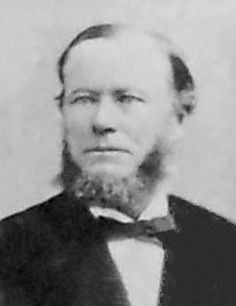

Personal details
- Born: January 24, 1826 Deal Island, Maryland, U.S.
- Died: October 13, 1897 (aged 71) Baltimore, Maryland, U.S.
- Resting place: Green Mount Cemetery
- Party: Whig (Before 1854); Know Nothing (1854–1864); Republican (1864–1884); Prohibition (1884–1897)
- Education: Dickinson College (BA)

William Daniel (January 24, 1826 – October 13, 1897) was an American politician from the state of Maryland. A lawyer, he was a noted prohibitionist and abolitionist. He served in both houses of the Maryland state legislature, first as a Whig, and later as a member of the American Party. Later, as a Republican, he was a member of the convention that wrote Maryland's constitution in 1864. He helped found the Maryland Temperance Alliance in 1872 and served as its president for twelve years. Daniel was the vice presidential nominee and running mate of John St. John on the Prohibition Party ticket in the presidential election of 1884. Placing third in the election that year, he continued his involvement with the cause of temperance until his death in 1897.

== Early life and education ==
Daniel was born on Deal Island in Somerset County, Maryland, on January 24, 1826, the son of Travers Daniel and his wife, Mary Wallace Daniel. Travers Daniel arrived at Deal Island at the age of eighteen to teach school but soon turned to farming after marrying Mary Wallace. William Daniel and his siblings were raised on the farm and attended the local school. He attended Dickinson College in Carlisle, Pennsylvania, graduating in 1848. While in college, he became a member of the Methodist Episcopal Church; he would remain affiliated with the church for the rest of his life. After finishing third in a class of twenty-eight, Daniel returned to Maryland to study law in the office of William S. Waters, a Somerset County lawyer who had recently served as Speaker of the Maryland House of Delegates. Daniel was admitted to the bar in 1851.

== State legislator ==
Like the rest of his family, Daniel was a member of the Whig Party, and soon became involved in local politics. While maintaining his law practice, he was elected to a two-year term in the Maryland House of Delegates in 1853. While there he introduced a bill based on the Maine law, which would have prohibited the sale and production of alcoholic beverages in the state, but it did not pass. By this time, the Whig Party was falling apart over sectional issues, but Daniel was reelected in 1855 as a member of the American Party (also known as the "Know Nothings").

The Know Nothings' main political issue was nativism, but Daniel remained focused more on prohibition. In 1857, he promoted a law permitting the local option, which would let individual counties in the state choose whether to enact prohibition of alcohol within their borders, but it did not pass. That year he was elected to a four-year term in the Maryland Senate. He resigned part-way through his term, in 1858, to practice law in Baltimore. Two years later, he married Ellen Young Guiteau, daughter of a Congregational minister. By 1864, Daniel had joined the Republican Party. That year, he was a delegate to the state's constitutional convention, which produced the Maryland Constitution of 1864.

Despite growing up in a slaveholding area, Daniel was an abolitionist and joined with the majority at the convention in voting to outlaw slavery and disenfranchise those who had fought for the Confederacy in the Civil War. In 1866, Daniel argued in court that state laws enforcing racial distinctions were no longer valid after the passage of the recent federal Civil Rights Act. The court ruled in his favor, holding that the law could not treat black and white apprentices differently. Later that year, Daniel ran unsuccessfully for a judgeship on the state equity court.

== Prohibition advocate ==
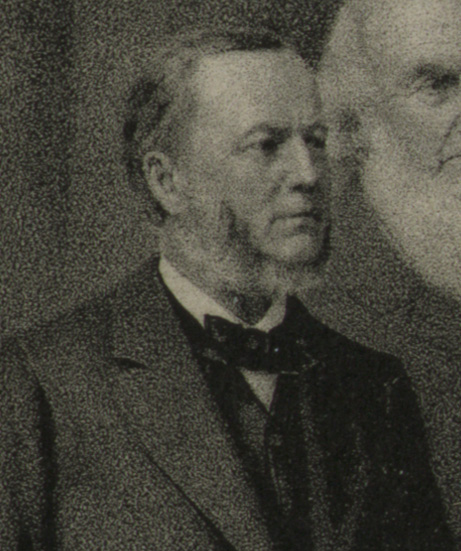
Daniel pictured in 1884

After the war, Daniel continued in his private law practice while remaining active in the anti-alcohol cause. He was elected president of the Maryland Temperance Alliance when it was formed in 1872. He was re-elected to that position annually for the next twelve years. During that time, the local option law Daniel favored while in the legislature became law; thirteen of the state's twenty-three counties (including Somerset) adopted prohibition under the statute. Throughout his leadership of the Maryland Temperance Alliance, Daniel remained a member of the Republican Party, but in 1884 he left to join the small Prohibition Party.

Like Daniel, most party members came from pietist churches, and most were former Republicans. Elected as the head of the Maryland branch of the party, he attended the 1884 Prohibition Party National Convention in Pittsburgh. After being selected as temporary chairman of the convention, the delegates chose Daniel to be nominated for vice president alongside the presidential nominee, John St. John. The party platform was silent on most issues of the day, focusing instead on the alcohol problem. In the election that year, the Prohibition ticket fell far short of victory, as expected, but placed third with 1.5 percent of the vote—a marked improvement over the 0.1 percent the 1880 Prohibition candidates had received. Further, their vote total in New York—just over 25,000—was more than enough to throw the election in that state from James G. Blaine, the Republican, to Grover Cleveland, the Democrat. Because pro-temperance voters usually voted Republican, many historians credit St. John and Daniel with costing Blaine the election.

After the campaign, Daniel continued his temperance activism, remaining head of the state party until 1888. He organized the Prohibition Camp Meeting association in 1889, which later purchased land in Glyndon, Maryland for their meetings. He also kept up his law practice, training many law students in his office, including Orlando Franklin Bump, who served as Daniel's law partner for several years. He also served as a trustee of Dickinson College, his alma mater, and in other charitable and religious activities, including the YMCA. On October 13, 1897, he died suddenly of heart failure at his home in Mount Washington, Baltimore, survived by his wife and their adopted son, Clarence Adreon. He was buried at Green Mount Cemetery in Baltimore.

== Sources ==
- The Cyclopaedia of Temperance and Prohibition. New York, New York: Funk & Wagnalls. 1897. OCLC 15552482.
- Dickinson College Archives (2005). "William Daniel (1826–1897)". Dickinson College Archives & Special Collections.
- Frederikson, Edna Tutt (1935). "John Pierce St. John". Dictionary of American Biography. Vol. XVI. New York, New York: C. Scribner's Sons. pp. 303–304.
- Fuke, Richard Paul (1999). Imperfect Equality: African Americans and the Confines of White Racial Attitudes in Post-Emancipation Maryland. New York, New York: Fordham University Press. ISBN 0-8232-1962-3.
- "Funeral of William Daniel". Baltimore Sun. October 16, 1897. p. 7 – via Newspapers.com.
- Kleppner, Paul (1979). The Third Electoral System, 1853–1892: Parties, Voters, and Political Cultures. Chapel Hill, North Carolina: University of North Carolina Press. ISBN 0-8078-1328-1.
- Pocock, Emil (April 1973). "Wet or Dry? The Presidential Election of 1884 In Upstate New York". New York History. 54 (2): 174–190. JSTOR 23170001.
- Portrait and Biographical Record of the Eastern Shore. New York, New York: Chapman Publishing Co. 1898. OCLC 45271164.
- "Prohibition Party Candidates". The American Reformer. Vol. II, no. 16. New York, New York: The American Reformer Publishing Co. August 2, 1884. p. 243.
- "William Daniel Dead". Baltimore Sun. October 14, 1897. p. 7 – via Newspapers.com.

Party political offices
Preceded by Henry Adams Thompson	Prohibition nominee for Vice President of the United States; 1884	Succeeded by John A. Brooks
