= Union Party (Kansas) =

- Founded: 1862; 163 years ago
- Dissolved: 1865; 160 years ago
- Ideology: Unionism; Anti-Lane

The Union Party was a political party in Kansas during the American Civil War. It was the opposition to the Kansas Republican Party in its period of activity. The party was organized by War Democrats and Republican opponents of Jim Lane to counteract the latter's influence over federal patronage and the direction of the Union war effort. It was not an affiliate of the National Union Party, which Democrats and Radical Republicans in the party opposed. The party divided during the 1864 presidential campaign, with different elements supportive of the candidacies of Abraham Lincoln, George B. McClellan, and Salmon Chase, respectively. The end of the war and the subsequent events of presidential Reconstruction precipitated another political realignment in which Lane and other allies of Lincoln's successor, Andrew Johnson, joined forces with Democrats in the National Union Party, while anti-Lane Radical Republicans rejoined the Republican Party.

== Background ==
The Democratic Party was anathema in Kansas following the bloody guerrilla warfare of the territorial period, as Jayhawkers associated the national party with proslavery Border Ruffians and the hated Pierce and Buchanan administrations. In the 1859 Kansas gubernatorial election, the Republican Charles L. Robinson defeated the Democratic outgoing territorial governor Samuel Medary with 59 percent of the vote. Robinson's inauguration was delayed by a lengthy congressional battle over the proposed Wyandotte Constitution, ending in the admission of Kansas as the 34th state on January 29, 1861. By this time, seven secessionist slave states had formed the Confederate States of America in response to the Republican victory in the 1860 United States presidential election, precipitating a crisis which would culminate in open hostilities between the Confederacy and the United States in April 1861.

Robinson's administration oversaw the early involvement of Kansas in the American Civil War. During this period, the Kansas Legislature elected James "Jim" Lane to one of two open seats in the United States Senate. (The second Kansan seat went to Samuel C. Pomeroy.) The battle between Lane and Robinson for control of the Republican Party split the organization and culminated in an unsuccessful attempt by Lane to have Robinson impeached and removed from office. With Lane's partisans in control of the state party, anti-Lane Republicans looked to an alliance with the exiled Democrats ahead of the 1862 state elections.

== History ==
=== Creation (1862) ===
The Kansas Republican Party met in convention at Topeka from September 17–18 and nominated Thomas Carney for governor, passing over the incumbent Robinson. Carney's nomination was seen as a victory for the Lane faction, who controlled the convention. On September 29, a meeting of War Democrats and anti-Lane Republicans calling themselves the Union State Convention gathered at Lawrence, Kansas and nominated a statewide ticket, with Marcus J. Parrott for Congress and William R. Wagstaff for governor. The convention announced "the condition of our country and State imperatively demands that all good and loyal citizens should, without distinction of party, unite in supporting the National Government in its efforts to crush the Rebellion," and that "while there are among us differences of opinion upon minor questions of policy in the prosecution of the war, we are all agreed that the measures adopted should be those which will bear with the most crushing effect upon the Rebellion." They accused the Lane faction of fostering partisanship and dividing the public in a time of war and of using "open pecuniary bribery" to cement their grip on political power. The platform took no position on slavery or the Emancipation Proclamation, which Lincoln had issued the week preceding.

Parrott's nomination proved a liability for the Union Party when the candidate mocked the threat from Confederate guerrillas in an appearance with Lane at Leavenworth, Kansas. Republicans used the remarks to portray the Union ticket as inept and potentially treasonous malcontents and a front for the hated Democratic Party. One such typical editorial ridiculed the "Union Ass Convention" as an unwieldy conglomeration of "pro-slavery Democrats, of the old Border-Ruffian stripe, [...] who laugh at every Union defeat and get drunk for joy at every Rebel victory," and "sour-stomached and dissatisfied Republicans and Abolitionists, who think their plan is the only one that can save the country." Overwhelmed by attacks from their opponents and the press, weighted down by Robinson's unpopular administration, Wagstaff carried just two counties and 35% of the vote in the gubernatorial race, while Parrott was handily defeated by A. Carter Wilder in the concurrent congressional election.

=== Opportunity and defeat (1863–64) ===
Prospects for the Union Party seemed bright as the 1864 state elections drew close. Lane's popularity was at a low ebb following the Lawrence Massacre, for which his previous sack of Osceola, Missouri was partly blamed. In February 1864, the legislature elected Carney—since fallen out with Lane—to succeed Lane in the Senate, although Lane's term would not end for another year. Meanwhile, the national Lincoln administration, with which Lane was politically aligned, faced growing internal opposition in the form of Salmon P. Chase's presidential candidacy. Radical Republicans in the Union Party hoped Chase's election would give them access to federal patronage denied by Lincoln and yield a more aggressing prosecution of the sagging war effort.

Chase's candidacy, however, floundered, and there remained no serious hope of his nomination when the Union State Convention met at Topeka on September 13, 1864. By this time, Lincoln had already been nominated by the Baltimore convention of the National Union Party, a coalition of Lincoln's Republican, War Democrat, and Unionist supporters. At the Topeka convention, the Kansas War Democrats and anti-Lane Republicans met separately to nominate electors for the presidential election before convening in joint session to select candidates for state offices. The War Democrats nominated electors pledged in support of the national Democratic ticket of McClellan and George H. Pendleton, while the Republican gathering after some debate voted to endorse Lincoln. A breakaway group of Radical Republicans called for Lincoln to withdraw from the race and named Robinson and Pomeroy delegates to attend a proposed second national convention in Cincinnati to choose a new Republican candidate. The withdrawal of the Radical Democratic ticket a week later ended any realistic hope of replacing Lincoln as the Union Republican candidate for president.

Meanwhile, Lane's adroit response to Sterling Price's raid through Missouri in September 1864 revived his popularity and placed his rivals again on the defensive. In the gubernatorial election, the Republican candidate Samuel J. Crawford, who had served under Lane in the Missouri expedition, easily defeated the Union candidate Solon O. Thacher. In the concurrent presidential race, Lincoln—now opposed only by the Democrat McClellan—easily carried Kansas's three electoral votes, with all three electors on the Lane ticket defeating both the rival anti-Lane Republican candidate, Parrott, and the three Democratic electors.

== Aftermath ==
Crawford was re-elected governor in 1866, this time defeating a challenger from the National Union Party. This party was not a continuation of the Union Party that formed in 1862, but a distinct political movement built upon the foundations of the National Union coalition that supported Lincoln's successful bid for re-election in 1864. Following Lincoln's assassination in April 1865, Johnson, his successor, laid claim to the National Union Party and attempted to remake it as a vehicle for his own political ambitions. In Kansas, Lane and other Republicans aligned with Johnson joined Democrats in the National Union Party and contested the 1866 elections under its banner. Lane's association with the hated Johnson marked the end of his political career, and he committed suicide in 1866. Crawford appointed Edmund G. Ross, a Union Army veteran with no political experience, to succeed Lane in the Senate. The appointment helped to reconcile many former anti-Lane Radical Republicans with the Kansas Republican Party, while most of what remained of the now-leaderless Lane faction reluctantly fell in line behind Crawford.

Some anti-Lane Republicans who had joined the Union Party in 1862 continued to affiliate with the opposition after the end of the war, including Robinson, who was elected to the Kansas Senate by the Independent Reform Party, serving from 1873 to 1881. He subsequently joined the Greenback Party and was their candidate for governor in 1882. Robinson made his final bid for the governorship as a Democrat in 1890, finishing third behind the victorious Republicans and the candidate of the People's Party.
