= 1864 Kansas gubernatorial election =

- November 8, 1864
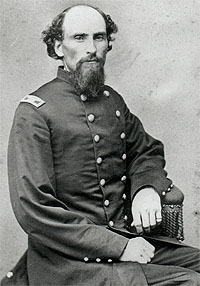

Nominee	Samuel J. Crawford	Solon O. Thacher
Party	Republican	Union
Popular vote	13,387	8,448
Percentage	61.31%	38.69%
- County results Crawford: 50–60% 60–70% 70–80% 80–90% Thacher: 50–60% 60–70% >90% No Data
Governor before election
Thomas Carney
Republican
Elected Governor
Samuel J. Crawford
Republican

A gubernatorial election was held in Kansas on November 8, 1864. The Republican colonel of the 2nd Kansas Colored Infantry Regiment Samuel J. Crawford defeated the Union judge of the U.S. district court for the District of Kansas Solon O. Thacher.

The Union Party was organized in 1862 by opponents of U.S. Senator Jim Lane to contest the 1862 state elections. In 1864 the party was divided between supporters of Abraham Lincoln, George B. McClellan, and John C. Fremont in the upcoming presidential election. When the Union State Convention convened at Topeka on September 13, Democratic and Anti-Lane Republicans met separately to nominate presidential tickets in support of McClellan and Lincoln, respectively; the two groups then reconvened in a joint session and nominated a single statewide ticket with Thacher as the gubernatorial candidate. Some Radical Republicans in the Union Party were dissatisfied with Lincoln and initially refused to support the Union presidential ticket; these individuals appointed delegates to attend the national convention of the Radical Democratic Party in Cincinnati in hopes of replacing Lincoln with a more acceptable candidate.

== Results ==
Kansas gubernatorial election, 1864
Party	Candidate	Votes	%
Republican	Samuel J. Crawford	13,387	61.31
Union	Solon O. Thacher	8,448	38.69
Total votes		21,835	100.00
Republican hold			
