= John St. John (American politician) =

American politician (1833 – 1916)

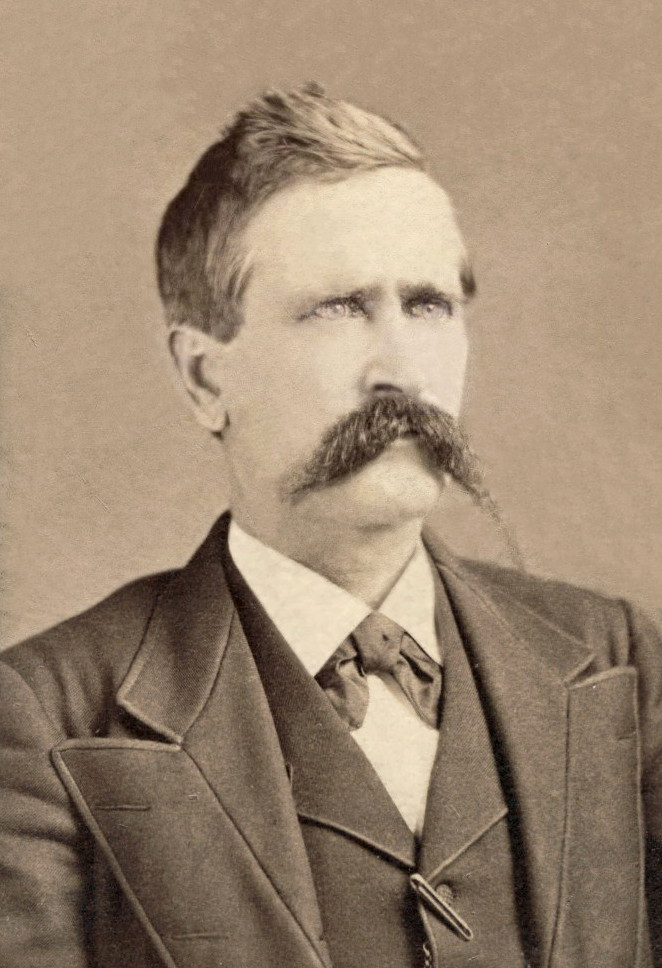

8th Governor of Kansas
- In office January 13, 1879 – January 8, 1883
- Lieutenant: Lyman U. Humphrey; David Wesley Finney
- Preceded by: George T. Anthony
- Succeeded by: George Glick

Member of the Kansas Senate from the 9th District
- In office 1873–1874

Personal details
- Born: John Pierce St. John; February 25, 1833 Brookville, Indiana, U.S.
- Died: August 31, 1916 (aged 83) Olathe, Kansas, U.S.
- Party: Republican(Before 1884)
- Other political affiliations: Prohibition (1884-1896, after 1896); Populist (1896)
- Spouse(s): Mary Jane Brewer; Susan Parker
- Children: 3
- Parents: Samuel St. John (father); Sophia Snell (mother)

Military service
- Allegiance: United States
- Branch/service: Union Army
- Years of service: 1853-1854; 1861-1864
- Rank: Lieutenant colonel
- Unit: 143rd Illinois Volunteer Infantry Regiment
- Battles/wars: American Indian Wars; American Civil War

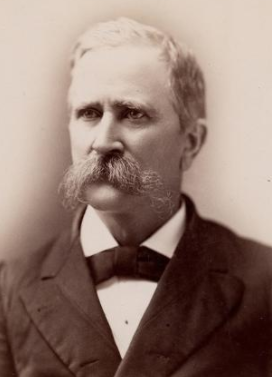
John St. John

John Pierce St. John (February 25, 1833 – August 31, 1916) was an American politician who served as the eighth governor of Kansas. A Republican, St. John was a staunch supporter of Prohibition and later served as the Prohibition Party's nominee in the 1884 presidential election. Under his tenure as governor, Kansas became the third state to enact a statewide prohibition of alcohol which would last until 1948 and remain in some form until 1987. After leaving elected office he maintained his position in the Prohibition Party and remained active in the party's presidential politics and was a major figure in the party schism during the 1896 presidential election.

== Early life ==
On February 25, 1833, John Pierce St. John was born in Brookville, Indiana, to Samuel St. John and Sophia Snell. In 1852, he became the conductor of an ox team which he led to California. During his time in California he fought against the Modoc Native Americans in California and Oregon. John was a congregationalist until the 1870s when he converted and became a Christian Scientist. From 1852 to 1859, he was married to Mary Jane Brewer and had one son until their divorce. On March 28, 1860, he married Susan J. Parker and later had two children with her.

== Career ==
During the American Civil War he served as lieutenant colonel of the 143rd Illinois Volunteer Infantry Regiment in the Union Army from 1861 to 1864. At the end of the war he lived in Independence, Missouri until 1869 when he moved to Olathe, Kansas. From 1873 to 1874 he served in the Kansas Senate and was the Republican governor of Kansas from 1879 to 1883.

He was the first governor of Kansas to have a formal inauguration ceremony. He was active in the temperance movement and successfully promoted a prohibition amendment to the state's constitution in 1881. St. John also helped create the Kansas Freedmen's Relief Association during the Great Exodus of African-Americans to Kansas in 1879. In 1879, the religious colony of Zion Valley was renamed to St. John in his honor to gain favor in winning the county seat of Stafford County. In 1882, he ran for reelection to a third term, but was defeated by George Washington Glick with 83,232 votes to 75,158 votes.

=== Presidential ===
He was the Prohibition Party candidate for President of the United States in the 1884 election. On October 2, 1884, he was nearly shot, with the bullet hitting the window next to him. He received 147,482 votes for 1.5% of the popular vote on a ticket with William Daniel which was an increase of 137,118 votes from Neal Dow's results in 1880 due to support from Frances Willard and the Woman's Christian Temperance Union. He was blamed for James G. Blaine's defeat and on November 27, 1884, an effigy of him was burned in Topeka, Kansas in front of a crowd of three thousand people.

He was made chairman of the 1888 Prohibition national convention and oversaw the writing of the party's platform. He declined to seek the Prohibition Party's presidential nomination for the 1892 presidential election and instead nominated John Bidwell who went on to win the nomination and was named as the temporary chairman of the convention. At the 1896 Prohibition convention he supported the "broad gauger" faction that wanted to add women's suffrage and free silver to the party's platform, but after the "narrow gauger" faction defeated those attempts John, Charles Eugene Bentley, and Helen M. Gougar led a walkout of the broad gaugers and created the breakaway National Party and nominated a rival ticket with Bentley as president and James H. Southgate as vice president. Following the 1896 election he became disillusioned with party and joined the People's Party although he would later return to the Prohibition party.

== Later life ==
On December 3, 1887, he, with a group of followers, bought 10,000 acres of land in Newhall, California, to create a dry community. In 1912, he toured Kansas in support of women's suffrage. On June 20, 1916, he suffered from heat exhaustion, but was able to recover enough to attend the 1916 Prohibition national convention in July. St. John died after suffering heat exhaustion on August 31, 1916, in Olathe, Kansas. His funeral was attended by Governor Arthur Capper, former governor George H. Hodges, and Herman P. Faris who served as the Prohibition Party's representative.

== Electoral history ==
John St. John electoral history

1873 Kansas Ninth Senate District election
Party	Candidate	Votes	%
Republican	John St. John	1,772	58.73%
Democratic	L. F. Green	1,245	41.27%
Total votes		3,017	100.00%

1878 Kansas gubernatorial election
Party	Candidate	Votes	%	±%
Republican	John St. John	74,020	53.52%	−3.26%
Democratic	John R. Goodin	37,208	26.91%	−11.01%
Greenback	David P. Mitchell	27,057	19.57%	+19.57%
N/A	Other	11	0.01%	−0.34%
Total votes		138,296	100.00%	

1880 Kansas gubernatorial election
Party	Candidate	Votes	%	±%
Republican	John St. John	115,144	57.90%	+4.38%
Democratic	Edmund G. Ross	63,557	31.96%	+5.05%
Greenback	H. P. Vrooman	19,481	9.80%	−9.77%
Prohibition	J. P. Culver	435	0.22%	+0.22%
Independent	F. M. Stringfield	210	0.11%	+0.11%
N/A	Other	57	0.03%	+0.02%
Total votes		198,884	100.00%	

1882 Kansas gubernatorial election
Party	Candidate	Votes	%	±%
Democratic	George Washington Glick	83,232	46.40%	+14.44%
Republican	John St. John	75,158	41.90%	−16.00%
Greenback	Charles L. Robinson	20,933	11.67%	+1.87%
N/A	Other	56	0.03%	±0.00%
Total votes		179,379	100.00%	

== See also ==
- Temperance organizations

Party political offices
Preceded by George T. Anthony	Republican nominee for Governor of Kansas; 1878, 1880, 1882	Succeeded by John Martin
Preceded by Neal Dow	Prohibition nominee for President of the United States; 1884	Succeeded by Clinton B. Fisk
Political offices
Preceded by George T. Anthony	Governor of Kansas; 1879–1883	Succeeded by George Glick
