= 1862 Kansas gubernatorial election =

- November 4, 1862
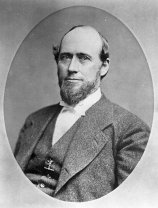

Nominee	Thomas Carney	William Ross Wagstaff
Party	Republican	Union
Popular vote	10,090	5,463
Percentage	64.87%	35.13%
- County results Carney: 50–60% 60–70% 70–80% 80–90% >90% Wagstaff: 50–60% 70–80% No Data
Governor before election
Charles L. Robinson
Republican
Elected Governor
Thomas Carney
Republican

A gubernatorial election was held in Kansas on November 4, 1862. The Republican state representative Thomas Carney defeated the Union state representative William R. Wagstaff.

The Kansas Republican Party nominated Carney in their state convention held at Topeka from September 17–18, 1862. Carney was an ally of the senior U.S. senator from Kansas and brigadier general Jim Lane, who by 1862 had emerged as the leader of the state Republican Party. Republican opponents of Lane and Carney joined Democrats to organize the Union Party, which held its convention at Lawrence, Kansas on September 29. Lane's favor with the national Lincoln administration gave him access to federal patronage with which to bolster the Kansas Republican Party, while the Union Party included Radical Republicans and Democrats critical of the president's wartime policies.

== Conventions ==
=== Republican Party nomination ===
Gubernatorial Ballot
Candidate	1st
Thomas Carney	42
George W. Collamore	22
William A. Phillips	9

=== Union Party nomination ===
Gubernatorial Ballot
Candidate	1st
William R. Wagstaff	Acclamation

== Results ==
Kansas gubernatorial election, 1862
Party	Candidate	Votes	%
Republican	Thomas Carney	10,090	64.87
Union	William Ross Wagstaff	5,456	35.13
Total votes		15,546	100.00
Republican hold			
