= Senator Thacher =

Senator Thacher may refer to:

- John Boyd Thacher (1847–1909), New York State Senate
- Solon O. Thacher (1830–1895), Kansas State Senate

== See also ==
- Senator Thatcher (disambiguation)
