= George Washington Glick =

American politician

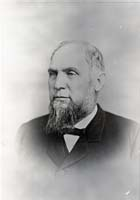

9th Governor of Kansas
- In office January 8, 1883 – January 12, 1885
- Lieutenant: David W. Finney
- Preceded by: John St. John
- Succeeded by: John A. Martin

Member of the Kansas State Legislature
- In office 1862, 1864-1869

Personal details
- Born: July 4, 1827 Fairfield County, Ohio, US
- Died: April 13, 1911 (aged 83) Atchison, Kansas, US
- Party: Democratic
- Spouse: Elizabeth Rider
- Profession: Attorney, politician

George Washington Glick (July 4, 1827 – April 13, 1911) was the ninth governor of Kansas.

George Washington Glick was raised on his father's farm near Greencastle, Ohio. He enlisted for service in the Mexican–American War, but saw no action. At age 21 he began studying to become an attorney at the law offices of Buckland and Hayes (later President Rutherford B. Hayes); he was admitted to the bar two years later and established a moderate law practice, earning a reputation as a hard-working lawyer. Glick moved to Atchison, Kansas, in 1859 and formed a partnership with Alfred G. Otis. He served as a Union soldier in the 2nd Kansas Infantry during the Civil War. Elected to the Kansas State Legislature in 1862, he served for 14 of the next 18 years and was Speaker pro tempore in 1876. He served in both houses of the state legislature. Glick was well respected and considered "just and expert" by his colleagues.

He was elected Governor in 1882 and served until 1885. He was also, despite being the 9th governor overall, only the first Democrat to serve as governor of Kansas. Legislation enacted during his tenure included the creation of a railroad commission, a "good roads" law, reassessment of tax laws, and the establishment of a livestock sanitary commission. He was later appointed pension agent in Topeka by President Grover Cleveland.

After 15 years of civic service, George Glick was forced to abandon his political career because of a throat infection that nearly destroyed his ability to speak. He continued, however, as an attorney for various railroads. He also managed his farm and served as a charter member and first vice president of the Kansas Historical Society.

In 1900, he was nominated to run for the US Congress against Charles Curtis. Curtis, a very popular figure who had just authored the Gold Standard Act, won.

Glick died in 1911 in Atchison, Kansas, he is buried in Mount Vernon Cemetery.

== Statue replacement ==
In 1914, the state of Kansas donated a marble statue of Glick to the U.S. Capitol's National Statuary Hall Collection as one of its two allowed entries. The statue was sculpted by Charles Niehaus, who sculpted seven other statues for the collection, including Kansas's other entry, Senator John J. Ingalls in 1905. In 2003, Kansas became the first state to replace a statue when it replaced Glick with a bronze of former president Dwight D. Eisenhower. Glick's statue was moved to the Kansas History Center in Topeka.

In 2024, the statue was moved to the Atchison County Historical Museum.

== Notes ==
Party political offices
Vacant Title last held by Samuel Medary	Democratic nominee for Governor of Kansas; 1868	Succeeded by Isaac Sharp
Preceded by Edmund G. Ross	Democratic nominee for Governor of Kansas; 1882, 1884	Succeeded by Thomas Moonlight
Political offices
Preceded by John P. St. John	Governor of Kansas; 1883–1885	Succeeded by John Martin
