= Charles Branscomb =

Kansas Territorial representative

Member of the Missouri House of Representatives
- In office 1867–1869

United States consul to England
- In office 1869–1874

Personal details
- Born: June 16, 1822 Newmarket, New Hampshire
- Died: January 3, 1891 (aged 68) Denver, Colorado
- Party: Republican; Prohibition
- Spouse(s): Georgia Hubbard Branscomb (first); Emily Taylor Branscomb (second)
- Education: Dartmouth College (B.A.); Cambridge Law School (J.D.)

Charles Henry Branscomb (June 16, 1822 – January 3, 1891) was a member of the New England Emigrant Aid Society who, along with Charles L. Robinson, helped found the city of Lawrence, Kansas, in 1854.

== Biography ==
Charles Branscomb was born on June 16, 1822, in Newmarket, New Hampshire. He attended Phillips Exeter Academy for his secondary education, graduating in 1839. Afterwards, he graduated from Dartmouth College (1845) and the Cambridge Law School (1848). After passing the bar, he served for a time as a lawyer in Holyoke, Massachusetts. In the 1850s, he became a member of the New England Emigrant Aid Society, at one point serving as its secretary pro tempore.

In 1854, he and Charles L. Robinson surveyed Kansas Territory, looking for suitable land upon which the Emigrant Aid Society could found a town dedicated to the free state cause. Later that year, he led the first group of colonists supported by the Emigrant Aid Society to the territory and helped establish the city of Lawrence. Until 1858, Branscomb worked for New England Emigrant Aid Society, after which he founded a private law firm in Lawrence. Branscomb later served in the territorial legislature and voted on the Leavenworth Constitution.

In the 1860s, he moved to St. Louis, where in 1866 he ran for a seat on the Missouri General Assembly against Francis Preston Blair Jr. The election was contested, but in the end, Branscomb won out after the Missouri Attorney General Robert Franklin Wingate ruled that votes cast after sundown were valid. When Ulysses S. Grant ascended to the US presidency, Branscomb was appointed consul to England and served in Manchester. In 1874, Branscomb returned to Lawrence, and in 1886 he ran for Kansas governor as the Prohibition Party nominee, coming in third (with 2.96% of the vote). In 1890, Branscomb and his family moved to Denver, Colorado, where he died on January 3, 1891, of pneumonia. He was buried at Holyoke.

== Election history ==
Governor's election in Kansas, 1886
Party	Candidate	Votes	%
Republican	John Martin	149,715	54.74
Democratic	Thomas Moonlight	115,667	42.29
Prohibition	Charles Branscomb	8,094	2.96
Total votes		273,476	99.99
Republican hold			
