= Governor Anthony =

Governor Anthony may refer to:

- George T. Anthony (1824–1896), 7th Governor of Kansas
- Henry B. Anthony (1815–1884), 21st Governor of Rhode Island
