= 1878 Kansas gubernatorial election =

- November 5, 1878
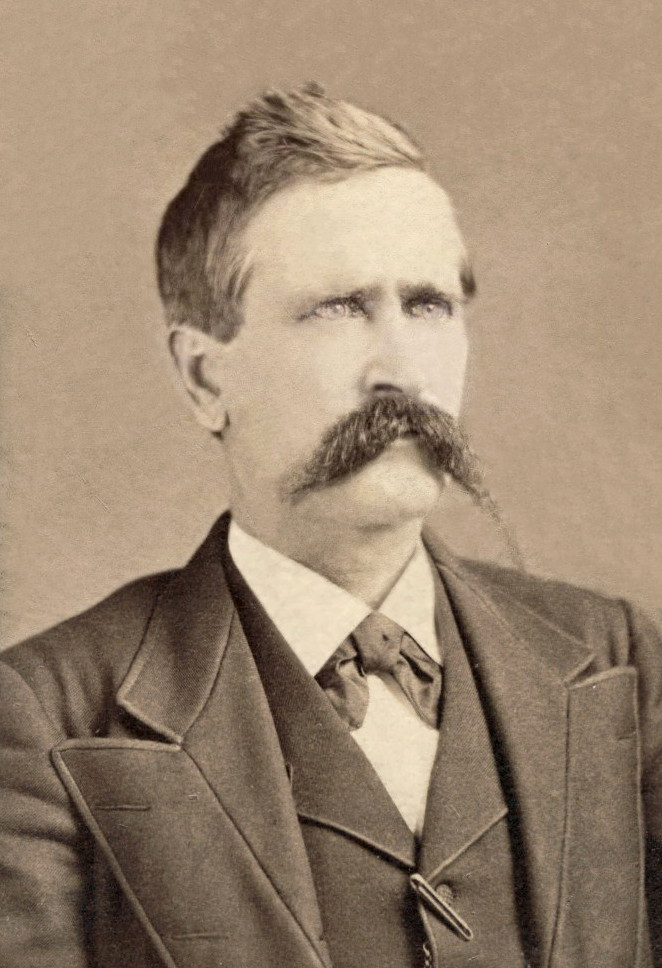

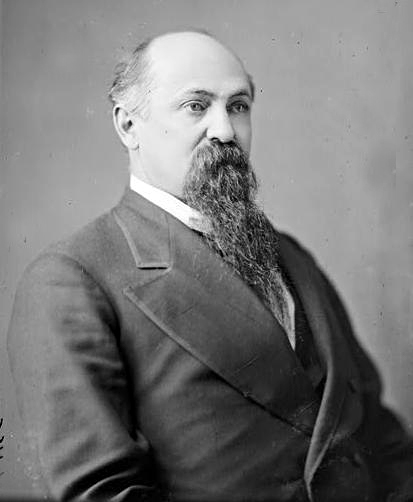

Nominee	John St. John	John R. Goodin	David P. Mitchell
Party	Republican	Democratic	Greenback
Popular vote	74,020	37,208	27,057
Percentage	53.52%	26.91%	19.57%
- County results St. John: 30–40% 40–50% 50–60% 60–70% 70–80% 80–90% Goodin: 40–50% 50–60% Mitchell: 40–50% No Votes
Governor before election
George T. Anthony
Republican
Elected Governor
John St. John
Republican

The 1878 Kansas gubernatorial election was held on November 5, 1878. Republican nominee John St. John defeated Democratic nominee John R. Goodin with 53.52% of the vote.

== General election ==
=== Candidates ===
Major party candidates

- John St. John, Republican
- John R. Goodin, Democratic

Other candidates

- David P. Mitchell, Greenback

=== Results ===
1878 Kansas gubernatorial election
Party	Candidate	Votes	%	±%
Republican	John St. John	74,020	53.52%	
Democratic	John R. Goodin	37,208	26.91%	
Greenback	David P. Mitchell	27,057	19.57%	
Majority		36,812		
Turnout				
Republican hold		Swing		
