= 1888 Kansas gubernatorial election =

- November 6, 1888
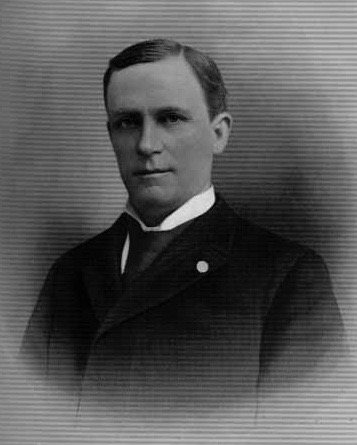

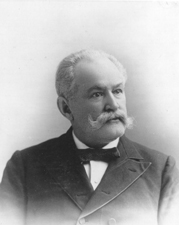

| Nominee | Lyman U. Humphrey | John Martin | Peter Percival Elder |
| Party | Republican | Democratic | Labor |
| Popular vote | 180,841 | 107,582 | 35,847 |
| Percentage | 54.68% | 32.53% | 10.84% |
- County results Humphrey: 40–50% 50–60% 60–70% Martin: 40–50% 50–60%
Governor before election
John Martin
Republican
Elected Governor
Lyman U. Humphrey
Republican

The 1888 Kansas gubernatorial election was held on November 6, 1888. Republican nominee Lyman U. Humphrey defeated Democratic nominee John Martin with 54.68% of the vote.

== General election ==
=== Candidates ===
Major party candidates

- Lyman U. Humphrey, Republican
- John Martin, Democratic

Other candidates

- Peter Percival Elder, Union Labor
- Jeremiah D. Botkin, Prohibition

=== Results ===
1888 Kansas gubernatorial election
| Party | Candidate | Votes | % | ±% |
|---|---|---|---|---|
| Republican | Lyman U. Humphrey | 180,841 | 54.68% | |
| Democratic | John Martin | 107,582 | 32.53% | |
| Labor | Peter Percival Elder | 35,847 | 10.84% | |
| Prohibition | Jeremiah D. Botkin | 6,439 | 1.95% | |
| Majority | | 73,259 | | |
| Turnout | | | | |
| Republican hold | | Swing | | |
