= Robert Byington Mitchell =

American general & territorial governor (1823–1882)

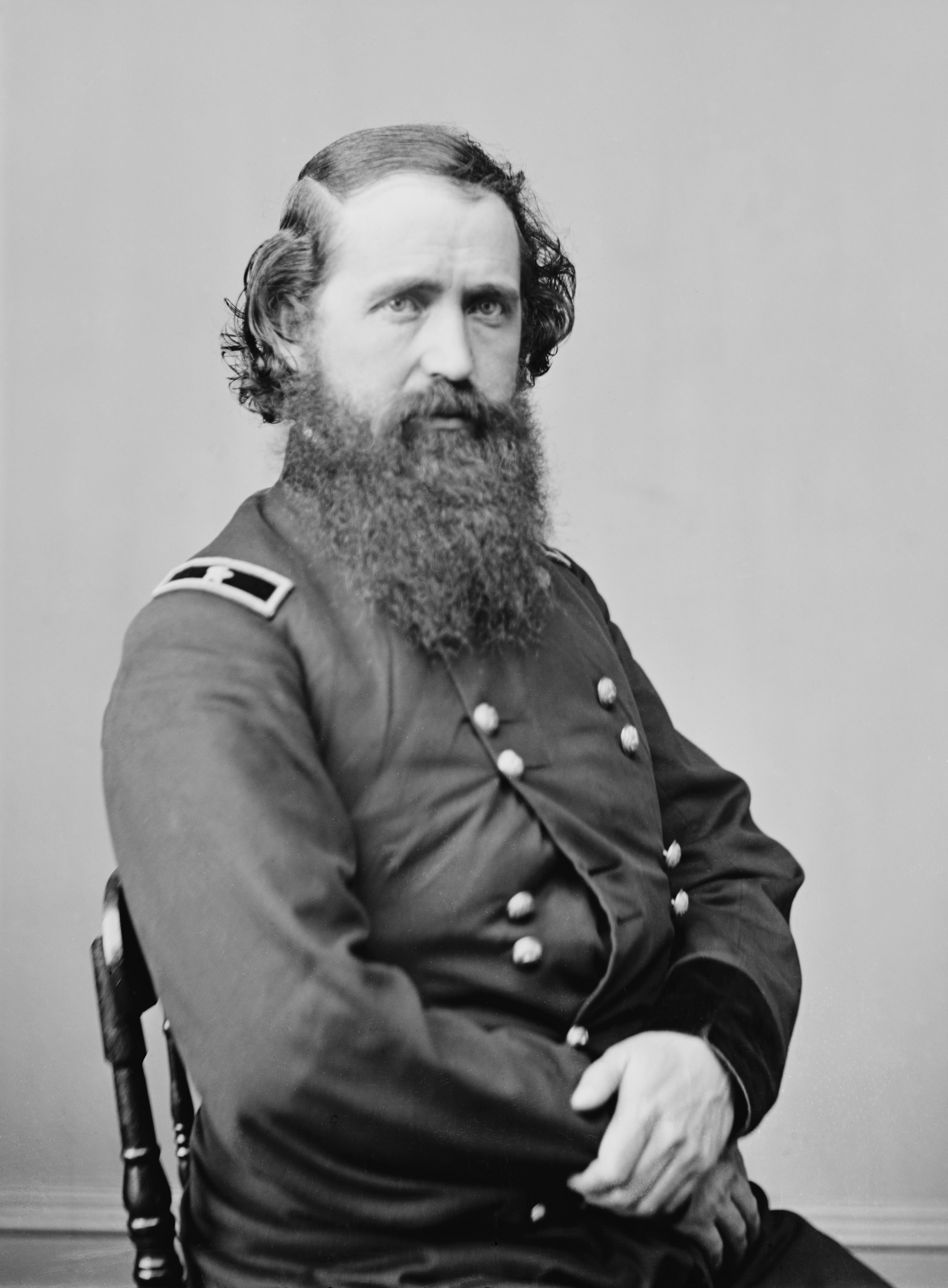

6th Governor of New Mexico Territory
- In office 1866–1869
- Preceded by: Henry Connelly
- Succeeded by: William A. Pile

Personal details
- Born: April 4, 1823 Mansfield, Ohio, US
- Died: January 26, 1882 (aged 58) Washington, D.C., US
- Resting place: Arlington National Cemetery
- Party: Democratic
- Profession: Lawyer, Politician

Robert Byington Mitchell (April 4, 1823 – January 26, 1882) was a brigadier general in the Union Army during the American Civil War and the governor of New Mexico Territory from 1866 to 1869.

== Early life and career ==
Mitchell was born on April 4, 1823, in Mansfield, Ohio. For some odd reason, it was recorded that he graduated from both Kenyon College and Washington College, although neither school has a record of his attendance.

He studied law in Mount Vernon, Ohio. After completing his studies, he practiced law in Mansfield. He served in the Mexican War as a second lieutenant in the 2nd Ohio Volunteers. He was elected mayor of Mount Gilead, Ohio, in 1855. Next year, he moved to Linn County, Kansas Territory. He served in the territorial legislature, as a delegate to the Leavenworth Convention, from 1857 to 1858. He served as treasurer of the Kansas Territory from 1859 to 1861. He was a delegate to the 1860 Democratic National Convention in Charleston, South Carolina.

== Civil War service ==
After the start of the Civil War, Mitchell served as the Adjutant General of Kansas from May 2, 1861, to June 20, 1861. He later led the 2nd Kansas Infantry. Mitchell was badly wounded at the Battle of Wilson's Creek on August 10, 1861, when his horse was shot while leading his regiment.

After recovery, U.S. President Abraham Lincoln appointed him as a brigadier general to rank from April 8, 1862, and he was given command of a mixed brigade at Fort Riley. He commanded the 9th Division in Charles C. Gilbert's III Corps at the Battle of Perryville. He was then sent to Nashville, Tennessee, where he remained for several months.

During the Chickamauga campaign, Mitchell served as George H. Thomas's Chief of Cavalry for the Army of the Cumberland. Just before the Third Battle of Chattanooga, he was ordered to Washington, D.C., for court-martial duty. According to some sources, this was due to severe wounds which incapacitated him from field duty but this is contradicted in the Official Records by Mitchell's own correspondence. Whether incapacitated or not, he would not see active campaigning again, and for the remainder of the Civil War, he commanded the District of Nebraska, then the District of North Kansas, and finally the District of Kansas. He saw service in Colorado Territory in January 1865, following the Indian raid on Julesburg, Colorado, on the Overland Trail, but he did not succeed in locating the Indian camp on the Republican River until after they had departed. While commander of the military District of Nebraska and in response to the Indian raid on Julesberg, Mitchell requested every ranch and military set the prairie ablaze to drive the Indians out. According to author and witness Eugene Ware, "They rolled as a vast confluent sheet of flame to the south.” The fire burned for more than three days along the banks of the Arkansas River in Kansas and Colorado with the flames reaching as far south as the Texas panhandle, with much of Nebraska south of the Platte River and west of Fort Kearny reduced to a blackened and desolate waste.

== Governor of New Mexico Territory ==
Mitchell was honorably mustered out of the army on January 15, 1866. On the same day, the United States Senate confirmed his nomination as the Governor of the New Mexico Territory. He took the oath of office on June 6, 1866. He never appeared to take his duties as governor seriously. He was often absent without explanation from the territorial capital, Santa Fe, forcing the legislature to forward bills it had passed to Washington, D.C., for approval of the United States Congress. He resigned as governor in 1869.

== Later life ==
After leaving the office, Mitchell returned to Kansas. He was unsuccessful in his bid to represent Kansas in the U.S. Congress in 1872. He then moved to Washington, D.C., where he died on January 26, 1882. He was buried with full military honors in Section 2, Grave 1023, of Arlington National Cemetery in Arlington, Virginia.

== See also ==
- List of American Civil War generals (Union)
