= 1876 Kansas gubernatorial election =

- November 7, 1876
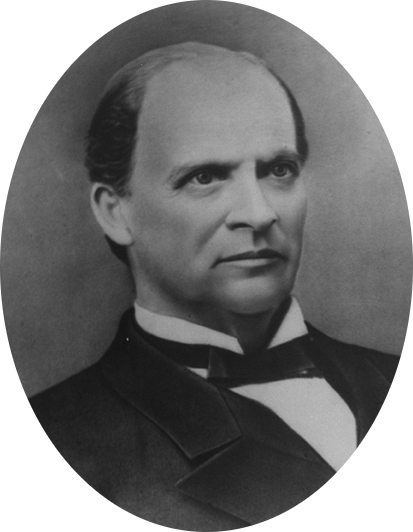

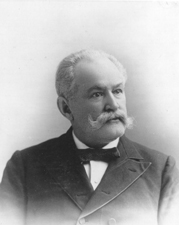
Nominee	George T. Anthony	John Martin
Party	Republican	Democratic
Popular vote	69,176	46,201
Percentage	56.78%	37.92%
- County results Anthony: 40–50% 50–60% 60–70% 70–80% >90% Martin: 40–50% 50–60% 60–70% No Data/Vote
Governor before election
Thomas A. Osborn
Republican
Elected Governor
George T. Anthony
Republican

The 1876 Kansas gubernatorial election was held on November 7, 1876. Republican nominee George T. Anthony defeated Democratic nominee John Martin with 56.78% of the vote.

== General election ==
=== Candidates ===
Major party candidates

- George T. Anthony, Republican
- John Martin, Democratic

Other candidates

- M. E. Hudson, Independent
- J. Paulson, Prohibition

=== Results ===
1876 Kansas gubernatorial election
Party	Candidate	Votes	%	±%
Republican	George T. Anthony	69,176	56.78%	
Democratic	John Martin	46,201	37.92%	
Independent	M. E. Hudson	6,020	4.94%	
Prohibition	J. Paulson	393	0.32%	
Majority		22,975		
Turnout				
Republican hold		Swing		
