= John Martin (Kansas politician) =

American politician (1833–1913)

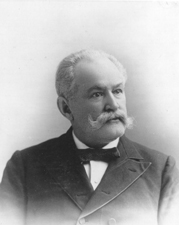

United States Senator from Kansas
- In office March 4, 1893 – March 3, 1895
- Preceded by: Bishop W. Perkins
- Succeeded by: Lucien Baker

Member of the Kansas House of Representatives
- In office 1871-1875

Personal details
- Born: November 12, 1833 Hartsville, Tennessee, U.S.
- Died: September 3, 1913 (aged 79) Topeka, Kansas, U.S.
- Party: Democratic

John Martin (November 12, 1833 – September 3, 1913) was an American lawyer and politician from Hartsville, Tennessee. He represented Kansas in the United States Senate from 1893 until 1895.

Martin was born near Hartsville, Trousdale County, Tennessee on November 12, 1833. He attended the common schools and clerked in stores and the post office, before moving to Tecumseh, Shawnee County, Kansas in 1855. He was elected assistant clerk of the first house of representatives in the Territory in 1855; county clerk and register of deeds 1855-1857; studied law; admitted to the bar in 1856 and commenced practice in Tecumseh; justice of the peace 1857; county attorney of Shawnee County 1858-1860; postmaster of Tecumseh 1858-1859; deputy United States attorney 1859-1861; reporter of the State supreme court 1860; moved to Topeka and practiced law in 1861; member, State house of representatives 1871-1875; unsuccessful Democratic candidate for governor in 1876 and for the United States Senate in 1877; district judge 1883-1885; unsuccessful candidate for election to the Fiftieth Congress; unsuccessful candidate for governor in 1888.

Martin was elected as a Democrat to the United States Senate on January 25, 1893, to fill the remainder of the term left vacant by the death of Preston B. Plumb. The circumstances of his election were highly controversial. Several weeks after Martin took office, 77 members of the Kansas Legislature protested Martin’s election before the Senate Committee on Privileges and Elections. Two competing bodies had claimed to be the Kansas House of Representatives. The Governor and the Kansas State Senate agreed on which was legitimate. However, the recognized house fell short of their quorum during the senatorial election. The presiding officer allowed two “rump legislators” to vote for Martin while excluding the rest of the illegitimate body. The "rump house" then held its own election, voting for Republican Joseph W. Ady. The Kansas Supreme Court ruled that the "rump house" was the legal legislature, disbanding the body which elected Martin. Nonetheless, Martin served in the US Senate from March 4, 1893, to March 3, 1895; chairman, Committee on Railroads (Fifty-third Congress).

Martin later became the clerk of the Supreme Court of Kansas, serving from 1897 to 1899. Martin died in Topeka, Kansas on September 3, 1913, and was interred in Topeka Cemetery.

Party political offices
Preceded by James C. Cusey	Democratic nominee for Governor of Kansas; 1876	Succeeded by John R. Goodin
Preceded by Thomas Moonlight	Democratic nominee for Governor of Kansas; 1888	Succeeded by Charles L. Robinson
U.S. Senate
Preceded by Bishop W. Perkins	U.S. senator (Class 2) from Kansas; 1893–1895; Served alongside: William A. Peffer	Succeeded by Lucien Baker
