= 1884 Kansas gubernatorial election =

- November 4, 1884
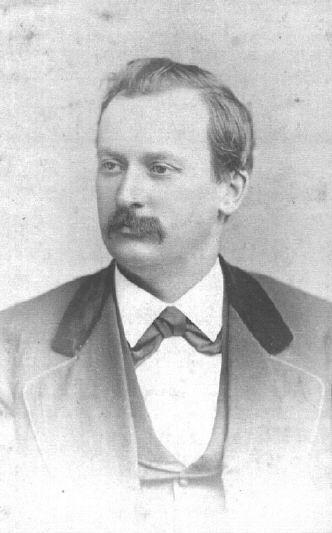

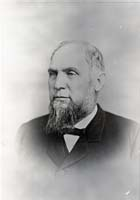
Nominee	John Martin	George Washington Glick
Party	Republican	Democratic
Popular vote	146,777	108,284
Percentage	55.34%	40.83%
- County results Martin: 40–50% 50–60% 60–70% Glick: 50–60% No Data/Vote
Governor before election
George Washington Glick
Democratic
Elected Governor
John Martin
Republican

The 1884 Kansas gubernatorial election was held on November 4, 1884. Republican nominee John Martin defeated Democratic incumbent George Washington Glick with 55.34% of the vote.

== General election ==
=== Candidates ===
Major party candidates

- John Martin, Republican
- George Washington Glick, Democratic

Other candidates

- H.L. Phillips, Greenback Labor

=== Results ===
1884 Kansas gubernatorial election
Party	Candidate	Votes	%	±%
Republican	John Martin	146,777	55.34%	
Democratic	George Washington Glick (incumbent)	108,284	40.83%	
Greenback	H.L. Phillips	9,998	3.77%	
Majority		38,493		
Turnout				
Republican gain from Democratic		Swing		
