= Senator Thatcher =

Senator Thatcher may refer to:

- Daniel Thatcher (born 1976), Utah State Senate
- Kim Thatcher (born 1964), Oregon State Senate

== See also ==
- Senator Thacher (disambiguation)
