= Greencastle, Ohio =

Unincorporated community in Ohio, U.S.

Coordinates: 39°46′26″N 82°45′39″W

Greencastle is an unincorporated community in Fairfield County, in the U.S. state of Ohio.

== History ==
Greencastle was laid out in 1810. A post office called Greencastle was established in 1845, and remained in operation until 1902.

== Notable person ==
George Washington Glick, 9th Governor of Kansas
