= 1866 Kansas gubernatorial election =

- November 6, 1866
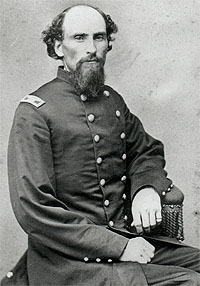

Nominee	Samuel J. Crawford	James L. McDowell
Party	Republican	National Union
Popular vote	19,370	8,152
Percentage	70.38%	29.62%
- County results Schoeppel: 50–60% 60–70% 70–80% 80–90% >90% McDowell: 50–60%
Governor before election
Samuel J. Crawford
Republican
Elected Governor
Samuel J. Crawford
Republican

A gubernatorial election was held in Kansas on November 6, 1866. The Republican governor Samuel J. Crawford defeated the National Union former mayor of Leavenworth James L. McDowell.

== Results ==
Kansas gubernatorial election, 1866
Party	Candidate	Votes	%
Republican	Samuel J. Crawford (incumbent)	19,370	70.38
National Union	James L. McDowell	8,152	29.62
Total votes		27,522	100.00
Republican hold			
