= Lucien Baker =

American politician (1846–1907)

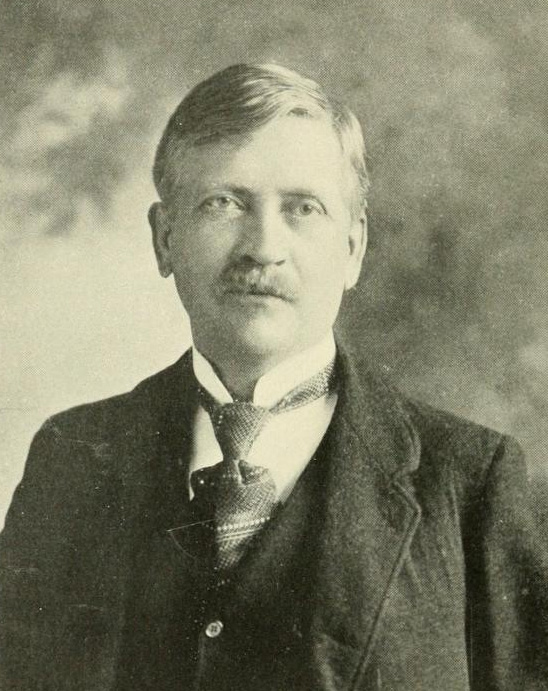

United States Senator from Kansas
- In office March 4, 1895 – March 3, 1901
- Preceded by: John Martin
- Succeeded by: Joseph R. Burton

Member of the Kansas Senate from the 3rd district
- In office 1893-1895
- Preceded by: Ira F. Collins
- Succeeded by: Percival Lowe

Personal details
- Born: June 8, 1846 Cleveland, Ohio, U.S.
- Died: June 21, 1907 (aged 61) Leavenworth, Kansas, U.S.
- Party: Republican
- Education: University of Michigan Law School

Lucien Baker (June 8, 1846 – June 21, 1907) was a United States senator from Kansas.

Baker was born near Cleveland, Ohio and moved with his parents to Morenci, Michigan. There he attended public schools and graduated from Adrian College and from the law department of the University of Michigan at Ann Arbor.

He was admitted to the bar in 1868 and commenced practice in Leavenworth, Kansas in 1869. From 1872 to 1874, he was a city attorney of Leavenworth.

From 1893 to 1895, he was a member of the State Senate and was elected as a Republican to the United States Senate. He served from March 4, 1895 to March 3, 1901 but was an unsuccessful candidate for renomination. He was the chairman of the Committee on Civil Service and Retrenchment (Fifty-sixth Congress)

Afterward his term in the Senate, he resumed the practice of law in Leavenworth, where he died on June 21, 1907; he is interred in Mount Muncie Cemetery.

He was the brother of John Baker.

== Sources ==
- United States Congress. "Lucien Baker (id: B000070)". Biographical Directory of the United States Congress.
- Johnson, Rossiter, ed. (1906). "Baker, Lucien". The Biographical Dictionary of America. Vol. 1. Boston: American Biographical Society. p. 192.

U.S. Senate
Preceded by John Martin	U.S. senator (Class 2) from Kansas; 1895–1901; Served alongside: William A. Peffer, William A. Harris	Succeeded by Joseph R. Burton
