= 1886 Kansas gubernatorial election =

- November 2, 1886
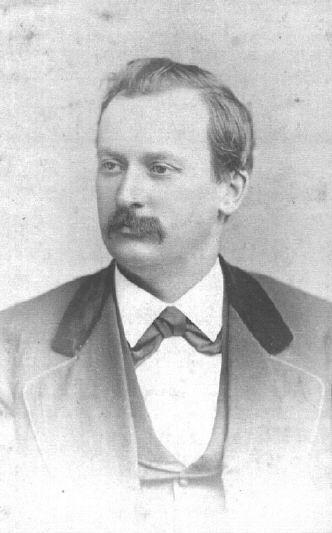

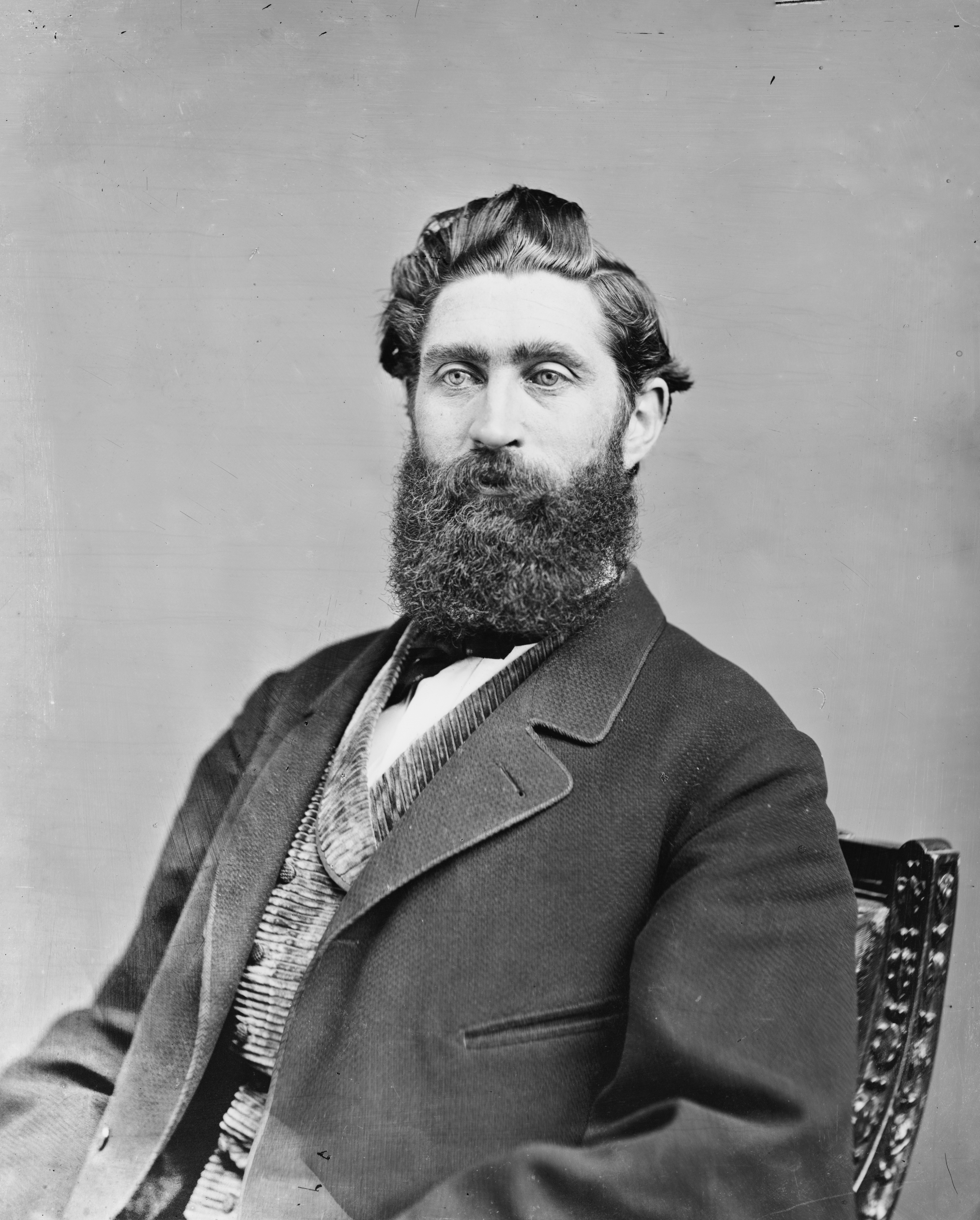
Nominee	John Martin	Thomas Moonlight
Party	Republican	Democratic
Popular vote	149,715	115,667
Percentage	54.74%	42.29%
- County results Martin: 40–50% 50–60% 60–70% Moonlight: 40–50% 50–60% 60–70% No Data/Vote
Governor before election
John Martin
Republican
Elected Governor
John Martin
Republican

The 1886 Kansas gubernatorial election was held on November 2, 1886. Incumbent Republican John Martin defeated Democratic nominee Thomas Moonlight with 54.74% of the vote.

== General election ==
=== Candidates ===
Major party candidates

- John Martin, Republican
- Thomas Moonlight, Democratic

Other candidates

- C. H. Brancombe, Prohibition

=== Results ===
1886 Kansas gubernatorial election
Party	Candidate	Votes	%	±%
Republican	John Martin (incumbent)	149,715	54.74%	
Democratic	Thomas Moonlight	115,667	42.29%	
Prohibition	C. H. Brancombe	8,094	2.96%	
Majority		34,048		
Turnout				
Republican hold		Swing		
