= 1880 Kansas gubernatorial election =

- November 2, 1880
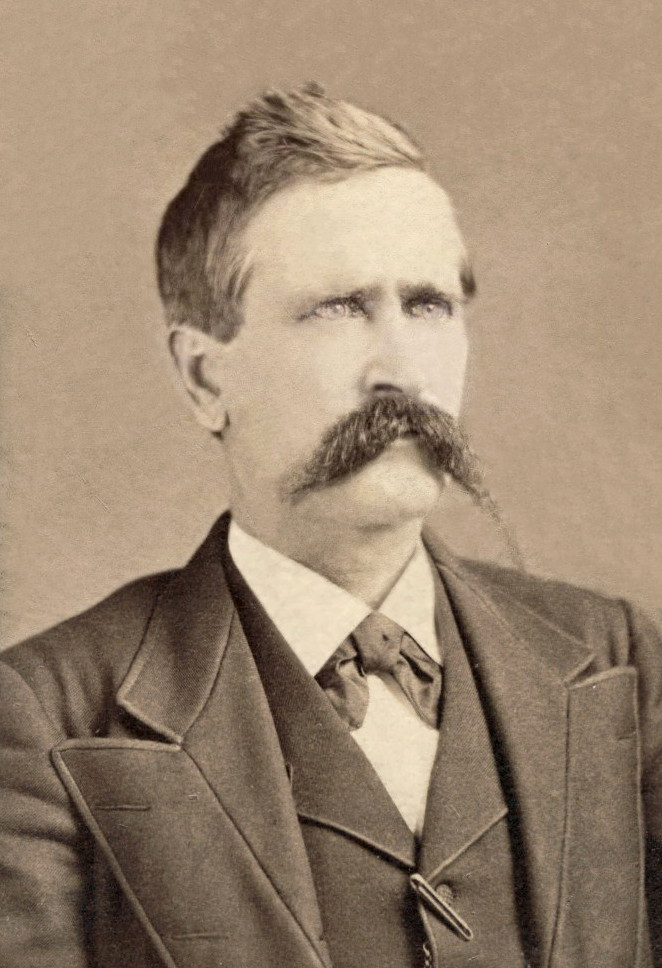

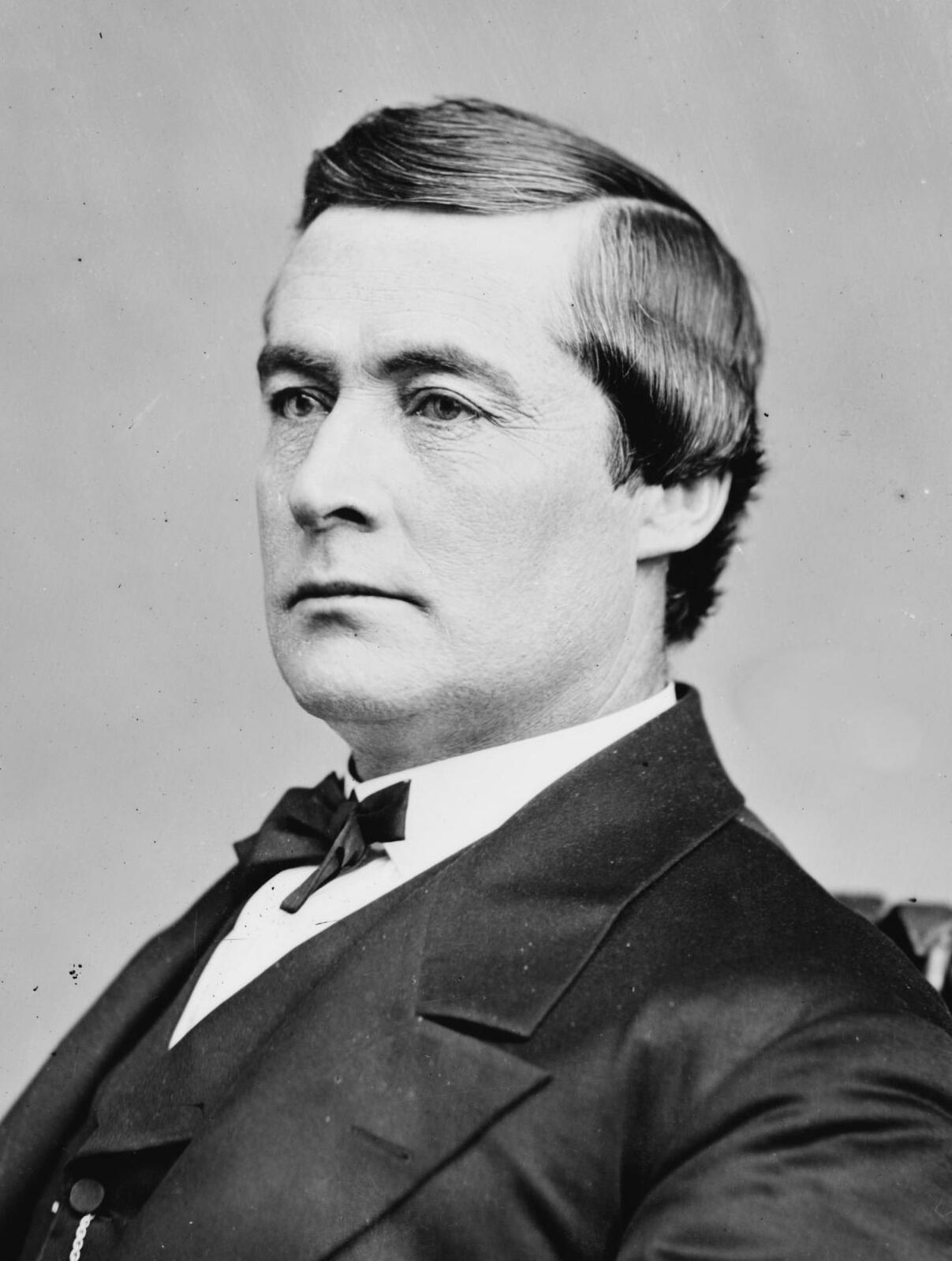

Nominee	John St. John	Edmund G. Ross	H. P. Vrooman
Party	Republican	Democratic	Greenback
Popular vote	115,144	63,557	19,481
Percentage	57.90%	31.96%	9.80%
- County results St. John: 40–50% 50–60% 60–70% 70–80% Ross: 50–60% No Data/Vote
Governor before election
John St. John
Republican
Elected Governor
John St. John
Republican

The 1880 Kansas gubernatorial election was held on November 2, 1880. Incumbent Republican John St. John defeated Democratic nominee Edmund G. Ross with 57.90% of the vote.

== General election ==
=== Candidates ===
Major party candidates

- John St. John, Republican
- Edmund G. Ross, Democratic

Other candidates

- H. P. Vrooman, Greenback
- J. P. Culver, Prohibition
- F. M. Stringfield, Independent

=== Results ===
1880 Kansas gubernatorial election
Party	Candidate	Votes	%	±%
Republican	John St. John (incumbent)	115,144	57.90%	
Democratic	Edmund G. Ross	63,557	31.96%	
Greenback	H. P. Vrooman	19,481	9.80%	
Prohibition	J. P. Culver	435	0.22%	
Independent	F. M. Stringfield	210	0.11%	
Majority		51,587		
Turnout				
Republican hold		Swing		
