= 19th Kansas Volunteers =

Defunct volunteer cavalry regiment

The Nineteenth Kansas Volunteers or the Nineteenth Kansas Cavalry was a volunteer cavalry regiment mustered for a six-month service, in 1868, in response to hostilities concerning the Plains Indians.

== History ==
Then-governor Samuel J. Crawford, formed the 1200 strong regiment in response to the request from General Philip H. Sheridan. Crawford then resigned his post and was appointed colonel of the regiment, 7 November 1868. The regiment was moved to Camp Supply, with some difficulty due to lack of familiarity with the terrain and the inclement winter weather, arriving only after guides from the camp intercepted them.

On 7 December, the regiment headed south under Sheridan in close pursuit of their enemy. By March, all the tribes had surrendered, and the regiment was then barracked at Fort Hays, where it remained until April 1869, when it was demobilized.
