= Charles W. Blair =

Charles White Blair
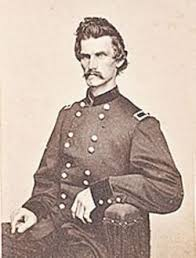
- Born: February 5, 1829; Georgetown, Ohio
- Died: August 20, 1899 (aged 70); Coronado Beach, California
- Burial place: Mount Washington Cemetery, Independence, Missouri
- Military career
- Allegiance: United States of America; Union
- Branch: United States Army; Union Army
- Service years: 1861-1865
- Rank: Brevet Brigadier General, U.S.V.
- Units: 2nd Kansas Infantry; 2nd Kansas Cavalry; 14th Kansas Cavalry
- Conflicts: American Civil War; Battle of Wilson's Creek; First Battle of Newtonia; Battle of Westport; Battle of Mine Creek
- Other work: Lawyer

Charles White Blair (February 5, 1829 – August 20, 1899) was a lawyer, and Union Army officer who served in three different regiments during the American Civil War. He fought primarily in the Trans-Mississippi Theater and was notable during Price's Missouri Raid.

== Early life and career ==
Blair was born in Georgetown, Ohio February 5, 1829. He became a lawyer before moving to Kansas. At the outbreak of the war, he was commissioned a captain in the 2nd Kansas Volunteer Infantry Regiment and fought at the battle of Wilson's Creek. He resigned in October 1861 but was reappointed as major of the 2nd Kansas Cavalry in February 1862. He fought with the 2nd Kansas Cavalry at the first Battle of Newtonia. Blair commanded Fort Scott during 1863. In October 1863 he was appointed lieutenant colonel of the 14th Kansas Cavalry, his third and final regiment of the war. In November 1863 he was promoted to colonel of that regiment.

== Command of the 3rd Brigade ==
Throughout 1864 the 14th Kansas Cavalry was attached to the VII Corps and fought under Frederick Steele during the Camden Expedition. During this time however, Company E was detached to the Department of Kansas under Samuel R. Curtis. Blair personally accompanied this detachment to the headquarters of James G. Blunt's Provisional Cavalry Division of the Army of the Border.

There, he was placed in command of Blunt's 3rd Brigade. This command assignment proved to be a cumbersome arrangement for Blair.

The 3rd Brigade was primarily composed of Kansas State Militia regiments of Brigadier General William H. M. Fishback's command. Fishback resented taking orders from a colonel.

The command structure of the 3rd Brigade became a "brigade within a brigade". Fishback was in direct command of the militia regiments attached to the 3rd Brigade while Blair was in overall command of the brigade which also included his own 14th Kansas Cavalry detachment and the 9th Wisconsin Artillery Battery. When the Union army moved east, the Kansas State Militia units refused to cross over into Missouri, claiming they would defend Kansas, not Missouri. Fishback used the opportunity to send one regiment back home without orders. Blunt had Fishback arrested but he was soon released by order of General Curtis. Fishback returned to his militia units within the 3rd Brigade and was instructed to take orders from Blair and General Blunt. This affair caused Blair's brigade to miss the fighting at the second battle of Lexington. As the Union forces retreated from Independence, Blair's men constructed earthworks along the Big Blue River.

== Westport ==
At the battle of the Big Blue River Blair's brigade was attached to the Kansas Militia Division under General George Deitzler. The militia units in general fared poorly in their first real engagement and retreated with the rest of the Union army into Westport.

Blunt arranged three of his brigades in a line of battle south of Westport with Blair in support. As the battle raged back and forth Curtis arrived at the front with Blair's brigade and directed it into position perpendicular to the Kansas/Missouri state line. Fearful of a being outflanked, Blair initiated a counter-attack. Curtis ordered the rest of the army forward in support of Blair's bold move. The attack bogged down, but at this critical moment Curtis personally led Blair's 9th Wisconsin Battery through a gulch which opened fire on the Confederate flank. This turned the tide of the battle and the Confederates began a retreat. Blair's brigade formed in the center of the Union army as it made a general advance against the faltering Confederate line.

== Mine Creek and post war career ==
The sense of urgency gone with the victory at Westport, most of the Kansas Militia units returned home. A few units in Blair's brigade remained in the field and took part in the pursuit of Confederates. Alfred Pleasonton's Union cavalry caught the retreating Confederate forces along Mine Creek in Kansas. Hampered by their wagon train many Confederates were taken prisoner including two generals. One of these generals was John S. Marmaduke who formally surrendered to Blair. Blair received a brevet promotion to brigadier general on February 13, 1865 and was mustered out of the volunteer service on August 11, 1865.

After the war Blair returned to his legal practice. He died at Coronado Beach, California on August 20, 1899.
