= John R. Goodin =

American politician (1836–1885)

John Randolph Goodin
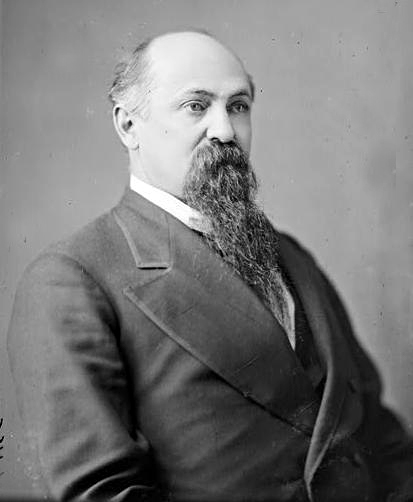

Member of the U.S. House of Representatives from Kansas's 2nd district
- In office March 4, 1875 – March 3, 1877
- Preceded by: District created
- Succeeded by: Dudley C. Haskell

Member of the Kansas House of Representatives
- In office 1866

Personal details
- Born: December 14, 1836 Tiffin, Ohio, US
- Died: December 18, 1885 (aged 49) Kansas City, Kansas, US
- Party: Democratic
- Spouse: Naomi Monroe
- Profession: Politician, Lawyer, Judge, Editor

John Randolph Goodin (December 14, 1836 – December 18, 1885) was an American politician, lawyer, judge and editor from Ohio and Kansas.

Born in Tiffin, Ohio, Goodin moved to Kenton, Ohio with his father in 1844. He attended Kenton High School and Geneva College, studied law and was admitted to the bar in 1857, commencing practice in Kenton. He moved to Humboldt, Kansas in 1859, was elected to the Kansas House of Representatives in 1866 and was judge of the seventh judicial district of Kansas from 1868 to 1876. Goodin was elected a Democrat to the United States House of Representatives in 1874, serving from 1875 to 1877, being unsuccessful for reelection in 1876. Afterwards, he was editor of the Inter State in Humboldt, Kansas and moved to Kansas City, Kansas in 1883 where he died on December 18, 1885. He was interred in Oak Grove Cemetery in Kansas City.

Party political offices
Preceded by John Martin	Democratic nominee for Governor of Kansas; 1878	Succeeded by Edmund G. Ross
U.S. House of Representatives
New district	Member of the U.S. House of Representatives from Kansas's 2nd congressional district March 4, 1875 – March 3, 1877	Succeeded by Dudley C. Haskell
