= 2nd Kansas Colored Infantry Regiment =

2nd Kansas Colored Infantry Regiment 83rd US Colored Infantry Regiment
- Active: August 11, 1863 – October 9, 1865
- Country: United States
- Allegiance: Union
- Branch: Infantry
- Engagements: American Civil War; Battle of Baxter Springs; Battle of Prairie D'Ane; Battle of Jenkins' Ferry

The 2nd Kansas Colored Infantry Regiment was an infantry regiment that served in the Union Army during the American Civil War. Initially assigned to garrison duties, the regiment fought in several battles of the 1864 Camden Expedition in Arkansas. The regiment was renamed the 83rd US Colored Infantry Regiment in December, 1864, and was mustered out of service in October, 1865.

== Service ==
The 2nd Kansas Infantry (Colored) was organized at Fort Scott, Kansas, and mustered in for three years. It mustered in by individual companies beginning in August 1863 at Fort Scott and completed muster-in at Fort Smith, Arkansas, on November 1, 1863, under the command of Colonel Samuel Johnson Crawford.

The regiment was attached to District of the Frontier, Department of Missouri, to January 1864. Unattached, District of the Frontier, VII Corps, Department of Arkansas, to March 1864. 2nd Brigade, District of the Frontier, VII Corps, to December 1864.

== Detailed service ==
Action at Baxter Springs, Kansas, October 6, 1863 (Company A). Moved from Fort Scott, Kansas, to Fort Smith, Arkansas, October 19, 1863, as escort to train. Duty at Fort Smith until March 1864. Steele's Expedition to Camden March 23-April 30. Prairie D'Ann April 9–13. Jenkins' Ferry April 30, and May 4 and 8. Return to Fort Smith and duty there until December.

The regiment played a prominent role in the April 1864 Battle of Jenkins' Ferry, charging and capturing a Confederate artillery battery. Soldiers of the 2nd Kansas were reported to have executed Confederate prisoners after the battle, in retribution for similar murders of Black troops by Southerners at the Battle of Poison Spring a few weeks prior.

== Casualties ==
The regiment lost at least 71 men during service; one officer and 70 enlisted men killed or mortally wounded. The numbers are incomplete because the regiment's records were lost after the action at Jenkins' Ferry. 211 men of the regiment died from disease during the war.

== Commanders ==
Commanding officers of the 2nd Kansas/83rd Colored Infantry:

- Colonel Samuel Johnson Crawford, resigned November 1864.
- Lieutenant Colonel J. Howard Gillpatrick, awarded brevet brigadier general, October 1865.
- Lieutenant Colonel Horatio Knowles, resigned May 1864.

== Notable members ==
- Captain Alexander Rush, Company H - Namesake of Rush County, Kansas, killed at the Battle of Jenkins' Ferry, on April 30, 1864

== See also ==
- List of Kansas Civil War Units
- List of United States Colored Troops Civil War units
- Kansas in the Civil War
