= 143rd Illinois Infantry Regiment =

143rd Regiment Illinois Volunteer Infantry
- Illinois state flag
- Active: June 11, 1864, to September 26, 1864
- Country: United States
- Allegiance: Union
- Branch: Infantry

The 143rd Regiment Illinois Volunteer Infantry was an infantry regiment that served in the Union Army during the American Civil War. It was among scores of regiments that were raised in the summer of 1864 as Hundred Days Men, an effort to augment existing manpower for an all-out push to end the war within 100 days.

== Service ==
The 143rd Illinois Infantry was organized at Mattoon, Illinois, and mustered into Federal service on June 11, 1864, for a one-hundred-day enlistment. The 143rd served in garrisons, first in the Memphis, Tennessee, area and later at Helena, Arkansas.

The regiment was mustered out of service on September 26, 1864.

== Total strength and casualties ==
The regiment suffered 55 enlisted men who died of disease, for a total of 55 fatalities.

== Commanders ==
- Colonel Dudley C. Smith - mustered out with the regiment.

== See also ==
- List of Illinois Civil War Units
- Illinois in the American Civil War
