= Lyman U. Humphrey =

American politician (1844–1915)

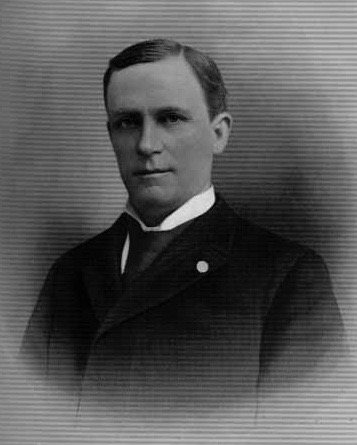

11th Governor of Kansas
- In office January 14, 1889 – January 9, 1893
- Lieutenant: Andrew Jackson Felt
- Preceded by: John A. Martin
- Succeeded by: Lorenzo D. Lewelling

8th Lieutenant Governor of Kansas
- In office 1877–1881
- Governor: George T. Anthony; John P. St. John
- Preceded by: Melville J. Salter
- Succeeded by: David Wesley Finney

Member of the Kansas House of Representatives
- In office 1876

Personal details
- Born: July 25, 1844 New Baltimore, Ohio, US
- Died: September 12, 1915 (aged 71) Independence, Kansas, US
- Party: Republican
- Spouse: Amanda Leonard (m. 1872)
- Education: University of Michigan (J.D.)
- Profession: Soldier, attorney, teacher, newspaper editor, politician

Lyman Underwood Humphrey (July 25, 1844 – September 12, 1915) was the 11th governor of Kansas.

== Early life ==
Humphrey was born in New Baltimore, Ohio, to Lyman and Elizabeth (Everhart) Humphrey, one of two sons born to the couple. His father was born in Connecticut, but relocated to Deerfield, Ohio, where he purchased a tannery formerly owned by Jesse Grant (father of Ulysses S. Grant). Humphrey's father gave up the tannery business after several years and began to practice law. His father died in 1853 and through the influence of his mother, Humphrey received a common school education first in New Baltimore and then high school in Massillon, Ohio. He left school in 1861 to join the 76th Ohio Infantry. He later received his J.D. from the University of Michigan in 1867.

== Civil War ==
The 76th Ohio was part of the Army of the Tennessee. Humphrey rose quickly through the ranks and was promoted to first lieutenant. He participated in twenty-seven battles and skirmishes including Fort Donelson, Shiloh, Corinth, the siege of Vicksburg, Resaca, and Atlanta. The regiment participated in the march to the sea and through the Carolinas to the battle of Bentonville. At Ringgold Gap on November 27, 1863, Humphrey was wounded but missed no duty due to the wound. He was mustered out with the regiment at Louisville, Kentucky on July 19, 1865.

== Personal life ==
Humphrey married Amanda Leonard on December 25, 1872, in Beardstown, Illinois. They had four sons, two of whom died in infancy.

== Professional career ==
Following the Civil War, Humphrey attended Mount Union College for one year followed by a year in the law department of the University of Michigan. Short on funds, Humphrey left school, but was admitted to the Ohio bar in 1868. He moved to Shelby County, Missouri where he became a teacher and newspaper editor of the Shelby County Herald. Humphrey was admitted to the Missouri bar in 1870.

The following year, Humphrey moved to Independence, Kansas, where he practiced law and started the South Kansas Tribune newspaper. He gave up the newspaper a year later and settled into the practice of law full-time, until December 1872 when he helped found the Commercial Bank of Independence. Humphrey became the bank's president and helped reorganize the bank in 1891 as the Commercial National Bank. He continued with the bank until he was elected governor.

== Politics ==
Humphrey was a devoted Republican and was active in party politics in every state in which he lived. In 1872 he unsuccessfully ran for the Kansas House of Representatives because he opposed the issue of railroad bonds. Four years later he was overwhelmingly elected to represent Montgomery County in the Kansas House of Representatives. Before his term expired, Humphrey was appointed the ninth lieutenant governor to fill the vacancy left by Melville J. Salter. During the regular election of 1878, he was elected to the same position by a margin of 40,000 votes. Humphrey completed his term as lieutenant governor and was elected to the Kansas Senate in 1884.

== Governor of Kansas ==
Humphrey ran for governor in 1888 and won the position by the largest plurality to that time in Kansas; he won the majority vote in all but two counties. He defeated the Democratic candidate John Martin (not to be confused with the previous Republican Governor of Kansas John A. Martin). Humphrey was reelected to a second term in 1890.

== Later life ==
Following his term as governor, Humphrey returned to the practice of law. In 1892, he ran unsuccessfully for the United States House of Representatives. Humphrey died at Independence on September 12, 1915, and is buried in Mount Hope Cemetery.

== See also ==
- List of governors of Kansas

== Footnotes ==
Party political offices
Preceded by John Martin	Republican nominee for Governor of Kansas; 1888, 1890	Succeeded by Abram W. Smith
Political offices
Preceded by Melville J. Salter	Lieutenant Governor of Kansas; 1877–1881	Succeeded by David Wesley Finney
Preceded by John A. Martin	Governor of Kansas; 1889–1893	Succeeded by Lorenzo D. Lewelling
