= 1882 Kansas gubernatorial election =

- November 7, 1882
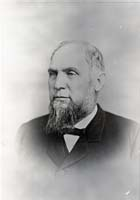

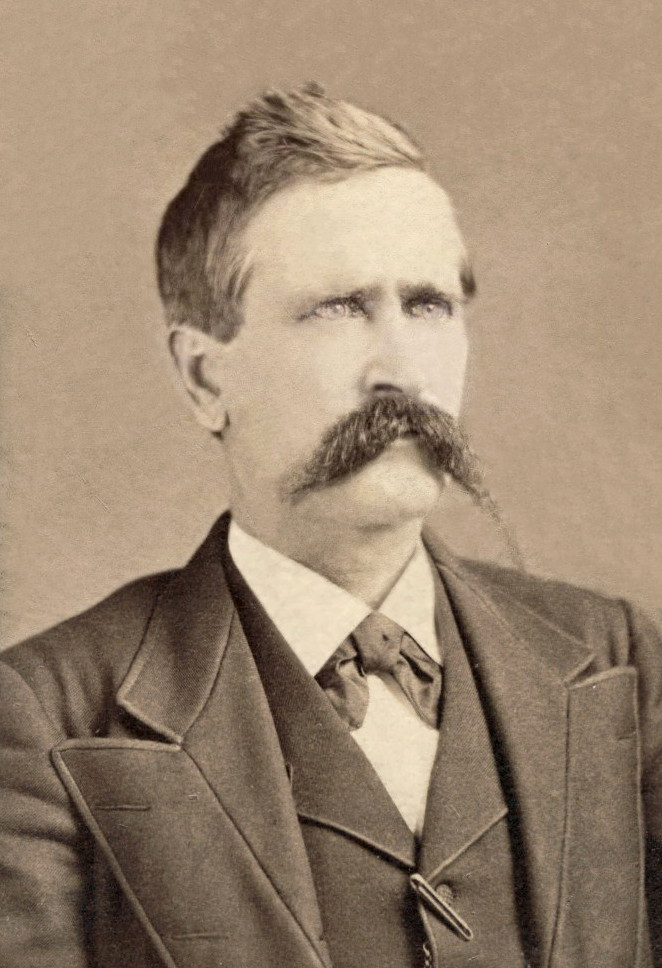

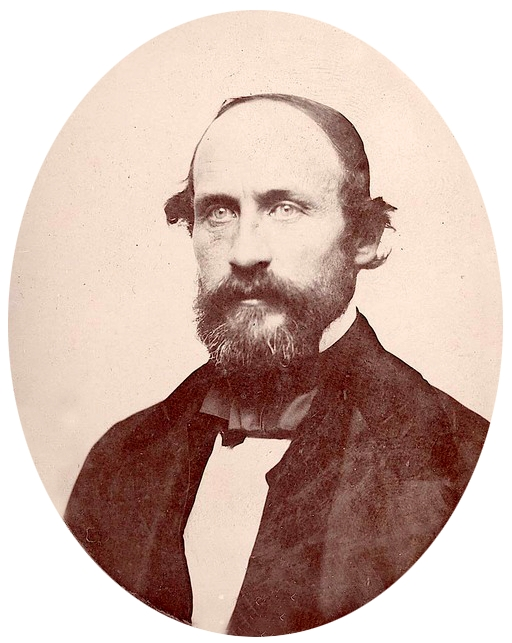
Nominee	George Washington Glick	John St. John	Charles L. Robinson
Party	Democratic	Republican	Greenback
Popular vote	83,232	75,158	20,933
Percentage	46.40%	41.90%	11.67%
- County results Glick: 30–40% 40–50% 50–60% 60–70% 70–80% St. John: 40–50% 50–60% 60–70% No Data/Vote
Governor before election
John St. John
Republican
Elected Governor
George Washington Glick
Democratic

The 1882 Kansas gubernatorial election was held on November 7, 1882. Democratic nominee George Washington Glick defeated incumbent Republican John St. John with 46.40% of the vote.

== General election ==
=== Candidates ===
Major party candidates

- George Washington Glick, Democratic
- John St. John, Republican

Other candidates

- Charles L. Robinson, Greenback

=== Results ===
1882 Kansas gubernatorial election
Party	Candidate	Votes	%	±%
Democratic	George Washington Glick	83,232	46.40%	
Republican	John St. John (incumbent)	75,158	41.90%	
Greenback	Charles L. Robinson	20,933	11.67%	
Majority		8,074		
Turnout				
Democratic gain from Republican		Swing		
