= 1890 Kansas gubernatorial election =

- November 4, 1890
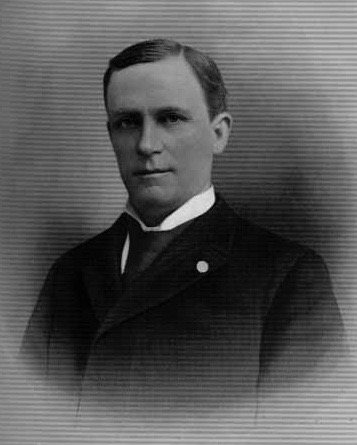

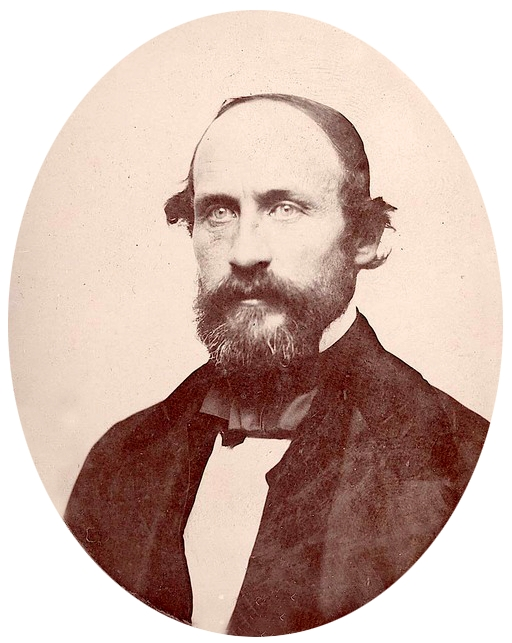
| Nominee | Lyman U. Humphrey | John F. Willits | Charles L. Robinson |
| Party | Republican | Populist | Democratic |
| Popular vote | 115,024 | 106,945 | 71,357 |
| Percentage | 39.05% | 36.31% | 24.23% |
- County results Humphrey: 30–40% 40–50% 50–60% 60–70% Willits: 30–40% 40–50% 50–60% Robinson: 30–40% 40–50% 50–60% 60–70%
Governor before election
Lyman U. Humphrey
Republican
Elected Governor
Lyman U. Humphrey
Republican

The 1890 Kansas gubernatorial election was held on November 4, 1890. Incumbent Republican Lyman U. Humphrey defeated People's Party nominee John F. Willits with 39.05% of the vote.

== General election ==
=== Candidates ===
Major party candidates

- Lyman U. Humphrey, Republican
- Charles L. Robinson, Democratic

Other candidates

- John F. Willits, People's
- A. M. Richardson, Prohibition

=== Results ===
1890 Kansas gubernatorial election
| Party | Candidate | Votes | % | ±% |
|---|---|---|---|---|
| Republican | Lyman U. Humphrey (incumbent) | 115,024 | 39.05% | |
| Populist | John F. Willits | 106,945 | 36.31% | |
| Democratic | Charles L. Robinson | 71,357 | 24.23% | |
| Prohibition | A. M. Richardson | 1,230 | 0.42% | |
| Majority | | 8,079 | | |
| Turnout | | | | |
| Republican hold | | Swing | | |
