= John Martin (governor of Kansas) =

10th Governor of Kansas

John A. Martin
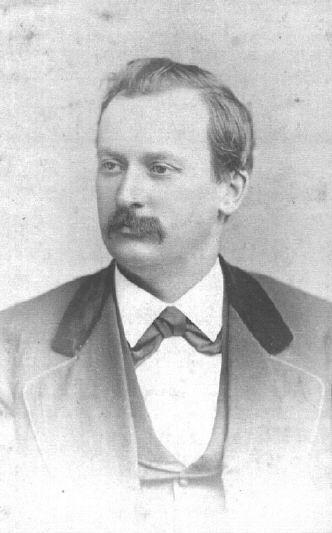

10th Governor of Kansas
- In office January 12, 1885 – January 14, 1889
- Lieutenant: Alexander Pancoast Riddle
- Preceded by: George W. Glick
- Succeeded by: Lyman U. Humphrey

Member of the Kansas Senate
- In office 1859-1861

Personal details
- Born: March 10, 1839 Brownsville, Pennsylvania, US
- Died: October 2, 1889 (aged 50) Atchison, Kansas, US
- Party: Republican
- Spouse: Ida Challiss
- Profession: newspaper editor, abolitionist, politician, soldier

Military service
- Rank: Brevet Brigadier General USV

John Alexander Martin (March 10, 1839 – October 2, 1889) was the tenth governor of Kansas.

== Origins ==
Martin was born in Brownsville, Pennsylvania, a son of James and Jane Montgomery (Crawford) Martin. His father was a native of Maryland, and his mother a native of Pennsylvania. He was of Scots-Irish extraction, and the family was related to General Richard Montgomery. His maternal grandfather, Thomas Brown, was the founder of Brownsville, Pennsylvania. Among Martin's relatives was nephew Harry Alexander Smith, a US Army major general, who was the son of Martin's sister Anna. Martin was educated in the public schools and, at the age of fifteen, began learning the printer's trade. He spent a brief time in Pittsburgh, where he worked as a compositor in the office of the Commercial Journal.

== Freedom's Champion ==
In 1857, at the age of 18, he came to the Kansas Territory, bought the newspaper known as the Squatter Sovereign, published at Atchison, and changed the name to Freedom's Champion. He continued to publish this paper until his death. He was a firm free-state man and soon became actively identified with the political affairs of the territory. In 1858 he was nominated for the territorial legislature, but declined because he was not yet of legal age. In 1859 he was a delegate to the Osawatomie convention which organized the Republican party in Kansas, and for the remainder of his life he was an unswerving supporter of the principles and policies of that organization. His intelligent activity in political affairs led to his being honored by election or appointment to various positions of trust and responsibility. On July 5, 1859, he was elected secretary of the Wyandotte constitutional convention; was secretary of the railroad convention at Topeka in October, 1860; was a delegate to the Republican national convention of that year, and was elected to the Kansas Senate in 1861.

== Civil War service ==
Before the expiration of his term as senator the Civil War broke out, and in October 1861, he was mustered into the United States volunteer service as lieutenant colonel of the 8th Kansas Volunteer Infantry. Early in 1862 he was appointed provost marshal of Leavenworth and held the position until his regiment was ordered to Corinth, Mississippi in March. There the 8th Kansas Infantry became a part of Maj. Gen. Don Carlos Buell's army, and it remained in the Army of the Cumberland until the close of the war. On November 1, 1862, Martin was promoted to colonel, and a few weeks later was assigned to duty as provost marshal of Nashville, Tennessee, which position he filled until the following June. With his command he took part in the Battle of Perryville; the various engagements of the Tullahoma Campaign; the battle of Chickamauga, where on the second day he was assigned to the command of the Third Brigade, First Division, XX Corps; and in November was present at the siege of Chattanooga and the Battle of Missionary Ridge. With Maj. Gen. William Tecumseh Sherman's army he marched to Atlanta in the memorable campaign of 1864, the line of march being marked by engagements at Rocky Face Ridge, Dalton, Resaca, Kingston, Kennesaw Mountain and various other points. After the fall of Atlanta, Martin's regiment joined in the pursuit of Lt. Gen. John Bell Hood as he marched northward into Tennessee, where it closed its service. During the closing scenes of his military career Martin commanded the First Brigade, Third Division, IV Corps, until he was mustered out at Pulaski, Tennessee on November 17, 1864. He later received a brevet of brigadier general "for gallant and meritorious services", dated March 13, 1865.

== After the war ==
Returning to Kansas, Martin resumed the editorial management of his paper, and again became a factor in political affairs. He served as a member of the Kansas Senate from 1859 to 1861, and was mayor of Atchison, serving in 1865 and 1878 to 1880. He served as the third Atchison postmaster for twelve years. For twenty-five consecutive years he was chairman of the Atchison County Republican Central Committee; was a member of the Republican National Committee from 1868 to 1884, and secretary of the committee during the last four years of that period; served as a delegate to the first Republican Convention in 1860, and was a member of the 1860, 1868, 1872, and 1880 Republican National Conventions; was a member of one of the vice-presidents of the United States Centennial commission; was one of the founders of the Kansas Historical Society, of which he was president in 1878; was president the same year of the Editors' and Publishers' Association; and from 1878 to the time of his death was one of the board of managers of the Leavenworth branch of the National Soldiers' Home. During all the years following the Civil War he manifested a keen interest in the work and welfare of the Grand Army of the Republic, and when the Department of Kansas was organized, he was honored by being elected its first commander.

== Governor Martin ==
For years before his election to the office of Governor, Martin had an ambition to be the chief executive of his adopted state, but knew he had to wait and prepare himself for the duties of the office in case he should be called to fill it. The call came in 1884, when he was nominated and elected. The beginning of his administration was very difficult, and he was besieged by hordes of office-seekers. This, on account of the previous Democratic administration.

At first Martin was not a prohibitionist, but in time, as he saw the beneficial effects of prohibition, he became converted to be one of its most ardent champions. During Martin's administration six educational institutions were established in Kansas, and 182 school houses were built in 1887. Also, the State Reformatory was located at Hutchinson, and opportunities for reform were provided for young law-breakers.

In March 1886, a strike and serious disturbances on the Missouri Pacific Railroad, in Missouri and Kansas, demanded Martin's attentions. Rioting caused him to send the First Kansas Militia to the scene of action. After being the cause of great inconveniences and suffering, the strike was settled in April.

His first administration commended him to the people, and in 1886 he was reelected.

A bill was passed by the Kansas Legislature of 1887, conferring on women of Kansas the right to vote at school, bond, and municipal elections. This was one of the first steps toward the complete suffrage the State enjoys today.

Kansas had steadily progressed in prosperity and her towns and broad farming lands had increased immensely in value. This led to a "boom" during which cities were erected on paper and real towns increased in size. Many syndicates were organized to deal in Kansas real estate. Long blocks of buildings were erected in unnecessary towns, and the prairie was long after dotted with rusting pipes and hydrants, the only tangible evidences of these useless towns. The end of 1888 saw the great Kansas "boom" collapse, and, as this year had also had a failure of crops, Kansas experienced a panic. But this check in prosperity was comparatively brief.

There was a contest for the county seat between towns in several counties. Bitter rivalries and feuds resulted, the worst being the Stevens County, where several people were killed. On an appeal made to the Governor for help, and a militia regiment was sent to the county. In 1888 Greeley County was organized, thus completing the organization of Kansas' 105 present counties.

== Marriage and death ==
On June 7, 1871, Martin married Ida Challiss, and together they had seven children.

Martin died from pneumonia on October 2, 1889, in Atchison at the age of 50, and was interred in Atchison's Mount Vernon Cemetery.

== See also ==
- Gray County War

== Sources ==
- Frank W. Blackmar, ed. (1912). "Martin, John Alexander". Kansas: a cyclopedia of state history, embracing events, institutions, industries, counties, cities, towns, prominent persons, etc ... Vol. II. Chicago: Standard Pub Co. pp. 233–235. Archived from the original on August 20, 2004.
- Sobel, Robert; John Raimo, eds. (1978). "John Martin, governor of Kansas". Biographical Directory of the Governors of the United States, 1789–1978. Vol. 2. Westport, Conn.: Meckler Books.
- The Political Graveyard
- The KSGenWeb Project
- National Governors Association

Party political offices
Preceded by John St. John	Republican nominee for Governor of Kansas; 1884, 1886	Succeeded by Lyman U. Humphrey
Political offices
Preceded by George W. Glick	Governor of Kansas; 1885–1889	Succeeded by Lyman U. Humphrey
