= George T. Anthony =

American politician

George Tobey Anthony
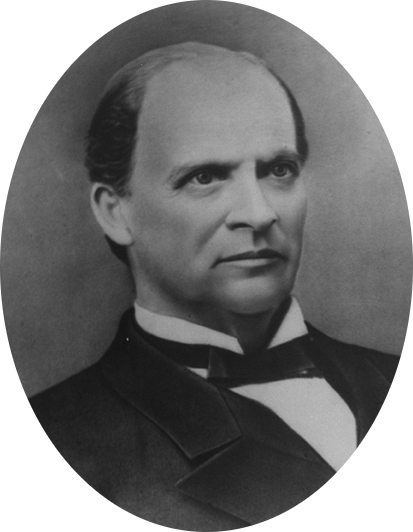
- Anthony circa 1870–1880

7th Governor of Kansas
- In office January 8, 1877 – January 13, 1879
- Lieutenant: Lyman U. Humphrey
- Preceded by: Thomas A. Osborn
- Succeeded by: John St. John

Personal details
- Born: June 9, 1824 Mayfield, New York, US
- Died: August 5, 1896 (aged 72) Topeka, Kansas, US
- Party: Republican
- Spouse: Rosa A. Lyon
- Profession: tinsmith, hardware salesman, loan commissioner, soldier, newspaper editor, IRS collector

George Tobey Anthony (June 9, 1824 – August 5, 1896) was the seventh governor of Kansas, and was a second cousin of suffragette Susan B. Anthony.

== Biography ==
Anthony was born to Quakers on a farm outside the town of Mayfield, New York. His father died when he was five, and Anthony had to work to support himself, his mother, and his siblings. Anthony ran a hardware store, was married to Rosa Lyon. and served as a county loan commissioner before serving in the American Civil War as a captain (brevetted major) of the 17th New York Independent Battery.

Anthony organized the Seventeenth Independent Battery of Light Artillery; and was commissioned captain when it was mustered into the U. S. Army on August 26, 1862. Attached to the 18th Corps, he was with the 24th Corps in the Appomattox Campaign which ended when General Robert E. Lee surrendered.

Anthony was brevetted a Major by the time he was discharged in June 1865. He moved to Leavenworth, Kansas, where he became the editor of several newspapers. He then held a few positions in internal revenue and was placed on the state board of agriculture.

Anthony was elected governor of Kansas in 1876. As governor, Anthony was known for penny-pinching, and favored programs that did not cost the state much money. During Anthony's term, he was the first Kansas governor to read his message to the state legislature, the state's first telephone was installed, the town of Anthony, Kansas was named for him, and the Last Indian Raid in the state occurred near Fort Dodge. He was not re-elected in 1879. In retirement the former governor farmed and invested.

Anthony suffered from diabetes and died from pneumonia in 1896. He became one of four governors buried in Topeka Cemetery and is interred not far from his predecessor Thomas A. Osborn.

Party political offices
Preceded by Thomas A. Osborn	Republican nominee for Governor of Kansas; 1876	Succeeded by John St. John
Political offices
Preceded by Thomas A. Osborn	Governor of Kansas; 1877–1879	Succeeded by John P. St. John
