= Charles L. Robinson =

American politician (1818–1894)

Charles Robinson
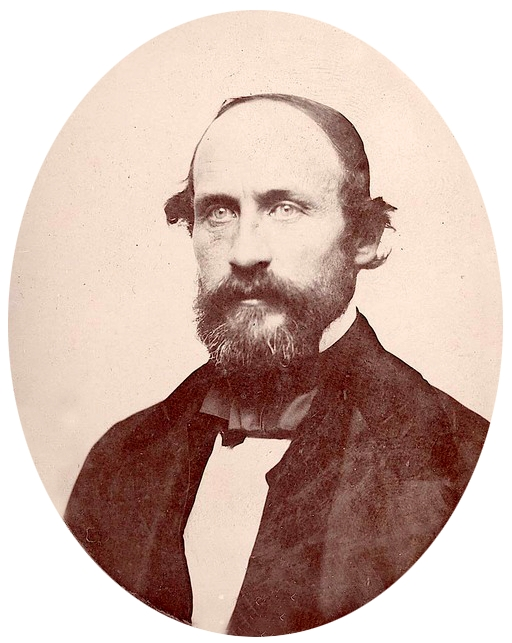

1st Governor of Kansas
- In office February 9, 1861 – January 12, 1863
- Lieutenant: Joseph Pomeroy Root
- Preceded by: Samuel Medary (Kansas Territory)
- Succeeded by: Thomas Carney

Member of the Kansas Senate
- In office 1873–1881

Member of the California Assembly from the 12th district
- In office 1851–1852

Personal details
- Born: July 21, 1818 Hardwick, Massachusetts, U.S.
- Died: August 17, 1894 (aged 76) Lawrence, Kansas, U.S.
- Party: Whig (before 1852); Republican (1852–1890); Democratic (1890–1894)
- Spouse(s): Sarah Adams; Sara Lawrence
- Education: Amherst College (BS); Berkshire Medical College (MD)

Charles Lawrence Robinson (July 21, 1818 – August 17, 1894) was an American politician who served in the California State Assembly from 1851 to 1852, and later as the first governor of Kansas from 1861 until 1863. Throughout his political career, he was a member of the Whig, Republican, and Democratic parties. He was also the first governor of a US state to be impeached by a state legislature, although he was found not guilty during a subsequent State Senate impeachment trial and was not removed from office. After his time as governor he served in the Kansas Senate from 1873 to 1881. He ran again for governor in 1890 but was unsuccessful in his attempt. To date, he is the only governor of Kansas to be impeached.

== Early life and education ==
Born in Hardwick, Massachusetts, in 1818, Robinson remained in the state for his early life. Robinson was educated at Hadley and Amherst academies, and at Amherst College. He studied medicine in Woodstock, Vermont, and later in Pittsfield, Massachusetts, where he earned his medical degree at the Berkshire Medical College in 1843. He practiced medicine in Belchertown, Springfield, and Fitchburg, Massachusetts. While in Springfield, he opened a private hospital. Robinson left Massachusetts for California in the Spring of 1849 after gold was discovered there.

== Early career ==
=== California ===
After traveling to California in 1849, Robinson remained there for two years. He became heavily involved in a dispute between land speculators and squatters; he took the side of the squatters and was their figurehead. After one specific conflict between the land speculators and squatters, the Mayor of Sacramento died and Robinson was injured. Robinson was imprisoned for the death of the Mayor of Sacramento but was elected to the California State Legislature during his imprisonment. He was acquitted of the accused crime. As a state assemblyman, he took charge in pushing for the election of John C. Fremont to the United States Senate. He represented California's 12th State Assembly district from 1851 to 1852. He returned to Massachusetts in 1851 and remained until June 1854.

=== Kansas ===
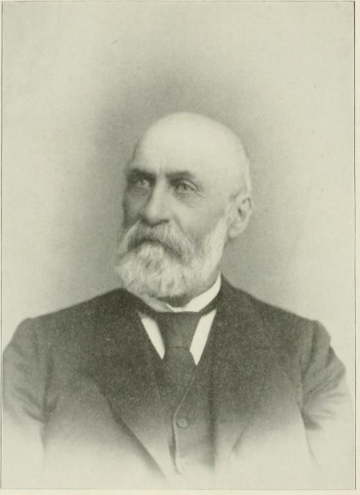
Charles Lawrence Robinson

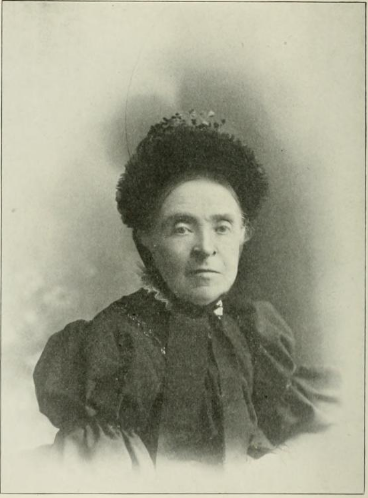
Sara Tappan Doolittle Robinson

In 1854, Robinson happened to attend a meeting at which Eli Thayer of the New England Emigrant Aid Company spoke about the need to oppose slavery. After the speech, the two were introduced to one another. Thayer took an immediate liking to Robinson and asked him to act as the New England Emigrant Aid Company's official financial agent, to which Robinson agreed. In June of that year, Robinson went to Kansas Territory with Charles Branscomb to find suitable land upon which the Emigrant Aid Society could found a town dedicated to the free state cause. Robinson's efforts eventually led to the founding of Lawrence, Kansas.

== Personal life ==
Robinson first married Sarah Adams in East Brookfield, Massachusetts, in 1843. They had two children together, but she died soon after they married in 1846. Later, Robinson married Sara Lawrence on October 3, 1851, daughter of Massachusetts politician Myron Lawrence. Mrs. Robinson was an author and she published Kansas, its Exterior and Interior Life (Boston, 1856), in which she describes the scenes, actors, and events of the struggle between the friends and foes of slavery in Kansas.

== First Governor of Kansas ==
During the Bleeding Kansas period of the 1850s, Robinson became a leader of the antislavery Free State movement. Believing that proslavery Border Ruffians had crossed over from Missouri and fraudulently elected the territorial legislature, Robinson helped organize an alternative Kansas government. In March 1856 he became Free State governor of Kansas under the antislavery Topeka Constitution, recognized by the antislavery Republican Party, but declared illegal by Democratic President Franklin Pierce. In May, Robinson was indicted for treason and arrested in Missouri. Along with other Free State leaders, including John Brown, Jr., the son of abolitionist John Brown, he was held in custody until September by territorial officials.

=== Impeachment ===
In 1861, Robinson took office as governor of the newly admitted State of Kansas and served one term from February 9, 1861, to January 12, 1863. In 1861, the Kansas House of Representatives impeached him along with Secretary of State J. W. Robinson and State Auditor George S. Hillyer for alleged mishandling of bond sale to fund the raising of troops in support of the Union cause. Robinson was found not guilty in his impeachment trial before the State Senate, but it hurt his political career (both J. W. Robinson and Hillyer were found guilty and removed from office).

Robinson's impeachment resulted from a political rivalry with James H. Lane, the first U.S. Senator from Kansas. Lane used his influence in the state capital to try to remove Robinson as governor; both Lane and Robinson sought political power in Kansas.

==== Rivalry with James Lane ====
James H. Lane and Charles Robinson were both staunch opponents of slavery when Kansas was becoming a state, and they came to know each other well. While Robinson was the Governor of Kansas, Lane was a U.S. Senator from Kansas. Lane led a Brigade in Missouri against Confederates in the town of Osceola in 1861. Robinson became opposed to Lane because he believed it was the role of the governor to form Kansas’s military forces, not Lane, a Senator. Their feud also came about because of Robinson’s view that Lane’s actions in Missouri were going to cause war.

== Run for Governor in 1890 ==
Robinson ran again for governor of Kansas in 1890, nearly 30 years after serving as the first governor of the state and after serving for many years in the Kansas State Senate. However, this time he was running as a Democrat rather than as a Republican. He was nominated by the Democratic Party and endorsed by resubmission Republicans. He gained strong support from opponents of the prohibition of alcohol. Robinson ran against incumbent Governor Humphrey of the Republican Party.

== Later life ==
Elected to the Kansas State Senate, Robinson served from 1873 to 1881. He served as president of the Kansas Historical Society from 1879 to 1880. Later, he became a Superintendent of the Haskell Institute and served from 1887 to 1889, and he was regent of the University of Kansas for twelve years, resigning due to health concerns.

== Legacy ==
Robinson died on August 17, 1894, at his home due to sickness and is buried in Oak Hill Cemetery in Lawrence, Kansas. Robinson is remembered for his efforts in making Kansas a free-state. His name was found inscribed on the Kansas House Chamber, alongside other Kansas abolitionists, after the chamber was restored.

Party political offices
First	Republican nominee for Governor of Kansas; 1859	Succeeded by Thomas Carney
Preceded by H. P. Vrooman	Greenback nominee for Governor of Kansas; 1882	Succeeded by H. L. Phillips
Preceded by John Martin	Democratic nominee for Governor of Kansas; 1890	Vacant Title next held by David Overmyer; 1894
Political offices
Preceded by Samuel Medary as Governor of the Kansas Territory	Governor of Kansas; 1861–1863	Succeeded by Thomas Carney
