= Samuel J. Crawford =

American politician (1835–1913)

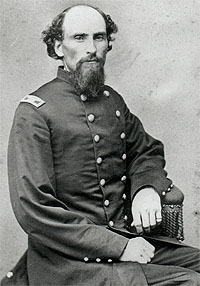

3rd Governor of Kansas
- In office January 9, 1865 – November 4, 1868
- Lieutenant: James McGrew; Nehemiah Green
- Preceded by: Thomas Carney
- Succeeded by: Nehemiah Green

Personal details
- Born: April 10, 1835 Lawrence County, Indiana, US
- Died: October 21, 1913 (aged 78) Topeka, Kansas, US
- Party: Republican
- Spouse: Isabel Marshall Chase
- Profession: attorney, politician, soldier, real estate

Military service
- Allegiance: United States: Union
- Branch/service: Union Army; United States Army
- Rank: Colonel; Brevet Brigadier General
- Commands: 2nd Kansas Colored Infantry Regiment; 19th Kansas Cavalry Regiment
- Battles/wars: American Civil War; American Indian Wars

Samuel Johnson Crawford (April 10, 1835 – October 21, 1913) was a Union Army officer during the American Civil War, and the third governor of Kansas (1865–1868). He also served as one of the first members of the Kansas Legislature.

== Early life ==
Crawford was born in Lawrence County, Indiana, and grew up on a farm while he attended school in Bedford, Indiana. He later attended law school at Cincinnati College. His parents were William and Jane (Morrow) Crawford, who were natives of North Carolina and had moved to Indiana Territory in 1815. His paternal grandparents were James and Mary (Fraser) Crawford, his grandfather having been a Revolutionary soldier.

== Arrival in Kansas ==
Samuel J. Crawford arrived in Kansas Territory and began the practice of law at Garnett, Kansas, on March 1, 1859. In May of the same year of his arrival he attended the Osawatomie Convention and participated in the organization of the Republican Party in Kansas. In September of the same year he was a delegate to the Republican state convention at Topeka, which placed in nomination state officers under the Wyandotte Constitution.

In November 1859, he was elected a member of the first state Legislature, and assisted in putting the state government into operation.

== Military career ==
Toward the close of the first session the country was involved in war. He resigned his legislative seat to become captain in the 2nd Kansas Infantry. He participated in the 1861 Southwest Missouri campaign led by General Lyon, and took part in all the engagements, including the crucial Battle of Wilson's Creek. In March 1862, Crawford was assigned command of Company A, 2nd Kansas Cavalry, and later commanded of a battalion in the same regiment.

With the 2nd Kansas Cavalry he was with General James G. Blunt in Southwest Missouri, Arkansas, and Indian Territory until early in the fall of 1862. During that time he participated in the battles of Newtonia, Old Fort Wayne, Cane Hill, Bald Peak, Cove Creek, Prairie Grove and Van Buren. At Old Fort Wayne he led his battalion in the charge which resulted in the capture of an entire battery of artillery.

On March 12, 1863, he was assigned command of the 2nd Kansas Cavalry and soon afterward joined Blunt at Fort Gibson for an expedition south through the Choctaw Nation. This campaign ended with the taking of Fort Smith, Arkansas, and Colonel Crawford was instrumental in capturing a number of prisoners, wagons, horses, a Confederate paymaster and $40,000 of Confederate money.

In November 1863, he was appointed colonel of the 2nd Kansas (Colored) Infantry (later the 83rd U.S. Colored Troops). His regiment participated in the Camden Expedition and performed admirably in the Battle of Jenkins' Ferry where it relieved an Indiana regiment and captured a rebel artillery battery consisting of three guns. In March 1864, he joined General Frederick Steele on an expedition to the Red River under the general command of General Nathaniel Banks. At Jenkins Ferry his command lost heavily and his own horse was shot.

== Governor ==
While still in active service, on September 8, 1864, Crawford was nominated for governor of Kansas. On October 1 he was granted a leave of absence, the first he had had since entering the service at the beginning of the war. However, on arriving in Kansas learned of Price's Missouri Raid. Instead of entering the canvass for office, he at once reported to and was assigned to the staff of General Samuel R. Curtis. For meritorious services on the field of battle he was brevetted Brigadier General on March 13, 1865.

On November 8, 1864, he was elected governor, and on January 9, 1865, took the oath of office; on September 5, 1866, he became the first person to be re-elected governor of Kansas.

Governor Crawford resigned on November 4, 1868, to take command of the 19th Kansas Cavalry Regiment which was to join the 7th United States Cavalry in the Custer-Sheridan Winter Campaign of 1868–1869.

== Retirement ==
After retiring from the governorship Crawford was in the real estate business at Emporia, Kansas, until 1876, when he moved to Topeka to undertake the prosecution of certain claims against the United States for indemnity school lands, and in this he rendered much aid to Kansas. Subsequently, he moved to Washington, D.C., and practiced law there for a number of years. Among other activities Crawford published Kansas in the '60s, a work which attracted much attention as a picture of conditions in early Kansas history.

On December 1, 1870, he formed the Florence Town Company. It was a group of men who learned of the proposed route of the Atchison, Topeka and Santa Fe Railway who decided on a town site where the railroad would cross the Cottonwood River. He named the town, Florence, in honor of his daughter.

== Legacy ==
Samuel J. Crawford is the namesake of Crawford County, Kansas. Many cities in Kansas also have streets named after Crawford.

== See also ==
- List of American Civil War brevet generals (Union)

== Notes ==
Party political offices
Preceded by Thomas Carney	Republican nominee for Governor of Kansas; 1864, 1866	Succeeded by James M. Harvey
Political offices
Preceded by Thomas Carney	Governor of Kansas; 1865–1868	Succeeded by Nehemiah Green
