= 2nd Kansas Infantry Regiment =

- Active: June 20, 1861 – October 31, 1861
- Country: United States
- Allegiance: Union
- Branch: Infantry
- Engagements: American Civil War; Trans-Mississippi Theater; Battle of Wilson's Creek

Commanders
- Notable commanders: Robert B. Mitchell; Charles W. Blair

The 2nd Kansas Infantry Regiment was an infantry regiment that served in the Union Army during the American Civil War. Recruited in May 1861, it formally organized on June 20. Sent into Missouri, it participated in several small actions in the Springfield area before fighting in the Battle of Wilson's Creek on August 10, where it suffered 70 casualties out of about 600 men present excluded a detached cavalry company. Ordered back to Kansas after the battle, it fought in several small actions in Missouri and later mobilized in Kansas after enemy forces captured Lexington, Missouri, as Kansas was believed to be threatened by the Lexington movement. The unit was disbanded on October 31, with some of its men, including its commander, joining the 2nd Kansas Cavalry Regiment. Colonel Robert B. Mitchell commanded the regiment until he was wounded at Wilson's Creek and Lieutenant Colonel Charles W. Blair took command.

== Service ==
=== Formation ===
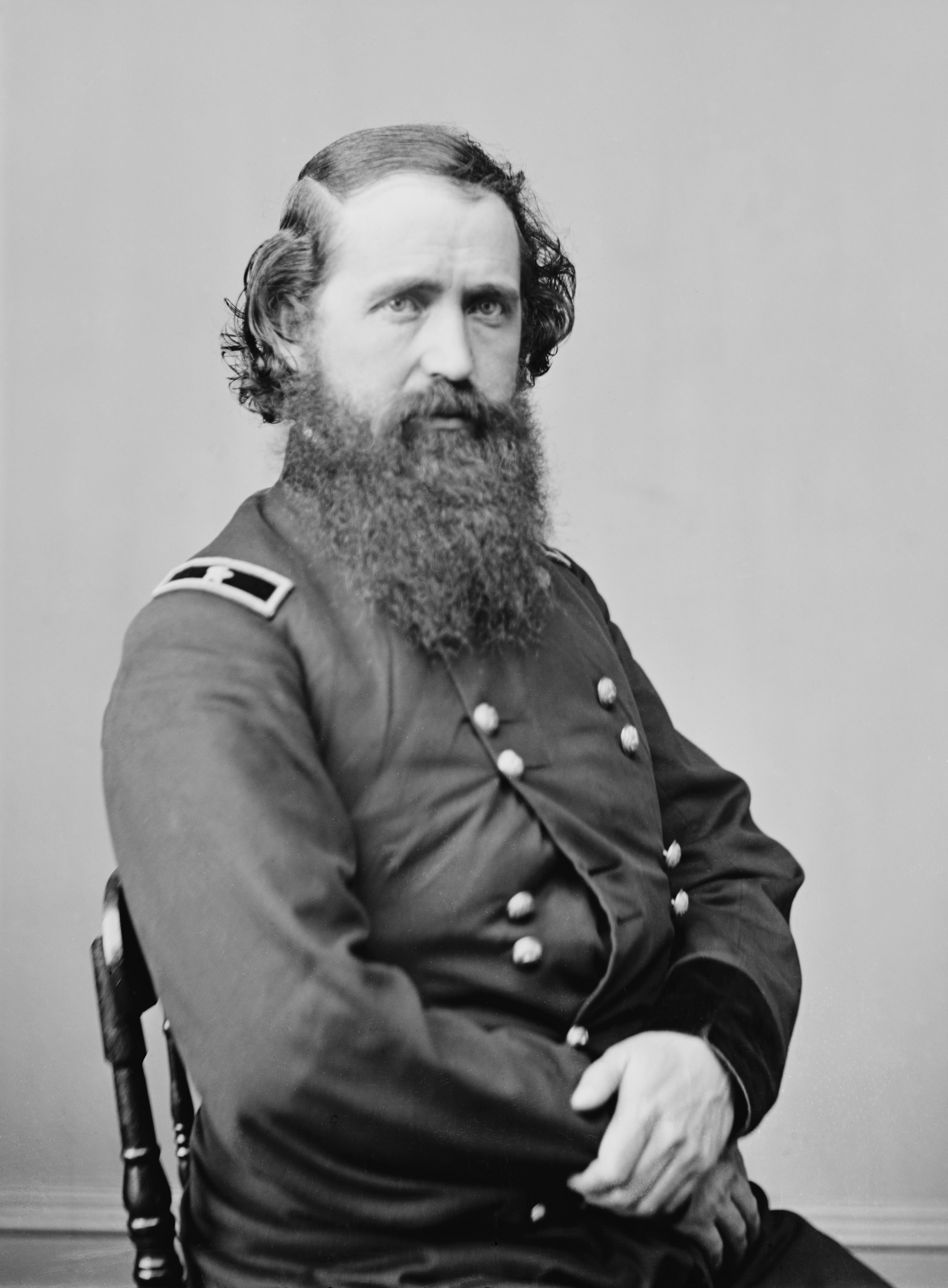
Colonel Robert B. Mitchell, the first commander of the regiment

The 2nd Kansas Infantry Regiment was primarily recruited in May 1861, for service in the Union Army during the American Civil War; the regiment's men were drawn from across the state. It was organized for a service period of 90 days. After gathering at Lawrence, Kansas, the unit entered Union service on June 20. It was commanded by Colonel Robert B. Mitchell, a politician and veteran of the Mexican–American War. Charles W. Blair was lieutenant colonel, and William F. Cloud was the regiment's major. The men of the regiment were provided blue fatigue blouses as uniforms and were armed with a mixture of rifles and outdated smoothbore muskets.

After entering service, the regiment moved from Kansas City, Missouri, to Clinton, Missouri, as part of a force led by Major Samuel Sturgis. Most of Sturgis's column reached Clinton on July 4 and went into camp. Discipline issues in the 2nd Kansas Infantry and the 1st Kansas Infantry Regiment resulted in Sturgis having some of the Kansans whipped, which culminated on July 8 in a confrontation between him and some of the men which Mitchell was forced to break up before it became violent. Joining the forces of Brigadier General Nathaniel Lyon, the regiment marched to the Springfield, Missouri area, via Stockton and Melville. The men trained at a camp in the Springfield area, and the 1st and 2nd Kansas Infantry were brigaded together under the command of Colonel George Washington Deitzler.

=== Wilson's Creek campaign ===
The regiment was part of a strike towards Forsyth, Missouri, beginning on July 20 and led by Captain Thomas W. Sweeny, along with troops from the 1st Iowa Infantry Regiment and elements of an artillery battery and a cavalry regiment. By then, one company of the regiment had been mounted on captured horses. Reaching Forsyth on July 22, the mounted company routed a Missouri State Guard post outside of town, and Sweeny's column engaged more Missouri State Guardsmen outside of town. The Union forces were victorious, and captured supplies in the town before looting Forsyth. Losses were minimal for both sides, with the Union cavalry losing two wounded and the Missouri State Guard one man wounded and two captured. The skirmish at Forsyth was the first combat the regiment had seen. Sweeny's force returned to Springfield on July 25. On August 3, Lyon's force encountered a small Confederate patrol near the Curran Post Office, which was on the county line of Barry County and Stone County and was over 20 miles (32 km) from Springfield, while continuing a movement towards Cassville. Union troops drove them off and the 2nd Kansas Infantry scouted 2 miles (3.2 km) ahead to a location known as either McCulla's Springs or McCullah's store. Lyon later learned that the Missouri State Guard and the Confederates had joined forces and ordered a retreat to Springfield. On August 9, the regiment's mounted company was part of a Union cavalry force that defeated a group of Missouri State Guard cavalry 5 miles (8.0 km) west of Springfield.

That evening, Lyon moved out most of his command from Springfield to attack a Confederate and Missouri State Guard camp along Wilson's Creek. Lyon divided his force into two columns for the August 10 Battle of Wilson's Creek, with the second column under Colonel Franz Sigel to attack from the opposite direction of Lyon's men. The 2nd Kansas Infantry was part of Lyon's column and was initially kept in a reserve role while Union troops occupied a terrain feature known as Bloody Hill at around 6:30 a.m. When a force of Missouri State Guard infantrymen advanced against the hill, Lyon brought the 2nd Kansas forward to the main line, where it deployed next to the 1st Missouri Infantry Regiment. The Confederate attack failed at about 8:00 a.m. and was followed by a lull in the fighting.

With another enemy attack ongoing, Lyon led the 2nd Kansas Infantry to another part of the line on Bloody Hill. As the fighting continued, Confederate fire killed Lyon and wounded Mitchell. Command of the regiment fell to Blair. The attackers eventually withdrew. When a Confederate cavalry force attempted to strike the Union flank, a company detached from the 2nd Kansas as skirmishers and the mounted company helped repulse it. Sturgis took command of Lyon's column, but Sigel's attack had already been defeated. Another Confederate/Missouri State Guard attack, the third against Bloody Hill, was made but was repulsed. During the fighting, the 2nd Kansas exchanged fire with the 3rd Regiment, Arkansas State Troops. Around the time the attackers withdrew, Sturgis ordered a withdrawal from the field. The 2nd Kansas, low on ammunition, fell back in good order at about 11:30 a.m. Excluding the mounted company, the 2nd Kansas had taken about 600 men into the fight and had lost 5 men killed, 59 wounded, and 6 missing.

=== End of service ===
After the battle, the Union troops fell back to Springfield, and then moved to Rolla and St. Louis. Ordered back to Kansas for its exit from Union service, the regiment halted at Hannibal, Missouri, on August 31, where half of the regiment joined part of the 3rd Iowa Infantry Regiment on an expedition to Paris, Missouri, where a skirmish was fought on September 2, driving the enemy out of the area. During the return march, on September 4, the men of the Paris expedition fought a small action at Shelbina, Missouri, with the officers of the 2nd Kansas deciding to withdraw to Macon. At Macon, Brigadier General Stephen A. Hurlbut ordered the regiment to return to Shelbina, but Blair cited his earlier orders to go to Kansas and continued moving. After a brief halt at Bloomfield to guard stores, the regiment continued on and fought minor actions at St. Joseph, Missouri, and Iatan, Missouri. The unit arrived at Leavenworth, Kansas, but was deployed to Wyandotte County, Kansas, after enemy forces captured Lexington, Missouri, since Kansas was believed to be threatened. It then returned to Leavenworth, where it completed its time of service. The regiment's service formally ended on October 31. During their time with the regiment, 17 men had died of various causes. Some of the unit's soldiers, including Mitchell, Blair, and Cloud, then served in the 2nd Kansas Cavalry Regiment.

== See also ==
- List of Kansas Civil War units
- Kansas in the American Civil War

== Sources ==
- Bearss, Ed (1975). The Battle of Wilson's Creek. George Washington Carver Birthplace District Association.
- Dyer, Frederick H. (1908). A Compendium of the War of the Rebellion. Des Moines, Iowa: Dyer Publishing Company.
- Huff, Leo E. (1996). "The Struggle for Missouri: Lyon's Campaign and the Battle of Wilson's Creek". In Elkins, Kenneth (ed.). Hard Times/Hard War. Republic, Missouri: Wilson's Creek National Battlefield.
- Official Military History of Kansas Regiments During the War for the Suppression of the Great Rebellion. Leavenworth, Kansas: W. S. Burke. 1870.
- Piston, William Garrett; Hatcher, Richard W. (2000). Wilson's Creek: The Second Battle of the Civil War and the Men Who Fought It. Chapel Hill, North Carolina: University of North Carolina Press. ISBN 0-8078-2515-8.
- The War of the Rebellion: A Compilation of the Official Records of the Union and Confederate Armies. Washington, D.C.: Government Printing Office. 1902 [1881].
