= Solon O. Thacher =

American politician

Solon Otis Thacher (August 31, 1830 – August 11, 1895) was an American lawyer, judge, and politician. His former home in Lawrence, Kansas, is considered a historic location.

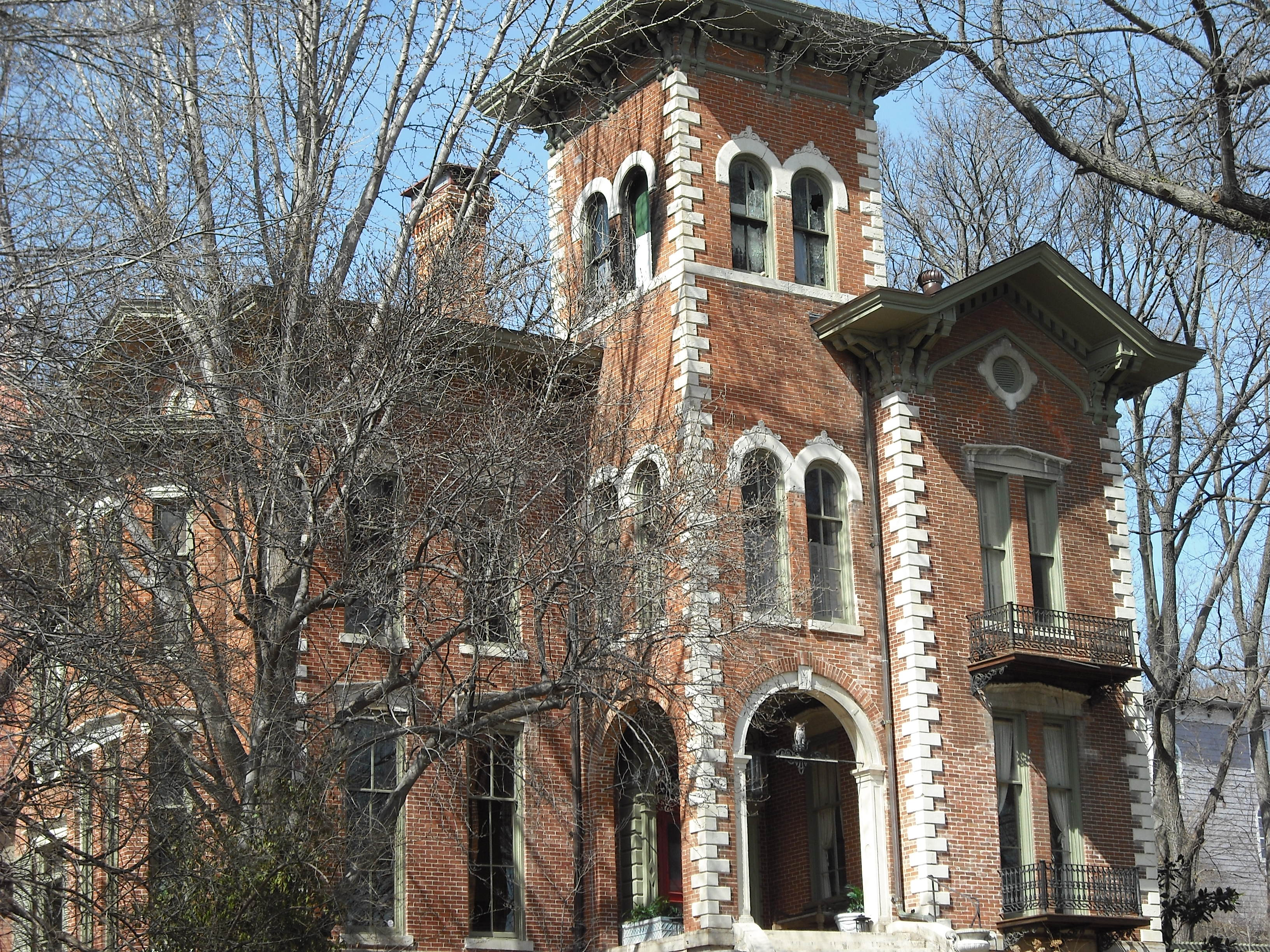
Ludington-Thacher House at 1613 Tennessee

Born in Hornellsville, New York, Thacher graduated from Union College and Albany Law School. He was admitted to the New York bar in 1856. In 1857, Thacher served in the New York State Assembly. In 1858, Thatcher moved with his wife and family to Lawrence, Kansas. He continued to practice law. He was one of the editors of the Lawrence Republican newspaper. Thacher served on the Wyandotte Constitutional Convention in 1859. From 1859 to 1864, Thacher served as a Kansas District Court judge. In 1864 and 1882 he ran for governor of Kansas and lost the election. In 1881, 1893, and 1895, Thatcher served in the Kansas State Senate and was a Republican. In 1883, Thacher served on a diplomatic mission to South America. Thacher served as a regent for the Kansas State University and as president of the Kansas Historical Society. He died at his home in Lawrence, Kansas.
