= Thomas Carney =

American politician

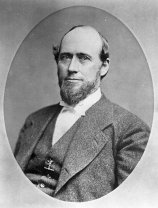

2nd Governor of Kansas
- In office January 12, 1863 – January 9, 1865
- Lieutenant: Thomas Andrew Osborn
- Preceded by: Charles L. Robinson
- Succeeded by: Samuel J. Crawford

Personal details
- Born: August 20, 1824 Delaware County, Ohio, U.S.
- Died: July 28, 1888 (aged 63) Leavenworth, Kansas, U.S.
- Party: Republican
- Spouse: Rebecca Canaday

Thomas Carney (August 20, 1824 – July 28, 1888) was the second governor of Kansas.

== Biography ==
Carney was born in Delaware County, Ohio, to James and Jane Carney. James died in 1828, leaving a widow and four young sons. Thomas remained at home farming with his mother until age 19. He was educated in Berkshire, Ohio, where he lived with an uncle. He worked in mercantile businesses and finally established a successful wholesale business in Leavenworth, Kansas. The year he was elected to the state legislature, he married Rebecca Ann Cannady.

== Career ==
After his term as State Representative, Carney was elected Governor of Kansas and served from 1863 through 1865. During his tenure, he devoted his efforts to developing the state and addressing the issues caused by the Civil War. He was elected Mayor of Leavenworth in 1865. A founder of the First National Bank of Leavenworth, he also served as Director of the Lawrence and Fort Gibson Railroad Company.

Carney was contemplating a run for the US Senate in 1871, when he admitted that he had accepted $15,000 from Republican senatorial candidate, Alexander Caldwell to leave the race and thereby allow Caldwell's election in 1871.

He continued in business until 1875.

== Death ==
Carney died on July 28, 1888, in Leavenworth, Kansas, from apoplexy, and is buried there in Mount Muncie Cemetery.

== See also ==
- List of mayors of Leavenworth, Kansas

Party political offices
Preceded by Charles L. Robinson	Republican nominee for Governor of Kansas; 1862	Succeeded by Samuel J. Crawford
Political offices
Preceded by Charles L. Robinson	Governor of Kansas; 1863–1865	Succeeded by Samuel J. Crawford
