= List of United States senators in the 43rd Congress =

This is a complete list of United States senators during the 43rd United States Congress listed by seniority from March 4, 1873, to March 3, 1875.

Order of service is based on the commencement of the senator's first term. Behind this is former service as a senator (only giving the senator seniority within their new incoming class), service as vice president, a House member, a cabinet secretary, or a governor of a state. The final factor is the population of the senator's state.

Senators who were sworn in during the middle of the Congress (up until the last senator who was not sworn in early after winning the November 1874 election) are listed at the end of the list with no number.

== Terms of service ==
Class	Terms of service of senators that expired in years
Class 1	Terms of service of senators that expired in 1875 (CA, CT, DE, FL, IN, MA, MD, ME, MI, MN, MO, MS, MT, NE, NJ, NV, NY, OH, PA, RI, TN, TX, VA, VT, WI, and WV.)
Class 2	Terms of service of senators that expired in 1877 (AL, AR, DE, GA, IA, IL, KS, KY, LA, MA, ME, MI, MN, MS, MT, NC, NE, NH, NJ, OR, RI, SC, TN, TX, VA, and WV.)
Class 3	Terms of service of senators that expired in 1879 (AL, AR, CA, CT, FL, GA, IA, IL, IN, KS, KY, LA, MD, MO, NC, NH, NV, NY, OH, OR, PA, SC, VT, and WI.)

== U.S. Senate seniority list ==
U.S. Senate seniority
Rank	Senator (party-state)	Seniority date	Other factors
1	Charles Sumner (LR-MA)	April 11, 1851	
2	Zachariah Chandler (R-MI)	March 4, 1857	
3	Henry B. Anthony (R-RI)	March 4, 1859	Former governor
4	Timothy O. Howe (R-WI)	March 4, 1861	
5	John Sherman (R-OH)	March 21, 1861	
6	Alexander Ramsey (R-MN)	March 4, 1863	
7	William Sprague IV (R-RI)	March 4, 1863	
8	William M. Stewart (R-NV)	February 1, 1865	
9	Aaron H. Cragin (R-NH)	March 4, 1865	
10	George F. Edmunds (R-VT)	April 3, 1866	
11	Thomas Tipton (R-NE)	March 1, 1867	
12	Roscoe Conkling (R-NY)	March 4, 1867	
13	Justin Smith Morrill (R-VT)	March 4, 1867	
14	Oliver P. Morton (R-IN)	March 4, 1867	
15	Simon Cameron (R-PA)	March 4, 1867	
16	Orris S. Ferry (R-CT)	March 4, 1867	
17	George E. Spencer (R-AL)	July 13, 1868	
18	Thomas J. Robertson (R-SC)	July 15, 1868	
19	Thomas F. Bayard (D-DE)	March 4, 1869	
20	Hannibal Hamlin (R-ME)	March 4, 1869	
21	Allen G. Thurman (D-OH)	March 4, 1869	
22	Eugene Casserly (D-CA)	March 4, 1869	
23	William A. Buckingham (R-CT)	March 4, 1869	
24	Abijah Gilbert (R-FL)	March 4, 1869	
25	Daniel D. Pratt (R-IN)	March 4, 1869	
26	William T. Hamilton (D-MD)	March 4, 1869	
27	Carl Schurz (R-MO)	March 4, 1869	
28	John P. Stockton (D-NJ)	March 4, 1869	
29	Reuben Fenton (R-NY)	March 4, 1869	
30	John Scott (R-PA)	March 4, 1869	
31	William G. Brownlow (R-TN)	March 4, 1869	
32	Arthur I. Boreman (R-WV)	March 4, 1869	
33	Matthew H. Carpenter (R-WI)	March 4, 1869	
34	Lot M. Morrill (R-ME)	October 30, 1869	
35	John F. Lewis (R-VA)	January 26, 1870	
36	Adelbert Ames (R-MS)	February 23, 1870	
37	James W. Flanagan (R-TX)	March 30, 1870	
38	Morgan C. Hamilton (R-TX)	March 31, 1870	
39	Eli Saulsbury (D-DE)	March 4, 1871	
40	Thomas W. Ferry (R-MI)	March 4, 1871	
41	William Windom (R-MN)	March 4, 1871	Former representative
42	Henry G. Davis (D-WV)	March 4, 1871	
43	George Goldthwaite (D-AL)	March 4, 1871	
44	Powell Clayton (R-AR)	March 4, 1871	
45	John A. Logan (R-IL)	March 4, 1871	
46	George G. Wright (R-IA)	March 4, 1871	
47	John W. Stevenson (D-KY)	March 4, 1871	
48	Joseph R. West (R-LA)	March 4, 1871	
49	Phineas Hitchcock (R-NE)	March 4, 1871	
50	Frederick T. Frelinghuysen (R-NJ)	March 4, 1871	
51	James K. Kelly (D-OR)	March 4, 1871	
52	Henry Cooper (D-TN)	March 4, 1871	
53	Alexander Caldwell (R-KS)	March 4, 1871	
54	John W. Johnston (D-VA)	March 15, 1871	
55	Thomas M. Norwood (D-GA)	November 14, 1871	
56	James L. Alcorn (R-MS)	December 1, 1871	
57	Matt W. Ransom (D-NC)	January 30, 1872	
58	William B. Allison (R-IA)	March 4, 1873	Former representative
59	John P. Jones (R-NV)	March 4, 1873	
60	John Brown Gordon (D-GA)	March 4, 1873	
61	Stephen Wallace Dorsey (R-AR)	March 4, 1873	
62	Aaron A. Sargent (R-CA)	March 4, 1873	
63	Simon B. Conover (R-FL)	March 4, 1873	
64	Richard J. Oglesby (R-IL)	March 4, 1873	
65	Thomas C. McCreery (D-KY)	March 4, 1873	
66	George R. Dennis (D-MD)	March 4, 1873	
67	John J. Ingalls (R-KS)	March 4, 1873	
68	Lewis V. Bogy (D-MO)	March 4, 1873	
69	Bainbridge Wadleigh (R-NH)	March 4, 1873	
70	Augustus S. Merrimon (D-NC)	March 4, 1873	
71	John H. Mitchell (R-OR)	March 4, 1873	
72	John J. Patterson (R-SC)	March 4, 1873	
	George S. Boutwell (R-MA)	March 17, 1873	
	Robert Crozier (R-KS)	November 24, 1873	
	John S. Hager (D-CA)	December 23, 1873	
	Henry R. Pease (R-MS)	February 3, 1874	
	James M. Harvey (R-KS)	February 8, 1874	
	William B. Washburn (R-MA)	April 17, 1874	
	William W. Eaton (D-CT)	February 5, 1875	

== See also ==
- 43rd United States Congress
- List of United States representatives in the 43rd Congress
