= 1891 United States Senate election in Kansas =

- January 28, 1891
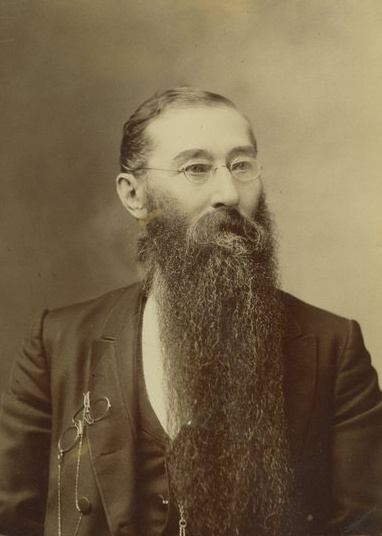

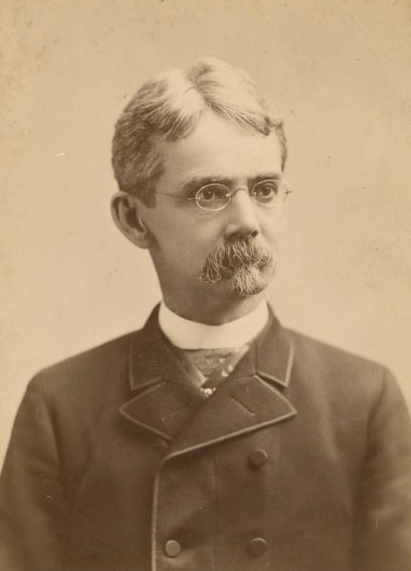
Nominee	William A. Peffer	John James Ingalls
Party	Alliance	Republican
Alliance	Populist
Popular vote	101	58
Percentage	61.21%	35.15%
[[List of United States senators from {{{country}}}|U.S. senator]] before election
John James Ingalls
Republican
Elected U.S. Senator
William A. Peffer
Alliance

The 1891 United States Senate election in Kansas was held on January 28, 1891, to elect Kansas' Class III senator in its delegation.

== Farmers' Alliance/People's nomination ==
The Farmers' Alliance and People's Party were split into two factions that either supported Peter Percival Elder, who was expected to become the Speaker of the Kansas House of Representatives, or William A. Peffer for the senatorial nomination. It was speculated that Jerry Simpson would be chosen as a compromise candidate between the two factions.

On January 27, 1891, the Farmers' Alliance caucus in the state legislature convened to select the party's nominee for the senate election. The balloting started with seventeen candidates and after seventeen ballots Peffer won, with fifty-six votes, against J. T. Willitts, with thirty-eight votes.

=== Candidates ===
- William A. Peffer, judge and member of the Kansas Senate
- Peter Percival Elder, member of the Kansas House of Representatives
- J. T. Willitts

== Results ==
On January 27, 1891, both chambers of the Kansas Legislature informally voted separately on the senatorial candidates. In the House of Representatives, 96 members voted for Peffer, 23 members voted for Ingalls, and 5 members voted for Democratic nominee C. W. Blair. In the Senate, 35 members voted for Ingalls, 1 member voted for Peffer, and 2 voted for other candidates.

On January 28, both chambers of the legislature convened to formally elect the senator. In the join ballot of the House of Representatives and Senate, 101 members voted for Peffer, 58 members voted for Ingalls, 3 members voted for Blair, and 3 members voted for other candidates.

1891 Kansas United States Senate first ballot
Party	Candidate	Votes	%	±%
Alliance	William A. Peffer	98	59.76%	
Republican	John James Ingalls (incumbent)	58	35.37%	
Democratic	C. W. Blair	6	3.66%	
	E. N. Morrill	1	0.61%	
	H. B. Kelley	1	0.61%	
Total votes		164	100.00%	

1891 Kansas United States Senate final ballot
Party	Candidate	Votes	%	±%
Alliance	William A. Peffer	101	61.21%	
Republican	John James Ingalls (incumbent)	58	35.15%	
Democratic	C. W. Blair	3	1.82%	
	E. N. Morrill	1	0.61%	
	H. B. Kelley	1	0.61%	
	Baker	1	0.61%	
Total votes		165	100.00%	

== Endorsements ==
Peffer Endorsements

Organizations

- Jackson County Farmers' Alliance
- Sumner County Farmers' Alliance

Newspapers

- The People's Voice, newspaper of the Farmers' Alliance in Sumner County
