= Nelson Cobb =

American judge (1811–1894)

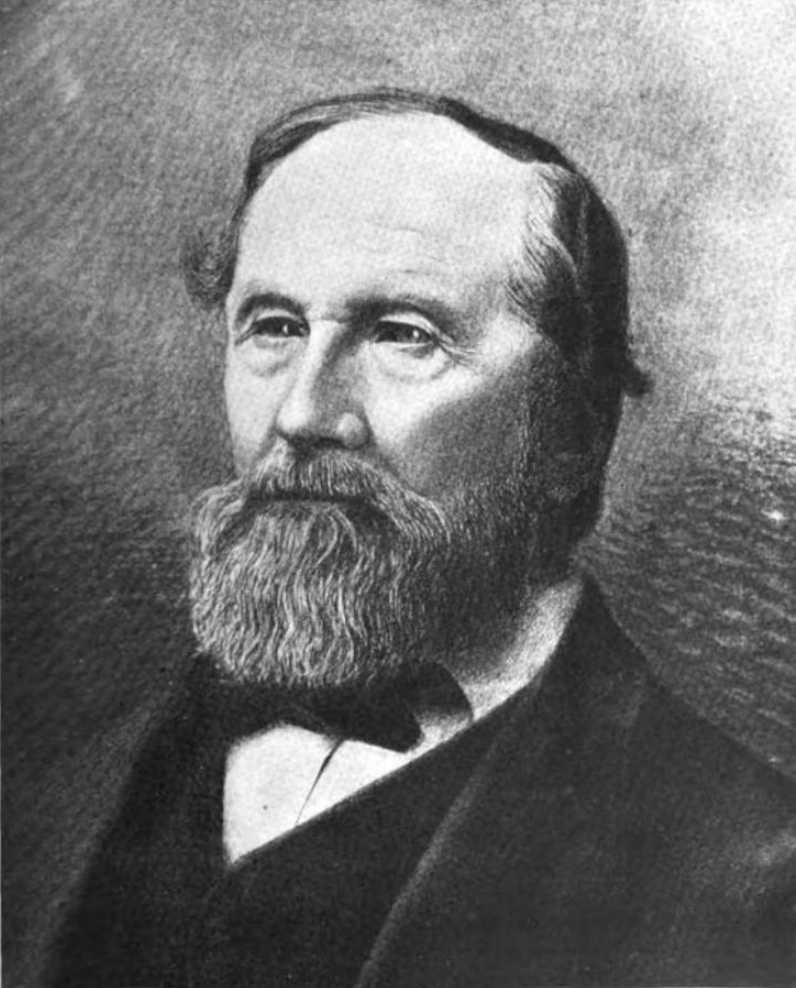
Justice Nelson Cobb

Nelson Cobb (March 19, 1811 – June 16, 1894) was the second chief justice of the Kansas Supreme Court from December 28, 1862, to January 5, 1864.

== Life, education and early career ==
Born March 19, 1811, in Windham, Greene County, New York, Cobb was educated at the common schools, moving with his family moved to Genesee County, New York, in 1826, where he lived on a farm with his father. He read law in Portage, New York, where he was elected commissioner of public schools at the age of 22, and was elected justice of the peace of the village while he was a law student. He was nominated to the position by the democrats and endorsed by the Whigs and was elected with only three votes against him. He gained admission to the bar, and moved to Ellicottville, Cattaraugus County, New York, where he practiced his profession until 1859, serving two terms as county judge. In 1859, Cobb resigned his judgeship and emigrated to the territory of Kansas, first settling at Lawrence, Kansas.

Judge Cobb married Susan E. Baker in 1865, the daughter of Hon. Marsena Baker farmer and member of the New York legislature, they had three daughters together.

Although his age has exempted him from military duty in the American Civil War he joined Captain Cracklin's company and took part in the defence of his home-town. After Lawrence was sacked by William Quantrill a new independent militia company was formed including Cobb as a private, which was subsequently mustered into the state militia.

== Kansas ==
When the current chief justice Thomas Ewing Jr. resigned in 1862 to enter military service, Governor Charles L. Robinson appointed Cobb to be the next Chief Justice after the election of John Hampton Watson to the position was declared void on a technicality. The appointment was until the end of the unexpired term vacated by Judge Ewing with the next election to be held in 1863.

He served on the supreme bench for just over a year from December 28, 1862, to January 5, 1864. While there he wrote the opinions of the court in fifteen cases. His opinions are to be found in the first two volumes of the Kansas State Reports, and were said to "show remarkable powers of accurate analysis, clear and terse expression, exact knowledge of the law, and a high sense of justice".

In the 1863 election he was defeated by Robert Crozier, and although Crozier was constitutionally entitled to hold the position for a six year term the position was actually contended again in 1866 although some moved that this was invalid. Cobb was then nominated in this 1866 election by the National Union state convention, but was defeated, and Samuel Austin Kingman took up the position.

At the expiration of his term Judge Cobb resumed practice in Lawrence with Judge Chadwick until 1868, when he moved with his family to Kansas City, Missouri, and where he resided until his death.

== Missouri ==
On moving to Kansas City he set up in partnership with Col. J.D.S. Cook, and for the first ten years he was engaged in active professional life before retiring from general practice, acting only as occasional counsel in important causes.

While in Kansas City he also lectured on constitutional and statute law at the University of Kansas City. He also served as a special circuit judge on occasions.

== Death and acknowledgment ==
He died June 16, 1894, aged 84 at his home 2535 Oak Street, Kansas City, Missouri (no longer standing). He had lived in Kansas City for over a quarter of a century. He was survived by his wife and three daughters, with his wife living until December 27, 1930, aged 97 and his daughters surviving them both.

On the occasion of his death the Supreme Court of Kansas passed the following resolution and ordered it spread upon the journal of the court:

"Resolved, That in the death of Nelson Cobb, who with honor and distinction presided over this court in the earlier years of its history, we mourn the loss of a good man ani an able jurist—a loss that comes as a profound personal bereavement to those of his professional brethren who had the good fortune to know him. We will ever cherish the memory of the deceased, who, as lawyer, judge, citizen, and neighbor, always had the highest respect and esteem of his fellows"

His most distinguished mental traits were his powers of analysis and expression. He had a remarkable faculty for seizing the essential points of a case, of excluding all that was merely subordinate to the principal question, and bringing the latter into clear light for determination.

Political offices
Preceded by Thomas Ewing Jr. (John Hampton Watson)	Chief Justice of the Kansas Supreme Court; 1862–1864	Succeeded by Robert Crozier
