= Linconia =

Proposed Central American colony

Abraham Lincoln proposed the colonization of the Chiriquí Province, now part of Panama, to create Linconia.

Linconia was the name of a proposed Central American colony suggested by Republican United States Senator Samuel Pomeroy of Kansas in 1862, after U.S. President Abraham Lincoln asked the Senator and United States Secretary of the Interior Caleb Smith to work on a plan to resettle freed African Americans from the United States.

== Background ==
Since his early political career, Abraham Lincoln had supported the American Colonization Society, a controversial group whose goal was the removal of free blacks from the United States. It, and its state affiliates, starting in the 1820s began settlements in West Africa that would eventually unite to form Liberia. Similarly to Linconia, the name of Liberia's capital Monrovia was derived from the name of the fifth President of the United States James Monroe.

Lincoln desired to return former slaves to Africa or other tropical regions, with their consent and the accord of the authorities of the country where they were to be settled. He repeated his support for colonization numerous times, including during the American Civil War.

== The plan ==
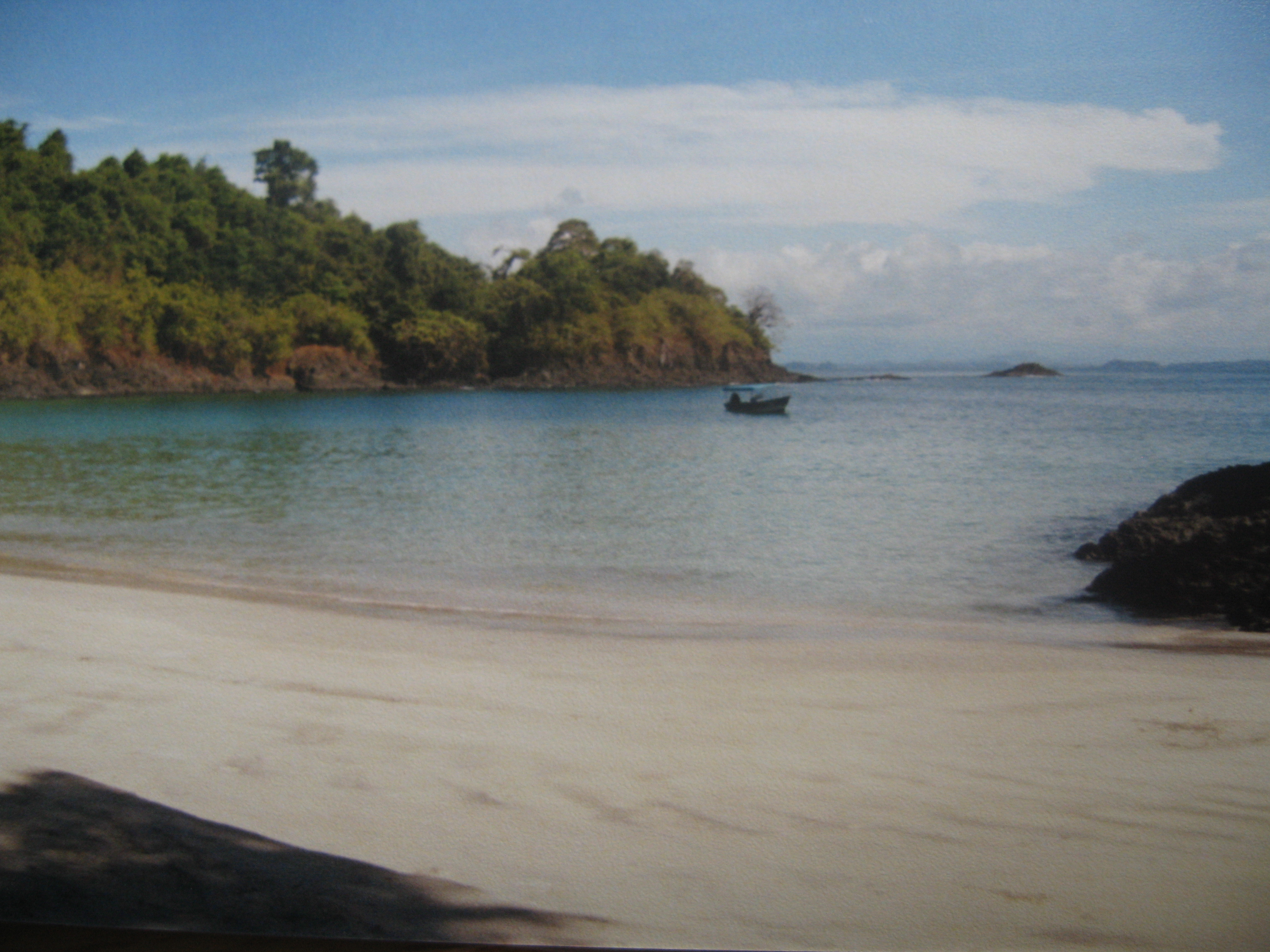
Beach at Gulf of Chiriquí National Marine Park

By 1862, Lincoln had decided that Chiriquí Province, at the time part of the Granadine Confederation but today in Panama, would be an ideal location to start a colony where black people, especially freedmen, could lead better lives than they could in the United States. In August of that year, he invited a group of prominent Africans to the White House to discuss the plan. He stated that the area had "evidence of very rich coal mines...[and] among the finest [harbors] in the world." African Americans, including Frederick Douglass, were in general firmly opposed to emigration, and the delegation similarly reacted negatively. Later that month, The National Republican published an editorial with the title "The Colony of Linconia", which stated that "the necessary arrangements for founding a colony on a grand scale...have been completed", with the project being headed by Senator Pomeroy. Pomeroy proposed that 100 African families travel with him to the site as "pioneers" on October 1. In September, Pomeroy received the permission of the Chiriquí government and landowner Ambrose W. Thompson of the Chiriquí Improvement Company.

However, the Central American nations of Costa Rica, Nicaragua, and Honduras felt threatened, and informed Washington that they opposed this plan. Costa Rica had territorial claims in Chiriquí, and made a formal complaint. The "representatives of Central America" also considered Pomeroy's plan to be an example of filibustering, "à la Walker". United States Secretary of State William H. Seward informed these nations that no plan would continue without their consent, but Lincoln continued to push the plan forward. By late September, after being advised by Seward of the growing international outrage from the Central American nations, Lincoln decided to abandon the idea, angering Pomeroy, who had already found 500 "pioneers."

== See also ==
- Île-à-Vache, the site of another Civil War-era colonization effort
- Proposed United States annexation of Santo Domingo during Reconstruction
- Back-to-Africa movement
