= Samuel C. Pomeroy =

American politician (1816–1891)

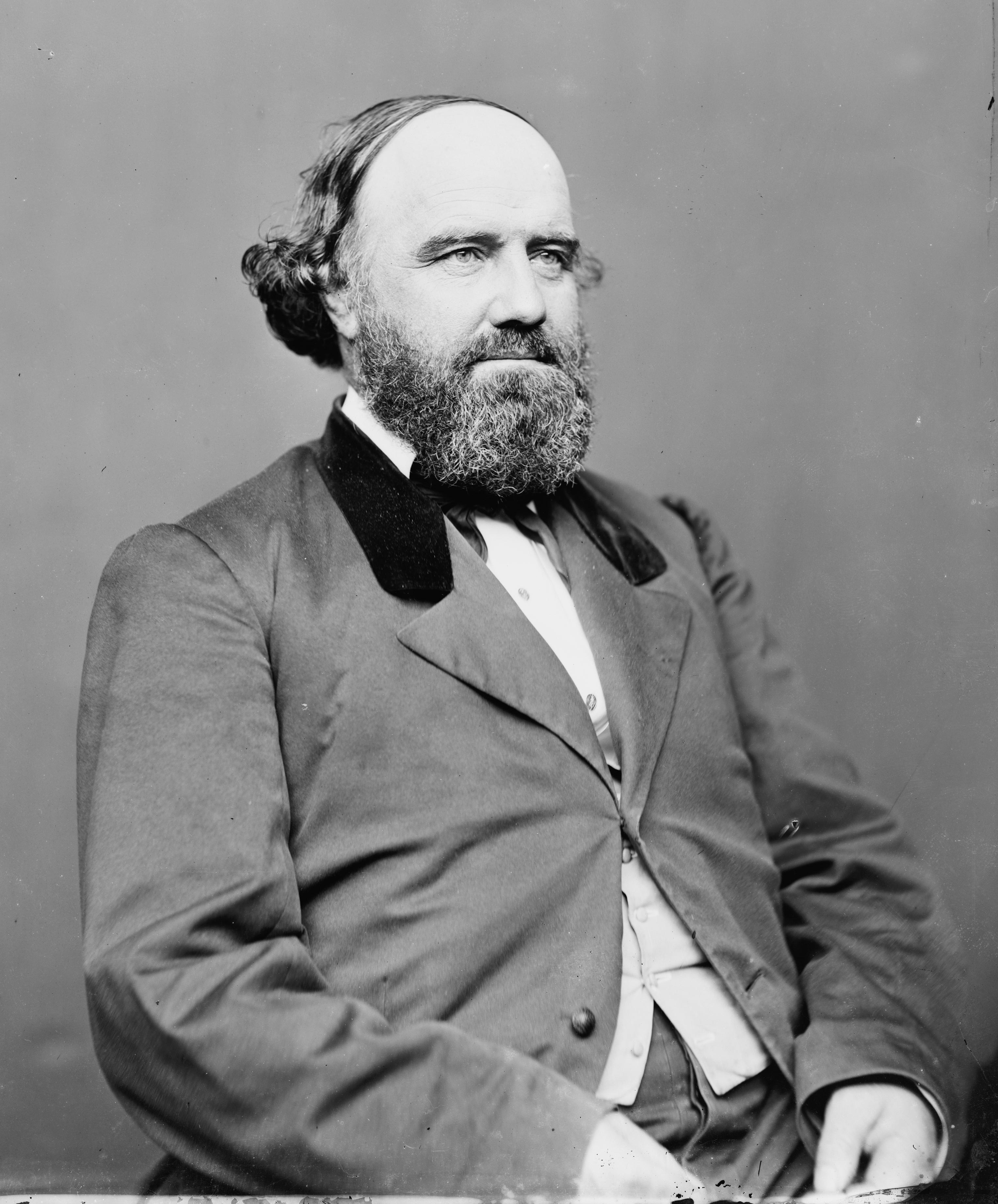

United States Senator from Kansas
- In office April 4, 1861 – March 3, 1873
- Preceded by: None (statehood)
- Succeeded by: John J. Ingalls

Member of the Massachusetts House of Representatives from Southampton
- In office 1852–1853
- Preceded by: Chauncy Clapp
- Succeeded by: Vacant

Personal details
- Born: Samuel Clarke Pomeroy; January 3, 1816 Southampton, Massachusetts, U.S.
- Died: August 27, 1891 (aged 75) Whitinsville, Massachusetts, U.S.
- Party: Republican
- Spouse: Lucy Gaylord (m. April 23, 1846–1863 her death) Martha Stanwood Mann Whiting (m. September 20, 1866–1891)
- Education: Amherst College
- Profession: Politician; Teacher; Railroad President

Samuel Clarke Pomeroy (January 3, 1816 – August 27, 1891) was a United States senator from Kansas in the mid-19th century. He served in the United States Senate during the American Civil War. Pomeroy also served in the Massachusetts House of Representatives. A Republican, he also was the mayor of Atchison, Kansas, from 1858 to 1859, the second president of the Atchison, Topeka and Santa Fe Railroad, and the first president to oversee any of the railroad's construction and operations. Pomeroy succeeded Cyrus K. Holliday as president of the railroad on January 13, 1864.

== Career ==
=== Early life ===
Samuel C. Pomeroy was born on January 3, 1816, at Southampton, Massachusetts. He attended Amherst College. Pomeroy opposed the politics of slavery, and in 1854 he became an affiliate of the New England Emigrant Aid Company. That fall, he led a group of settlers to Kansas to help found the city of Lawrence.

=== 1860s ===
On April 4, 1861, the Kansas legislature elected Pomeroy (along with James Lane) to be one of Kansas's first federal senators. In 1863, during the Civil War, Pomeroy escorted Frederick Douglass to the War Department building to meet War Secretary Edwin Stanton. Afterwards, Douglass attended a meeting with President Abraham Lincoln.

In 1862, Pomeroy was a supporter of Linconia, a plan to resettle freed African Americans from the United States.

In 1864, Pomeroy was the chair of a committee supporting Secretary of the Treasury Salmon P. Chase for the Republican nomination for President of the United States over the incumbent, Abraham Lincoln. Pomeroy also spoke in support of Chase's candidacy in the Senate. The Pomeroy committee issued a confidential circular to leading Republicans in February 1864 attacking Lincoln, which had the unintended effect of galvanizing support for Lincoln and seriously damaging Chase's prospects.

=== 1870s ===
On December 18, 1871, at the urging of Ferdinand Vandeveer Hayden and after learning of the findings of the Hayden Geological Survey of 1871, Pomeroy introduced the Act of Dedication bill into the Senate that ultimately led to the creation of Yellowstone National Park. On October 11, 1873, Martin F. Conway fired three shots at Pomeroy on New York Avenue in Washington, D.C. One shot hitting his chest and deflecting off his breastbone.

=== 1880s ===
During the 1880 presidential election Pomeroy was John W. Phelps' running mate on the revived Anti-Masonic Party.

== Bribery charges ==
During the Kansas senatorial election of 1873, it was alleged that Senator Pomeroy paid $7,000 (~$166,356 in 2024) to Mr. Alexander M. York, a Kansas state senator, to secure his vote for reelection to the Senate by the Kansas State Legislature. York publicly disclosed the alleged bribe was an attempt to pin a bribery charge against the senator. After 19 ballots in the Kansas Legislature, Pomeroy was ultimately defeated when insiders turned to John J. Ingalls.

Pomeroy took to the Senate floor on February 10, 1873, to deny the allegations as a "conspiracy ... for the purpose of accomplishing my defeat," and urged the creation of a special committee to investigate the allegations. The payment of the $7,000 (~$166,356 in 2024) was never disputed by witnesses, but instead of being a bribe it was described to the committee as a payment meant to be passed along to a second individual as seed money to start a national bank. The Special Committee on the Kansas Senatorial Election issued its report on March 3, 1873, which determined there was insufficient evidence to sustain the bribery charge, and instead was part of a "concerted plot" to defeat Senator Pomeroy.

Senator Allen G. Thurman of Ohio disagreed with the special committee's findings, stating his belief in Pomeroy's guilt and calling attempts to explain the payment as something other than a bribe as "so improbable, especially in view of the circumstances attending the senatorial election, that reliance cannot be placed upon them." However, Thurman chose not to pursue the matter further, as March 3 coincided with Senator Pomeroy's last day in office. This whole matter was alluded to in detail in the satire The Gilded Age: A Tale of Today by Mark Twain and Charles Dudley Warner, in which the prominent character Senator Dillworth is based on Pomeroy.

U.S. Senate
Preceded by (none)	U.S. senator (Class 3) from Kansas; April 4, 1861 – March 3, 1873; Served alongside: James H. Lane, Edmund G. Ross, Alexander Caldwell	Succeeded by John J. Ingalls
Business positions
Preceded by Cyrus K. Holliday	President of Atchison, Topeka and Santa Fe Railway; 1863–1868	Succeeded by William F. Nast
