= John Hampton Watson =

American judge (1804–1883)

John Hampton Watson (December 31, 1804 – August 16, 1883) was an American medical doctor, lawyer, and judge for various periods of his life in Pennsylvania, Ohio, and Kansas.

== Life, education and medical career ==
He was born December 31, 1804, in Bucks County, Pennsylvania into a Quaker family who had come to America with William Penn.

He began to study at the age of 21, and graduated in medicine in 1829 from the University of Pennsylvania, and started to practice in Quakertown, Pennsylvania. He married Hannah Lester in June 1829 with whom he stayed married to until her death in 1879. Together they had several children including Anna Margaret (Watson) Randolph (1838–1917) who was known in her own right for her passion on abolition, women's suffrage and prohibition.

He then moved with his family to Warren County, Ohio in the spring of 1835 to continue to practice medicine for a further five years. Then deciding on change of career and begum to study law, and was admitted to the bar in 1844.

Due to his prominent position as both a doctor and a lawyer he became known as a leader in the opposition of slavery in Ohio. It was again on the issue of slavery in Kansas due to be decided by "a majority of its citizens" that was the inspiration for John to move his family from Ohio to Kansas.

Over the winter of 1857 and into 1858 Watson built a five room house made of stone, and planted what was thought to be the first Wisteria in Kansas that he had brought with him from Ohio.

== Legal career ==
He practiced law in Kansas from 1558 until 1862 when the vacancy for the office of chief justice of the supreme court became available due to Thomas Ewing Jr. going into military service.

In September 1862 his name was on the Emporia ticket for a number of positions: governor; lieutenant governor; associate justice; attorney general; representative and senator.

He was elected to be the chief justice of the Kansas Supreme Court by a large majority on November 4, 1862, winning 9,176 votes to his opponent's 6,016. However, the election was ruled void due to a legal technicality and he never took up the position. It was a surprise to many that at the convening of the new session it was not Watson as the chief justice-elect but Nelson Cobb who presented to the court instead as appointed by Governor Charles L. Robinson, with some calling the matter fraudulent.

A few months later in April 1663 Watson filed a challenge for his right to take the Chief Justice position, but in October the court pronounced in favor of Judge Cobb meaning elections would be held later that year. Although he was encourage to stand again Watson declined a renomination.

Watson went on to play an active role in the Missouri, Kansas & Texas railway, later to become the Missouri Pacific.

Watson was also twice elected, from 1864 till 1872, as a judge in the 5th Judicial District encompassing Emporia, Kansas, where he resided. At the end of his two terms on the court Watson retired from professional service.

== Death ==
Watson died at his home in Emporia August 16, 1883 just after 9 PM, after a lingering illness and dysentery lasting two weeks. He was survived by all of his children, two sons and three daughters.

Political offices
Preceded by Thomas Ewing Jr.	Justice of the Kansas Supreme Court (election voided); 1862–1862	Succeeded by Nelson Cobb
