= List of United States representatives in the 43rd Congress =

This is a complete list of United States representatives during the 43rd United States Congress listed by seniority.

As an historical article, the districts and party affiliations listed reflect those during the 43rd Congress (March 4, 1873 – March 3, 1875). Seats and party affiliations on similar lists for other congresses will be different for certain members.

Seniority depends on the date on which members were sworn into office. Since many members are sworn in on the same day, subsequent ranking is based on previous congressional service of the individual and then by alphabetical order by the last name of the representative.

Committee chairmanship in the House is often associated with seniority. However, party leadership is typically not associated with seniority.

Note: The "*" indicates that the representative/delegate may have served one or more non-consecutive terms while in the House of Representatives of the United States Congress.

== U.S. House seniority list ==
U.S. House seniority
Rank	Representative	Party	District	Seniority date (previous service, if any)	No.# of term(s)	Notes
1	Henry L. Dawes	R	MA-11	March 4, 1857	9th term	Dean of the House; Left the House in 1875.
2	William D. Kelley	R	PA-04	March 4, 1861	7th term	
3	Samuel Hooper	R	MA-04	December 2, 1861	7th term	Died on February 14, 1875.
4	James G. Blaine	R	ME-03	March 4, 1863	6th term	Speaker of the House
5	Charles A. Eldredge	D	WI-05	March 4, 1863	6th term	Left the House in 1875.
6	James A. Garfield	R	OH-19	March 4, 1863	6th term	
7	Leonard Myers	R	PA-03	March 4, 1863	6th term	Left the House in 1875.
8	Samuel J. Randall	D	PA-01	March 4, 1863	6th term	
9	Glenni W. Scofield	R	PA	March 4, 1863	6th term	Left the House in 1875.
10	Samuel S. Marshall	D	IL-19	March 4, 1865; Previous service, 1855–1859.	7th term*	Left the House in 1875.
11	William E. Niblack	D	IN-01	March 4, 1865; Previous service, 1857–1861.	7th term*	Left the House in 1875.
12	Philetus Sawyer	R	WI-06	March 4, 1865	5th term	Left the House in 1875.
13	Horace Maynard	R	TN	July 24, 1866; Previous service, 1857–1863.	8th term*	Left the House in 1875.
14	George Madison Adams	D	KY-09	March 4, 1867	4th term	Left the House in 1875.
15	Stevenson Archer	D	MD-02	March 4, 1867	4th term	Left the House in 1875.
16	William Henry Barnum	D	CT-04	March 4, 1867	4th term	
17	James B. Beck	D	KY-07	March 4, 1867	4th term	Left the House in 1875.
18	James Brooks	D	NY-06	March 4, 1867; Previous service, 1849–1853 and 1863–1866.	8th term**	Died on April 30, 1873.
19	Benjamin Butler	R	MA-06	March 4, 1867	4th term	
20	Roderick R. Butler	R	TN-01	March 4, 1867	4th term	Left the House in 1875.
21	John Coburn	R	IN-05	March 4, 1867	4th term	Left the House in 1875.
22	William S. Holman	D	IN-03	March 4, 1867; Previous service, 1859–1865.	7th term*	
23	Luke P. Poland	R	VT-02	March 4, 1867	4th term	Left the House in 1875.
24	John P. C. Shanks	R	IN-09	March 4, 1867; Previous service, 1861–1863.	5th term*	Left the House in 1875.
25	Henry H. Starkweather	R	CT-03	March 4, 1867	4th term	
26	J. Hale Sypher	R	LA-01	March 4, 1867	4th term	Resigned on March 3, 1875.
27	William Williams	R	IN	March 4, 1867	4th term	Left the House in 1875.
28	Fernando Wood	R	NY-10	March 4, 1867; Previous service, 1841–1843 and 1863–1865.	6th term**	
29	James Buffington	R	MA-01	March 4, 1869; Previous service, 1855–1863.	7th term*	
30	Clinton L. Cobb	R	NC-01	March 4, 1869	3rd term	Left the House in 1875.
31	Omar D. Conger	R	MI-07	March 4, 1869	3rd term	
32	Chester Bidwell Darrall	R	LA-03	March 4, 1869	3rd term	
33	Eugene Hale	R	ME-05	March 4, 1869	3rd term	
34	John B. Hawley	R	IL-06	March 4, 1869	3rd term	Left the House in 1875.
35	Charles Hays	R	AL-04	March 4, 1869	3rd term	
36	George Frisbie Hoar	R	MA-09	March 4, 1869	3rd term	
37	Stephen Kellogg	R	CT-02	March 4, 1869	3rd term	Left the House in 1875.
38	George W. McCrary	R	IA-01	March 4, 1869	3rd term	
39	Frank Morey	R	LA-05	March 4, 1869	3rd term	
40	James S. Negley	R	PA-22	March 4, 1869	3rd term	Left the House in 1875.
41	Jasper Packard	R	IN	March 4, 1869	3rd term	Left the House in 1875.
42	John B. Packer	R	PA-14	March 4, 1869	3rd term	
43	Clarkson Nott Potter	D	NY-11	March 4, 1869	3rd term	Left the House in 1875.
44	Lionel Allen Sheldon	R	LA-02	March 4, 1869	3rd term	Left the House in 1875.
45	Thomas Swann	D	MD-04	March 4, 1869	3rd term	
46	Washington Townsend	R	PA-07	March 4, 1869	3rd term	
47	James Noble Tyner	R	IN-08	March 4, 1869	3rd term	Left the House in 1875.
48	Erastus Wells	D	MO-02	March 4, 1869	3rd term	
49	William A. Wheeler	R	NY-18	March 4, 1869; Previous service, 1861–1863.	4th term*	
50	Charles W. Willard	R	VT-01	March 4, 1869	3rd term	Left the House in 1875.
51	Leonard Myers	R	PA-03	April 9, 1869; Previous service, 1863–1869.	6th term*	Left the House in 1875.
52	Horatio C. Burchard	R	IL-05	December 6, 1869	3rd term	
53	Henry W. Barry	R	MS-03	April 8, 1870	3rd term	Left the House in 1875.
54	James H. Platt Jr.	R	VA-02	January 27, 1870	3rd term	Left the House in 1875.
55	George C. McKee	R	MS-05	February 23, 1870	3rd term	Left the House in 1875.
56	Henry W. Barry	R	MS-03	April 8, 1870	3rd term	Left the House in 1875.
57	Alexander S. Wallace	R	SC-04	May 27, 1870	3rd term	
58	Joseph Rainey	R	SC-01	December 12, 1870	3rd term	
59	Richard H. Whiteley	R	GA-02	December 22, 1870	3rd term	Left the House in 1875.
60	Pierce M. B. Young	D	GA-07	December 22, 1870; Previous service, 1868–1869.	4th term*	Left the House in 1875.
61	William E. Arthur	D	KY-06	March 4, 1871	2nd term	Left the House in 1875.
62	Thomas Samuel Ashe	D	NC-06	March 4, 1871	2nd term	
63	John T. Averill	R	MN-03	March 4, 1871	2nd term	Left the House in 1875.
64	J. Allen Barber	R	WI-03	March 4, 1871	2nd term	Left the House in 1875.
65	John M. Bright	D	TN-04	March 4, 1871	2nd term	
66	Freeman Clarke	R	NY-29	March 4, 1871; Previous service, 1863–1865.	3rd term*	Left the House in 1875.
67	Abram Comingo	D	MO-08	March 4, 1871	2nd term	Left the House in 1875.
68	Aylett R. Cotton	R	IA-02	March 4, 1871	2nd term	Left the House in 1875.
69	Edward Crossland	D	KY-01	March 4, 1871	2nd term	Left the House in 1875.
70	John James Davis	D	WV-01	March 4, 1871	2nd term	Left the House in 1875.
71	William G. Donnan	R	IA-03	March 4, 1871	2nd term	Left the House in 1875.
72	R. Holland Duell	R	NY-24	March 4, 1871; Previous service, 1859–1863.	4th term*	Left the House in 1875.
73	Mark H. Dunnell	R	MN-01	March 4, 1871	2nd term	
74	Benjamin T. Eames	R	RI-01	March 4, 1871	2nd term	
75	Robert B. Elliott	R	SC-03	March 4, 1871	2nd term	Resigned on November 1, 1874.
76	Charles B. Farwell	R	IL-03	March 4, 1871	2nd term	
77	Charles Foster	R	OH-10	March 4, 1871	2nd term	
78	William P. Frye	R	ME-02	March 4, 1871	2nd term	
79	John Hancock	D	TX-04	March 4, 1871	2nd term	
80	Alfred C. Harmer	R	PA-05	March 4, 1871	2nd term	Left the House in 1875.
81	John T. Harris	D	VA-07	March 4, 1871; Previous service, 1859–1861.	3rd term*	
82	Harrison E. Havens	R	MO-06	March 4, 1871	2nd term	Left the House in 1875.
83	Gerry Whiting Hazelton	R	WI-02	March 4, 1871	2nd term	Left the House in 1875.
84	John W. Hazelton	R	NJ-01	March 4, 1871	2nd term	Left the House in 1875.
85	Frank Hereford	D	WV-03	March 4, 1871	2nd term	
86	William S. Herndon	D	TX-01	March 4, 1871	2nd term	Left the House in 1875.
87	Sherman Otis Houghton	R	CA-04	March 4, 1871	2nd term	Left the House in 1875.
88	Charles St. John	D	NY-12	March 4, 1871	2nd term	Left the House in 1875.
89	Charles W. Kendall	D	NV	March 4, 1871	2nd term	Left the House in 1875.
90	John Weinland Killinger	R	PA-10	March 4, 1871; Previous service, 1859–1863.	4th term*	Left the House in 1875.
91	Charles N. Lamison	D	OH-05	March 4, 1871	2nd term	Left the House in 1875.
92	William H. Lamport	R	NY-26	March 4, 1871	2nd term	Left the House in 1875.
93	William E. Lansing	R	NY-23	March 4, 1871; Previous service, 1861–1863.	3rd term*	Left the House in 1875.
94	James M. Leach	D	NC-05	March 4, 1871; Previous service, 1859–1861.	3rd term*	Left the House in 1875.
95	David P. Lowe	R	KS	March 4, 1871	2nd term	Left the House in 1875.
96	Ebenezer McJunkin	R	PA-23	March 4, 1871	2nd term	Resigned on January 1, 1875.
97	Clinton L. Merriam	R	NY-21	March 4, 1871	2nd term	Left the House in 1875.
98	Alexander Mitchell	D	WI-04	March 4, 1871	2nd term	Left the House in 1875.
99	James Monroe	R	OH-18	March 4, 1871	2nd term	
100	Jackson Orr	R	IA-09	March 4, 1871	2nd term	Left the House in 1875.
101	Hosea W. Parker	D	NH-03	March 4, 1871	2nd term	Left the House in 1875.
102	Isaac C. Parker	D	MO-09	March 4, 1871	2nd term	Left the House in 1875.
103	James M. Pendleton	R	RI-02	March 4, 1871	2nd term	Left the House in 1875.
104	Eli Perry	D	NY-15	March 4, 1871	2nd term	Left the House in 1875.
105	William B. Read	D	KY-04	March 4, 1871	2nd term	Left the House in 1875.
106	Ellis H. Roberts	R	NY-22	March 4, 1871	2nd term	Left the House in 1875.
107	William R. Roberts	D	NY-05	March 4, 1871	2nd term	Left the House in 1875.
108	James Carroll Robinson	D	IL-12	March 4, 1871; Previous service, 1859–1865.	5th term*	Left the House in 1875.
109	Jeremiah M. Rusk	R	WI-07	March 4, 1871	2nd term	
110	Walter L. Sessions	R	NY-32	March 4, 1871	2nd term	Left the House in 1875.
111	Lazarus D. Shoemaker	R	PA-12	March 4, 1871	2nd term	Left the House in 1875.
112	Joseph Humphrey Sloss	D	AL-06	March 4, 1871	2nd term	Left the House in 1875.
113	Horace B. Smith	R	NY-27	March 4, 1871	2nd term	Left the House in 1875.
114	Oliver P. Snyder	R	AR-02	March 4, 1871	2nd term	Left the House in 1875.
115	R. Milton Speer	D	PA-17	March 4, 1871	2nd term	Left the House in 1875.
116	William P. Sprague	R	OH-15	March 4, 1871	2nd term	Left the House in 1875.
117	John B. Storm	D	PA-11	March 4, 1871	2nd term	Left the House in 1875.
118	William Henry Harrison Stowell	R	VA-04	March 4, 1871	2nd term	
119	Charles R. Thomas	R	NC-02	March 4, 1871	2nd term	Left the House in 1875.
120	Alfred Moore Waddell	D	NC-03	March 4, 1871	2nd term	
121	Henry Waldron	R	MI-02	March 4, 1871; Previous service, 1855–1861.	5th term*	
122	Washington C. Whitthorne	D	TN-06	March 4, 1871	2nd term	
123	Jeremiah M. Wilson	R	IN-04	March 4, 1871	2nd term	Left the House in 1875.
124	Wilder D. Foster	R	MI-05	December 4, 1871	2nd term	Died on September 20, 1873.
125	Alvah Crocker	R	MA-10	January 2, 1872	2nd term	Died on December 26, 1874.
126	D. C. Giddings	D	TX-03	May 13, 1872	2nd term	Left the House in 1875.
127	Joseph R. Hawley	R	CT-01	December 2, 1872	2nd term	Left the House in 1875.
128	William Albert	R	MD-05	March 4, 1873	1st term	Left the House in 1875.
129	Charles Albright	R	PA	March 4, 1873	1st term	Left the House in 1875.
130	John D. C. Atkins	D	TN-07	March 4, 1873; Previous service, 1857–1859.	2nd term*	
131	Henry B. Banning	LR	OH-02	March 4, 1873	1st term	
132	Granville Barrere	R	IL-09	March 4, 1873	1st term	Left the House in 1875.
133	Lyman K. Bass	R	NY-31	March 4, 1873	1st term	
134	Josiah Begole	R	MI-06	March 4, 1873	1st term	Left the House in 1875.
135	Hiram Parks Bell	D	GA-09	March 4, 1873	1st term	Left the House in 1875.
136	John Berry	D	OH-14	March 4, 1873	1st term	Left the House in 1875.
137	Richard P. Bland	D	MO-05	March 4, 1873	1st term	
138	James Henderson Blount	D	GA-06	March 4, 1873	1st term	
139	James S. Biery	R	PA-06	March 4, 1873	1st term	Left the House in 1875.
140	Rees Bowen	D	VA-09	March 4, 1873	1st term	Left the House in 1875.
141	Nathan B. Bradley	R	MI-08	March 4, 1873	1st term	
142	Frederick G. Bromberg	R	AL-01	March 4, 1873	1st term	Left the House in 1875.
143	John Y. Brown	D	KY-02	March 4, 1873; Previous service, 1860–1861.	2nd term*	
144	Aylett H. Buckner	D	MO-13	March 4, 1873	1st term	
145	Hezekiah S. Bundy	R	OH-11	March 4, 1873; Previous service, 1865–1867.	2nd term*	Left the House in 1875.
146	John H. Burleigh	R	ME-01	March 4, 1873	1st term	
147	Julius C. Burrows	R	MI-04	March 4, 1873	1st term	Left the House in 1875.
148	Richard H. Cain	R	SC	March 4, 1873	1st term	Left the House in 1875.
149	John Henry Caldwell	D	AL-05	March 4, 1873	1st term	
150	Thomas J. Cason	R	IN-07	March 4, 1873	1st term	
151	Joseph Gurney Cannon	R	IL-14	March 4, 1873	1st term	
152	John Cessna	R	PA-16	March 4, 1873; Previous service, 1869–1871.	2nd term*	Left the House in 1875.
153	Amos Clark Jr.	R	NJ-03	March 4, 1873	1st term	Left the House in 1875.
154	John Bullock Clark Jr.	D	MO-11	March 4, 1873	1st term	
155	Charles Clayton	R	CA-01	March 4, 1873	1st term	Left the House in 1875.
156	Isaac Clements	R	IL-18	March 4, 1873	1st term	Left the House in 1875.
157	Hiester Clymer	D	PA-08	March 4, 1873	1st term	
158	Stephen A. Cobb	R	KS	March 4, 1873	1st term	Left the House in 1875.
159	Philip Cook	D	GA-03	March 4, 1873	1st term	
160	Franklin Corwin	R	IL-07	March 4, 1873	1st term	Left the House in 1875.
161	Thomas J. Creamer	D	NY-07	March 4, 1873	1st term	Left the House in 1875.
162	Thomas Theodore Crittenden	D	MO-07	March 4, 1873	1st term	Left the House in 1875.
163	Philip S. Crooke	R	NY-04	March 4, 1873	1st term	Left the House in 1875.
164	Lorenzo Crounse	R	NE	March 4, 1873	1st term	
165	William Crutchfield	R	TN-03	March 4, 1873	1st term	Left the House in 1875.
166	Carlton B. Curtis	R	PA-19	March 4, 1873; Previous service, 1851–1855.	3rd term*	Left the House in 1875.
167	Lorenzo Danford	R	OH-16	March 4, 1873	1st term	
168	Alexander Davis	D	VA-05	March 4, 1873	1st term	Resigned on March 5, 1874.
169	David M. De Witt	D	NY-14	March 4, 1873	1st term	Left the House in 1875.
170	Samuel A. Dobbins	R	NJ-02	March 4, 1873	1st term	
171	Milton J. Durham	D	KY-08	March 4, 1873	1st term	
172	John R. Eden	D	IL-15	March 4, 1873; Previous service, 1863–1865.	2nd term*	
173	Moses W. Field	R	MI-01	March 4, 1873	1st term	Left the House in 1875.
174	Greenbury L. Fort	R	IL-08	March 4, 1873	1st term	
175	James C. Freeman	R	GA-05	March 4, 1873	1st term	Left the House in 1875.
176	John Montgomery Glover	D	MO-12	March 4, 1873	1st term	
177	Daniel W. Gooch	R	MA-05	March 4, 1873; Previous service, 1858–1865.	6th term*	Left the House in 1875.
178	Lewis B. Gunckel	R	OH-04	March 4, 1873	1st term	Left the House in 1875.
179	John Hagans	R	WV-02	March 4, 1873	1st term	Left the House in 1875.
180	Robert S. Hale	R	NY-17	March 4, 1873; Previous service, 1865–1867.	2nd term*	Left the House in 1875.
181	Robert Hamilton	D	NJ-04	March 4, 1873	1st term	
182	Benjamin W. Harris	R	MA-02	March 4, 1873	1st term	
183	Henry R. Harris	D	GA-04	March 4, 1873	1st term	
184	Horace Harrison	R	TN-05	March 4, 1873	1st term	Left the House in 1875.
185	Robert A. Hatcher	D	MO-04	March 4, 1873	1st term	
186	Henry H. Hathorn	R	NY-19	March 4, 1873	1st term	
187	George Whitman Hendee	R	VT-03	March 4, 1873	1st term	
188	Samuel F. Hersey	R	ME-04	March 4, 1873	1st term	Died on February 3, 1875.
189	Ebenezer R. Hoar	R	MA-07	March 4, 1873	1st term	Left the House in 1875.
190	Asa Hodges	R	AR-01	March 4, 1873	1st term	Left the House in 1875.
191	George Gilbert Hoskins	R	NY-30	March 4, 1873	1st term	
192	Albert R. Howe	R	MS-02	March 4, 1873	1st term	Left the House in 1875.
193	Jay Hubbell	R	MI-09	March 4, 1873	1st term	
194	Morton C. Hunter	R	IN-06	March 4, 1873; Previous service, 1867–1869.	2nd term*	
195	Eppa Hunton	D	VA-08	March 4, 1873	1st term	
196	Stephen A. Hurlbut	R	IL-04	March 4, 1873	1st term	
197	Ira B. Hyde	R	MO-10	March 4, 1873	1st term	Left the House in 1875.
198	William Joseph Hynes	D	AR	March 4, 1873	1st term	Left the House in 1875.
199	Hugh J. Jewett	D	OH-12	March 4, 1873	1st term	Resigned on June 23, 1874.
200	John A. Kasson	R	IA-07	March 4, 1873; Previous service, 1863–1867.	3rd term*	
201	Robert M. Knapp	D	IL-11	March 4, 1873	1st term	Left the House in 1875.
202	Lucius Quintus Cincinnatus Lamar	D	MS-01	March 4, 1873; Previous service, 1857–1860.	3rd term*	
203	William Lawrence	R	OH-08	March 4, 1873; Previous service, 1865–1871.	4th term*	
204	John D. Lawson	R	NY-08	March 4, 1873	1st term	Left the House in 1875.
205	Barbour Lewis	R	TN-09	March 4, 1873	1st term	Left the House in 1875.
206	James R. Lofland	R	DE	March 4, 1873	1st term	Left the House in 1875.
207	William Loughridge	R	IA-06	March 4, 1873; Previous service, 1867–1871.	3rd term*	Left the House in 1875.
208	Lloyd Lowndes Jr.	R	MD-06	March 4, 1873	1st term	Left the House in 1875.
209	John K. Luttrell	D	CA-03	March 4, 1873	1st term	
210	John R. Lynch	R	MS-06	March 4, 1873	1st term	
211	Clinton D. MacDougall	R	NY-25	March 4, 1873	1st term	
212	John A. Magee	D	PA-15	March 4, 1873	1st term	Left the House in 1875.
213	James S. Martin	R	IL-16	March 4, 1873	1st term	Left the House in 1875.
214	Alexander S. McDill	R	WI-08	March 4, 1873	1st term	Left the House in 1875.
215	James W. McDill	R	IA-08	March 4, 1873	1st term	
216	William P. McLean	D	TX-02	March 4, 1873	1st term	Left the House in 1875.
217	John McNulta	R	IL-13	March 4, 1873	1st term	Left the House in 1875.
218	David B. Mellish	R	NY-09	March 4, 1873	1st term	Died on May 23, 1874.
219	Charles W. Milliken	D	KY-03	March 4, 1873	1st term	
220	Roger Q. Mills	D	TX	March 4, 1873	1st term	
221	William S. Moore	R	PA-24	March 4, 1873	1st term	Left the House in 1875.
222	William Ralls Morrison	D	IL-17	March 4, 1873; Previous service, 1863–1865.	2nd term*	
223	Lawrence T. Neal	D	OH-07	March 4, 1873	1st term	
224	Jason Niles	R	MS-04	March 4, 1873	1st term	Left the House in 1875.
225	David A. Nunn	R	TN-08	March 4, 1873; Previous service, 1867–1869.	2nd term*	Left the House in 1875.
226	William J. O'Brien	D	MD-03	March 4, 1873	1st term	
227	Charles O'Neill	R	PA-02	March 4, 1873; Previous service, 1863–1871.	5th term*	
228	Godlove S. Orth	R	IN	March 4, 1873; Previous service, 1863–1871.	5th term*	Left the House in 1875.
229	Horace F. Page	R	CA-02	March 4, 1873	1st term	
230	Richard C. Parsons	R	OH-20	March 4, 1873	1st term	Left the House in 1875.
231	Charles Pelham	R	AL-03	March 4, 1873	1st term	Left the House in 1875.
232	William Walter Phelps	R	NJ-05	March 4, 1873	1st term	Left the House in 1875.
233	William A. Phillips	R	KS	March 4, 1873	1st term	
234	Austin F. Pike	R	NH-02	March 4, 1873	1st term	Left the House in 1875.
235	Thomas C. Platt	R	NY-28	March 4, 1873	1st term	
236	Henry Otis Pratt	R	IA-04	March 4, 1873	1st term	
237	William J. Purman	R	FL	March 4, 1873	1st term	Resigned on January 25, 1875.
238	Alonzo J. Ransier	R	SC-02	March 4, 1873	1st term	Left the House in 1875.
239	James T. Rapier	R	AL-02	March 4, 1873	1st term	Left the House in 1875.
240	Morgan Rawls	D	GA-01	March 4, 1873	1st term	Resigned on March 24, 1874.
241	William H. Ray	R	IL-10	March 4, 1873	1st term	Left the House in 1875.
242	John Blake Rice	R	IL-01	March 4, 1873	1st term	Died on December 17, 1874.
243	Hiram L. Richmond	R	PA-20	March 4, 1873	1st term	Left the House in 1875.
244	William M. Robbins	D	NC-07	March 4, 1873	1st term	
245	James Wallace Robinson	R	OH-09	March 4, 1873	1st term	Left the House in 1875.
246	Sobieski Ross	R	PA-18	March 4, 1873	1st term	
247	Henry B. Sayler	R	IN-10	March 4, 1873	1st term	Left the House in 1875.
248	Milton Sayler	D	OH-01	March 4, 1873	1st term	
249	John G. Schumaker	D	NY-02	March 4, 1873; Previous service, 1869–1871.	2nd term*	
250	Henry Joel Scudder	R	NY-01	March 4, 1873	1st term	Left the House in 1875.
251	Isaac W. Scudder	R	NJ-07	March 4, 1873	1st term	Left the House in 1875.
252	James Beverley Sener	R	VA-01	March 4, 1873	1st term	Left the House in 1875.
253	Charles Christopher Sheats	R	AL	March 4, 1873	1st term	Left the House in 1875.
254	Isaac R. Sherwood	R	OH-06	March 4, 1873	1st term	Left the House in 1875.
255	William B. Small	R	NH-01	March 4, 1873	1st term	Left the House in 1875.
256	James S. Smart	R	NY-16	March 4, 1873	1st term	Left the House in 1875.
257	A. Herr Smith	R	PA-09	March 4, 1873	1st term	
258	J. Ambler Smith	R	VA-03	March 4, 1873	1st term	Left the House in 1875.
259	John Quincy Smith	R	OH-03	March 4, 1873	1st term	Left the House in 1875.
260	William A. Smith	R	NC-04	March 4, 1873	1st term	Left the House in 1875.
261	Milton I. Southard	D	OH-13	March 4, 1873	1st term	
262	Edwin O. Stanard	R	MO-01	March 4, 1873	1st term	Left the House in 1875.
263	Elisha Standiford	D	KY-05	March 4, 1873	1st term	Left the House in 1875.
264	Horace B. Strait	R	MN-02	March 4, 1873	1st term	
265	James Dale Strawbridge	R	PA-13	March 4, 1873	1st term	Left the House in 1875.
266	William Henry Stone	D	MO-03	March 4, 1873	1st term	
267	Alexander W. Taylor	R	PA-21	March 4, 1873	1st term	Left the House in 1875.
268	Jacob Montgomery Thornburgh	R	TN-02	March 4, 1873	1st term	
269	Lyman Tremain	R	NY	March 4, 1873	1st term	Left the House in 1875.
270	Lemuel Todd	R	PA	March 4, 1873; Previous service, 1855–1857.	2nd term*	Left the House in 1875.
271	Robert B. Vance	D	NC-08	March 4, 1873	1st term	
272	Josiah T. Walls	R	FL	March 4, 1873; Previous service, 1871–1873.	2nd term*	
273	Jasper D. Ward	R	IL-02	March 4, 1873	1st term	Left the House in 1875.
274	Marcus Lawrence Ward	R	NJ-06	March 4, 1873	1st term	Left the House in 1875.
275	John O. Whitehouse	D	NY-13	March 4, 1873	1st term	
276	William Whiting	R	MA-03	March 4, 1873	1st term	Died on June 29, 1873.
277	David Wilber	R	NY-20	March 4, 1873	1st term	Left the House in 1875.
278	Charles G. Williams	R	WI-01	March 4, 1873	1st term	
279	John M. S. Williams	R	MA-08	March 4, 1873	1st term	Left the House in 1875.
280	George Willard	R	MI-03	March 4, 1873	1st term	
281	Asa H. Willie	D	TX	March 4, 1873	1st term	Left the House in 1875.
282	William W. Wilshire	R	AR-03	March 4, 1873	1st term	Resigned on June 16, 1874.
283	Ephraim K. Wilson II	D	MD-01	March 4, 1873	1st term	Left the House in 1875.
284	Joseph G. Wilson	R	OR	March 4, 1873	1st term	Died on July 2, 1873.
285	Alexander White	R	AL	March 4, 1873; Previous service, 1851–1853.	2nd term*	Left the House in 1875.
286	Thomas Whitehead	D	VA-06	March 4, 1873	1st term	Left the House in 1875.
287	James Wilson	R	IA-05	March 4, 1873	1st term	
288	Simeon K. Wolfe	D	IN-02	March 4, 1873	1st term	Left the House in 1875.
289	Stewart L. Woodford	R	NY-03	March 4, 1873	1st term	Resigned on July 1, 1874.
290	Laurin D. Woodworth	R	OH-17	March 4, 1873	1st term	
291	John Duncan Young	D	KY-10	March 4, 1873	1st term	Left the House in 1875.
	Samuel S. Cox	D	NY-06	November 4, 1873; Previous service, 1857–1865 and 1869–1873.	7th term**	
	George Luke Smith	R	LA-04	November 24, 1873	1st term	Left the House in 1875.
	James Nesmith	D	OR	December 1, 1873	1st term	Left the House in 1875.
	Henry L. Pierce	R	MA-03	December 1, 1873	1st term	
	Alexander H. Stephens	D	GA-08	December 1, 1873; Previous service, 1843–1859.	9th term*	
	William B. Williams	R	MI-05	December 1, 1873	1st term	
	Christopher Thomas	R	VA-05	March 5, 1874	1st term	Left the House in 1875.
	Andrew Sloan	R	GA-01	March 24, 1874	1st term	Left the House in 1875.
	Thomas M. Gunter	D	AR-03	June 16, 1874	1st term	
	Lewis C. Carpenter	R	SC-03	November 3, 1874	1st term	Left the House in 1875.
	Simeon B. Chittenden	R	NY-03	November 3, 1874	1st term	
	William E. Finck	D	OH-12	December 7, 1874; Previous service, 1863–1867.	3rd term*	Left the House in 1875.
	Richard Schell	D	NY-09	December 7, 1874	1st term	Left the House in 1875.
	John McCandless Thompson	R	PA-23	December 22, 1874	1st term	Left the House in 1875.
	Charles A. Stevens	R	MA-10	January 27, 1875	1st term	Left the House in 1875.
	Bernard G. Caulfield	D	IL-01	February 1, 1875	1st term	
	Effingham Lawrence	D	LA-01	March 3, 1875	1st term	Left the House in 1875.
	George A. Sheridan	R	LA	March 3, 1875	1st term	Left the House in 1875.

== Delegates ==
Rank	Delegate	Party	District	Seniority date (previous service, if any)	No.# of term(s)	Notes
1	Richard C. McCormick	R	AZ	March 4, 1869	3rd term	
2	Moses K. Armstrong	D	DAK	March 4, 1871	2nd term	
3	Jerome B. Chaffee	R	CO	March 4, 1871	2nd term	
4	Norton P. Chipman	R	DC	April 21, 1871	2nd term	
5	George Q. Cannon	R	UT	March 4, 1873	1st term	
6	Stephen B. Elkins	R	NM	March 4, 1873	1st term	
7	John Hailey	D	ID	March 4, 1873	1st term	
8	Martin Maginnis	D	MT	March 4, 1873	1st term	
9	Obadiah B. McFadden	D	WA	March 4, 1873	1st term	
10	William Randolph Steele	D	WY	March 4, 1873	1st term	

== See also ==
- 43rd United States Congress
- List of United States congressional districts
- List of United States senators in the 43rd Congress
