= Jacob Safford =

American judge (1827–1885)

Jacob Safford (August 17, 1827 – July 3, 1885) was a justice of the Kansas Supreme Court from January 9, 1865, to January 9, 1871.

== Early life, education, and career ==
Born in Royalton, Vermont, his father was Jacob J. Safford one of the founders of Oberlin College. He had his education at Oberlin, Ohio, where he also married and was admitted to the bar in 1854.

After obtaining the bar in 1854 he started practice in Norwalk, Ohio, before moving to Nebraska City and starting a law practice. He then relocated to Kansas in 1858 first to Lawrence, then Tecumseh, Kansas, then to Topeka, Kansas, where he lived for the rest of his life.

== Judicial service and later life ==
He was elected as the first district judge in Shawnee County serving from 1859 to 1863. Although he was elected in December 1859 under the Wyandotte Constitution the court did not open its chambers until April 25, 1861, with the first session of the court starting October 7, 1861. He was also the first district judge to hold court in Wabaunsee County, Kansas., the district judge of Riley County, Kansas, from 1861 to 1864. and the district judge of Jackson County, Kansas, in 1864.

After serving out the first term of the district court he was selected to run for the supreme court which he won succeeding Samuel Austin Kingman. Judge Safford took his seat upon the supreme bench, as a justice of the state of Kansas, in 1865, and served until 1870. He was a candidate for reelection in 1870, but lost renomination to David Josiah Brewer in September of that year, with his service on the court ending in January 1871. He held a high position at the bar of the state of Kansas, and was prominently connected with the railway enterprise in that state. He was the attorney for the Santa Fe Railroad. He came up with the idea of the Leavenworth, Topeka & Southwestern railway company and was its attorney, secretary and director for several years.

In October 1880 he also put himself forward as candidate to once again take the position of district judge.

He worked up until his death at which time he was the secretary and attorney for the Topeka, Salina and Western railway.

== Death and recognition ==
Saffordville, Kansas, was named after him sometime in the 1860s.

He died July 3, 1885, after a long illness, and had been fighting cancer of the stomach for more than a year. The appreciation in which he was held by his associates upon the bench of the Supreme Court may be best shown by the proceedings on the occasion of his death. The Shawnee county bar published a couple of resolutions honoring his character and his work as well as extending sympathy to his widow and children.

Political offices
| Preceded by Samuel Austin Kingman | Justice of the Kansas Supreme Court; 1865–1871 | Succeeded by David Josiah Brewer |
