= Alexander Caldwell =

American politician (1830–1917)

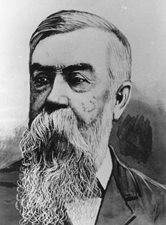

United States Senator from Kansas
- In office March 4, 1871 – March 24, 1873
- Preceded by: Edmund G. Ross
- Succeeded by: Robert Crozier

Personal details
- Born: March 1, 1830 Drakes Ferry, Pennsylvania, U.S.
- Died: May 19, 1917 (aged 87) Kansas City, Missouri, U.S.
- Party: Republican
- Spouse: Pace Heise

Alexander Caldwell (March 1, 1830 – May 19, 1917) was a U.S. Senator from Kansas.

== Early years ==
Born in Drakes Ferry, Pennsylvania, he attended public schools, and in 1847 enlisted as a private to serve in the Mexican–American War. He moved to Columbia, Pennsylvania, in 1848, where he was employed in a bank and subsequently went into business for himself.

He then moved to Leavenworth, Kansas, in 1861 and engaged in the transportation of military supplies to the various posts on the plains. He then worked building railroads, especially the Missouri River and Kansas Central Railroad.

== Politics ==
Caldwell was elected as a Republican to the U.S. Senate and had served just two years, from March 4, 1871, to March 24, 1873, when he resigned in the face of a movement to expel him for bribery and corruption. It was claimed that he had bribed his political opponents not to run, leaving the field clear for himself.

Senatorial candidate Thomas Carney (and former Governor of Kansas), admitted that he had accepted $15,000 from Caldwell to leave the race and thereby assist in Caldwell's election in 1871.

== Later years ==
From 1877 to 1897, he manufactured wagons and carriages, and from 1897 to 1915 he was president of the First National Bank of Leavenworth. In the 1880s, Caldwell was the president of the Idaho and Oregon Land Improvement Company, which purchased acreage next to the tracks of the Oregon Short Line Railroad. The city of Caldwell in southwestern Idaho is named after him.

Caldwell died in Kansas City, Missouri in 1917, and is interred at Mount Muncie Cemetery in Leavenworth, Kansas.

== See also ==
- List of federal political scandals in the United States

U.S. Senate
Preceded by Edmund G. Ross	U.S. Senator (Class 2) from Kansas; 1871–1873; Served alongside: Samuel C. Pomeroy, John Ingalls	Succeeded by Robert Crozier
