= William A. Peffer =

American politician

William Alfred Peffer
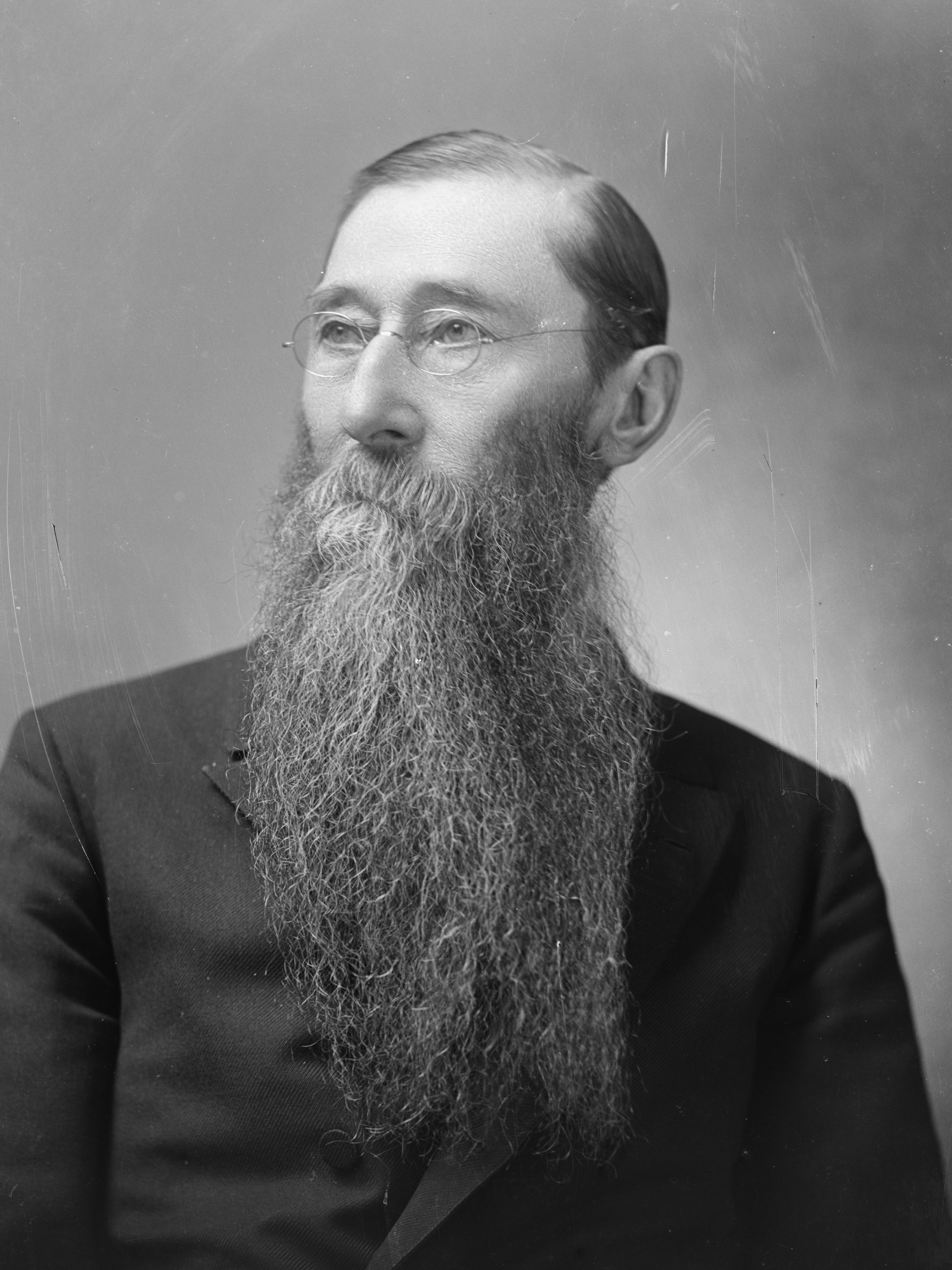
- Peffer c. 1905–1906

United States Senator from Kansas
- In office March 4, 1891 – March 3, 1897
- Preceded by: John J. Ingalls
- Succeeded by: William A. Harris

Member of the Kansas Senate
- In office 1874; 1876

Personal details
- Born: September 10, 1831 Cumberland County, Pennsylvania
- Died: October 6, 1912 (aged 81) Grenola, Kansas
- Party: Republican Party (United States); Farmers' Alliance; People's Party (Populist); Prohibition Party
- Military career
- Allegiance: United States
- Branch: Union Army
- Service years: 1862 - 1865
- Rank: second lieutenant: American Civil War

William Alfred Peffer (September 10, 1831 – October 6, 1912) was an American lawyer, Union Army officer during the American Civil War, state legislator, and United States Senator from Kansas. He was the first of six Populists (two of whom were from Kansas) elected to the United States Senate. In the Senate, he was recognizable by his enormous flowing beard. His name was also raised as a possible third-party presidential candidate in 1896.

== Early life ==
Born in Cumberland County, Pennsylvania, Peffer attended the public schools and commenced teaching at the age of 15. He followed the gold rush to San Francisco, California in 1850 and moved to Penn Township, St. Joseph County, Indiana in 1853, then Crawfordsville sometime afterwards before going to settle in Missouri in 1859, then Illinois in 1862.

== Civil War ==
During the Civil War he enlisted in the Union Army as a private, was promoted to second lieutenant, and served as regimental quartermaster and adjutant, post adjutant, judge advocate of the military commission, and department.

After the war, he studied law, and was admitted to the bar in 1865, commencing practice in Clarksville, Tennessee. He moved to Fredonia, Kansas in 1870 and continued the practice of law, and purchased and edited the Fredonia Journal.

== Political career ==
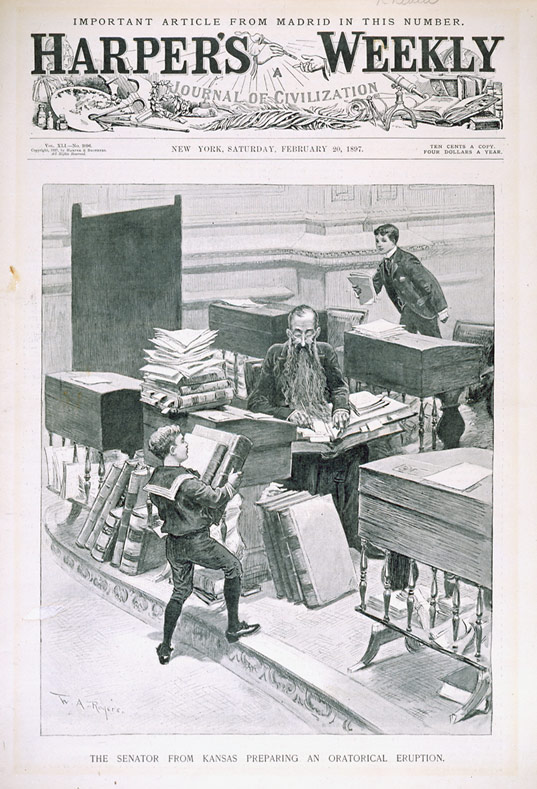
"The Senator from Kansas Preparing an Oratorical Eruption", Cartoon in Harper's Weekly, 1897

Peffer was a member of the Kansas Senate from 1874 to 1876 and moved to Coffeyville, Kansas, where he edited the Coffeyville Journal in 1875 and also practiced law. He was a presidential elector on Republican candidate James A. Garfield's ticket in 1880 and was editor of the Topeka-based Kansas Farmer in 1881.

He was elected as the People's Party candidate to the U.S. Senate by the Kansas Legislature and served from March 4, 1891, to March 3, 1897. (His campaign was materially strengthened by the work of Mary Elizabeth Lease.) While in the Senate, he was chairman of the Committee to Examine Branches of the Civil Service (Fifty-third and Fifty-fourth Congresses).

He was an unsuccessful candidate for reelection in 1896, being beaten by a fellow Populist William A. Harris, making Peffer the only Populist senator to be succeeded by a fellow Populist.

He was an unsuccessful candidate in the 1898 Kansas gubernatorial election, and afterward engaged in literary pursuits.

Peffer died in Grenola, Kansas in 1912. He was interred in Topeka Cemetery under a soldier's government-issued tombstone.

== Books ==
- Agricultural Depressions Causes and Remedies (1893) US Government Printing Office.
- Myriorama: a view of our people and their history, together with the principles underlying, and the circumstances attending the rise and progress of the American Union: a poem (1868)
- The Farmers' side - his troubles and their remedy (1890), and more.

== Footnotes ==
- United States Congress. "William A. Peffer (id: P000188)". Biographical Directory of the United States Congress. Retrieved on 2009-05-05

== Works ==
- Populism: Its Rise and Fall. [1899] Peter H. Argersinger (ed.). Lawrence, KS: University Press of Kansas, 1992.

U.S. Senate
Preceded by John J. Ingalls	U.S. senator (Class 3) from Kansas; 1891–1897; Served alongside: Preston B. Plumb, Bishop W. Perkins, John Martin, Lucien Baker	Succeeded by William A. Harris
