= Robert Crozier =

American judge (1827–1895)

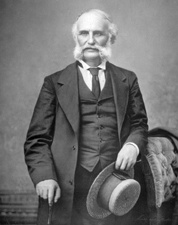

United States Senator from Kansas
- In office November 24, 1873 – February 12, 1874
- Appointed by: Thomas A. Osborn
- Preceded by: Alexander Caldwell
- Succeeded by: James M. Harvey

Chief Justice of the Kansas Supreme Court
- In office 1864–1867
- Preceded by: Nelson Cobb
- Succeeded by: Samuel Austin Kingman

United States Attorney for the District of Kansas
- In office 1861–1864
- Preceded by: John T. Burris
- Succeeded by: James S. Emory

Personal details
- Born: October 13, 1827 Cadiz, Ohio
- Died: October 2, 1895 (aged 67) Leavenworth, Kansas
- Resting place: Mount Muncie Cemetery, Lansing, Kansas
- Party: Whig (before 1854); Republican (from 1854)
- Spouse(s): Margaret Atkinson (m. 1852–1865, her death); Susan Eleanor Hunt (m. 1877–1895, his death)
- Relations: John Edgar Reyburn (son in law); William Stuart Reyburn (grandson)
- Children: 2 (including William Crozier)

Robert Crozier (October 13, 1827 – October 2, 1895) was an American attorney, judge and politician from Kansas. A Republican, he was most notable for his service as Chief Justice of the Kansas Supreme Court (1864–1867) and United States Senator from Kansas (1873–1874).

== Early life ==
Crozier was born in Cadiz, Ohio on October 13, 1827, the son of John Thomas Crozier (1790–1867) and Jane Ann (Ginn) Crozier (1801–1839). (Note: Crozier's name is sometimes spelled "Crosier.") He attended the public schools and Cadiz Academy, then began to study law with an attorney in Carrollton, Ohio. He was admitted to the bar in 1848, and began to practice in Carrollton.

== Start of career ==
While residing in Carrollton, Crozier also became editor of the Carroll Free Press newspaper. Originally active in politics as a Whig, from 1848 to 1850, Crozier served as prosecuting attorney of Carroll County. In the 1850s, Crozier served on Carroll County's board of examiners, which was responsible for reviewing the qualifications of teachers in the public schools and approving them for employment.

== Continued career ==
Crozier moved to Leavenworth, Kansas, on March 7, 1857, where he established the Leavenworth Daily Times newspaper and continued to practice law. He became a Republican when the party was founded in the mid-1850s, and he served on the Kansas territorial council from 1857 to 1858. In 1861, and Crozier was appointed United States attorney for the district of Kansas by President Abraham Lincoln. He served until 1864, when he resigned. From 1864 to 1867, Crozier served as Chief Justice of the Kansas Supreme Court. After leaving the bench, he resumed practicing law and also served as cashier and manager of the First National Bank of Leavenworth.

== Later career ==
On November 24, 1873, Crozier was appointed to the United States Senate to fill the vacancy caused by the resignation of Alexander Caldwell. He was not a candidate for election to the seat, and served until February 12, 1874, when a successor was elected. After leaving the Senate, Crozier resumed his banking and legal interests in Leavenworth.

Crozier served as judge of the first judicial district of Kansas from 1876 to 1892. He was a member of the board of directors of the Kansas Historical Society from 1886 to 1889.

== Death and burial ==
After retiring, Crozier continued reside in Leavenworth. He died in Leavenworth on October 2, 1895. Crozier was buried at Mount Muncie Cemetery in Lansing, Kansas.

== Family ==
In August 1852, Crozier married Margaret Atkinson (1824–1865) of Carrollton. In October 1877, Crozier married Susan Eleanor Hunt (1838–1902) of Princeton, New Jersey. With his first wife, Crozier was the father of son William (1855–1942) and daughter Margaretta (Maggie) (1863–1941). William Crozier was a career officer in the United States Army who attained the rank of brigadier general and served as the Army's Chief of Ordnance from 1901 to 1917. Margaretta Crozier was the wife of John Edgar Reyburn and mother of William Stuart Reyburn.

== Notes ==
U.S. Senate
Preceded by Alexander Caldwell	U.S. senator (Class 2) from Kansas; 1873–1874; Served alongside: John J. Ingalls	Succeeded by James M. Harvey
Political offices
Preceded by Nelson Cobb	Chief Justice of the Kansas Supreme Court; 1864–1867	Succeeded by Samuel Austin Kingman
