= Ambrose W. Thompson =

American shipbuilder and landowner

Amrbrose W. Thompson was a wealthy shipbuilder from Philadelphia. He acquired a large piece of land, the isthmus of Chiriqui, in the northern part of modern-day Panama. He thought it would make an ideal port because of its large lagoon and stocks of coal, so he offered to sell it to the United States Navy. However, in 1861, Chiriqui was brought to the attention of President Abraham Lincoln as a possible site to colonize with freed black slaves. Funds were appropriated by Congress, an emigration agent was appointed, and, by late 1862, 13,700 freed slaves had signed up for the plan. Financial irregularities (Thompson and his partners were paying off their personal debt with federal funds allocated to the project) stopped the plan. Also, complaints from neighboring countries about the plan kept it stalled. Lincoln next considered Île-à-Vache, off the west coast of Haiti, as a place for colonization.
