= Samuel Austin Kingman =

American politician and judge (1818–1904)

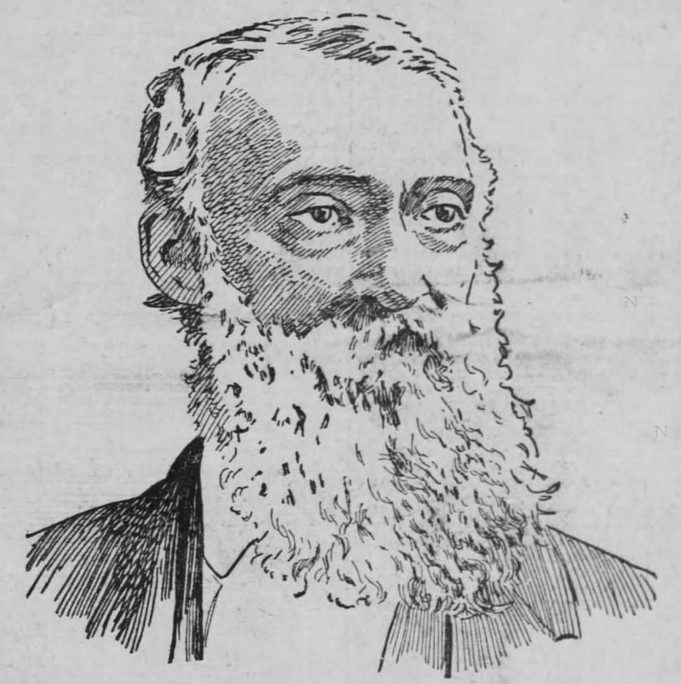
Samuel Austin Kingman

Samuel Austin Kingman (June 26, 1818 – September 9, 1904) was a justice of the Kansas Supreme Court from February 9, 1861 to January 9, 1865, and chief justice from January 14, 1867 to December 30, 1876.

== Early life, education, and career ==
Born June 26, 1818 in Worthington, Massachusetts, Kingman was educated at the common schools.

At the age of 20 he moved to Kentucky, where he resided for eighteen years, engaged first in teaching school, where he was admitted to the bar and practiced as an attorney; held the office of county clerk and county attorney.

In 1849, 1850 and 1851 he was a member of the Kentucky legislature serving as a member of the Kentucky House of Representatives as a Whig. He was one of twenty-five members of the 1850 legislature that did not draw their allotted recess payments. He had been member of the Whig Party and was the delegate from Lexington, Kentucky at the 1851 Whig State Convention. In 1856 he moved to Iowa, where he remained for only one year.

== Career in Kansas ==
In 1857 he emigrated to Kansas and settled on a farm in Browne County. His agricultural experiences not being satisfactory, he removed to Hiawatha, the county seat, opened a law office, and continued in the practice of his profession until 1865.

Kingman was a member of the Wyandotte convention of 1859, which framed the Kansas state constitution. He was elected June 7, 1859 to fill the delegate position for Brown County, Kansas gaining 93 of the 114 total votes. The convention started a few weeks later on July 5 and Kingman was elected as the temporary president.

The same year on October 2 he was nominated by the Republican state convention in Lawrence for the position of justice of the first Kansas supreme court. Shortly after on November 8 he resoundingly lost to Benjamin F. Killey to be the state probate judge. He was then duly elected a justice of the Supreme Court of Kansas along with Lawrence Dudley Bailey and with Thomas Ewing Jr. as the chief justice. He took up his seat upon the admission of the state into the Union in 1861, and held the position of justice for four years. In 1864 he ran for re-election as justice but was defeated, by Jacob Safford a local district judge at the time.

Two years later he was elected Chief Justice and took his seat January 14, 1867, for the term of six years. In 1872 he was re-elected for a full term, but at the end of 1876 he resigned his office by reason of his failing health and retired from active public life, residing at Topeka.

He was the president of both the Kansas State Historical society and the Kansas State Bar association.

In 1873 several people and organizations put Judge Kingman's name forward for senatorship, and although he was persuaded to run he lost to James M. Harvey.

Both Kingman County, Kansas and Kingman city were named in his honor during his lifetime, in 1872 and 1874 respectively.

== Death ==
In 1844, Kingman married Matilda Willets of Terre Haute, with whom he had two daughters Lucy and Lillian, all three of whom survived him.

He died suddenly September 9, 1904 aged 86 sitting in a chair at his home in Topeka. Although his health had been in decline for several years he was suffering no particular illnesses at the time so his death was deemed to be from old age. He had survived two of the chief justices that followed him, Albert H. Horton and David Martin as well as almost all of the other fifty-one delegates to the Wyandotte convention. He was buried at Topeka Cemetery.

Political offices
Preceded by Newly established court	Justice of the Kansas Supreme Court; 1861–1865	Succeeded by Jacob Safford
Preceded by Robert Crozier	Chief Justice of the Kansas Supreme Court; 1867–1876	Succeeded by Albert H. Horton
