= John J. Ingalls =

American politician (1833–1900)

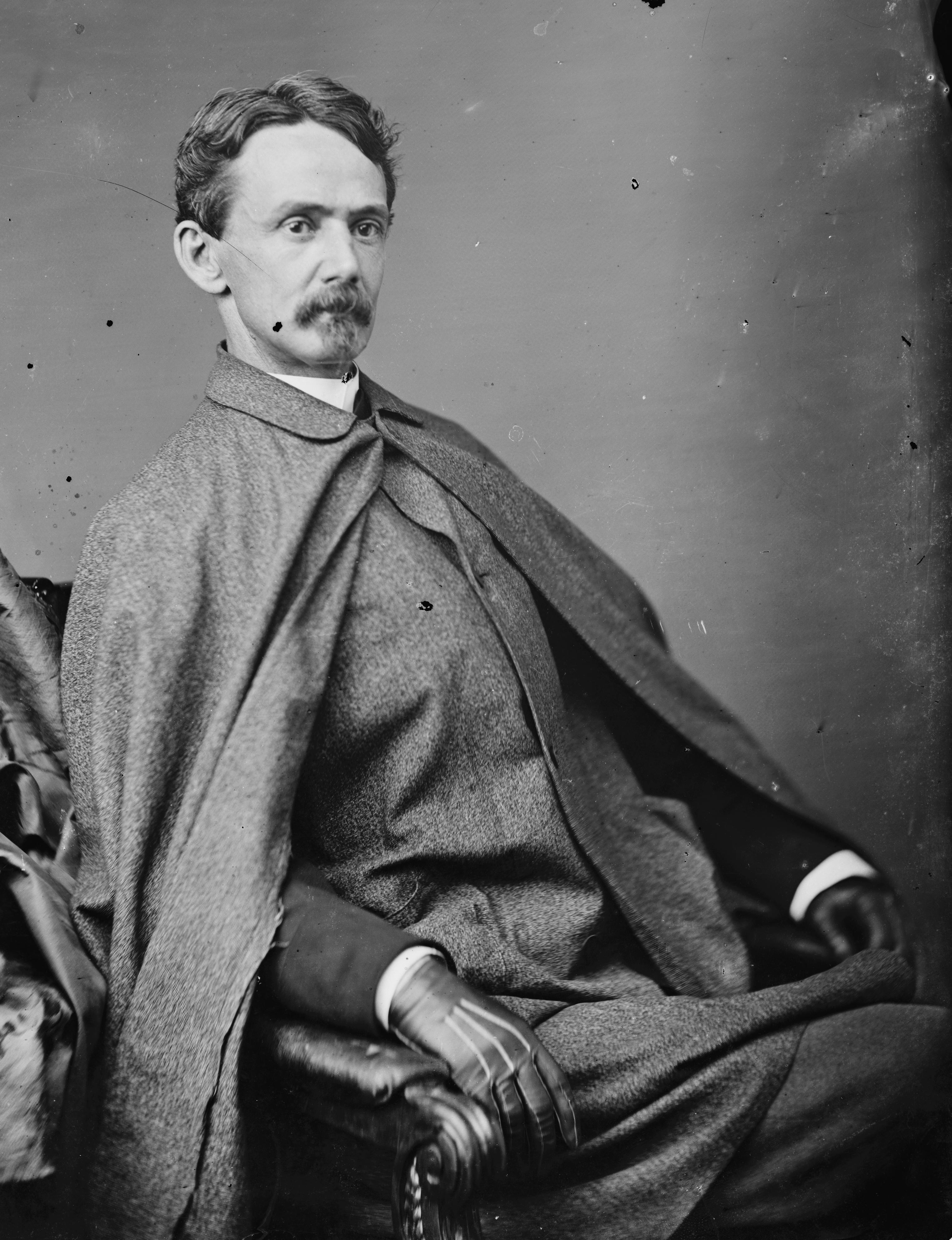
- Ingalls in 1873

President pro tempore of the United States Senate
- In office February 26, 1887 – March 3, 1891
- Preceded by: John Sherman
- Succeeded by: Charles F. Manderson

United States Senator from Kansas
- In office March 4, 1873 – March 3, 1891
- Preceded by: Samuel C. Pomeroy
- Succeeded by: William A. Peffer

Member of the Kansas Senate
- In office 1862

Personal details
- Born: December 29, 1833 Middleton, Massachusetts, U.S.
- Died: August 16, 1900 (aged 66) Las Vegas, New Mexico, U.S.
- Party: Republican

John James Ingalls (December 29, 1833 – August 16, 1900) was an American Republican politician who served as a United States senator from Kansas. Ingalls is credited with suggesting the state motto and designing the state seal.

== Early life ==
John James Ingalls was born in Middleton, Massachusetts, on December 29, 1833, to Elias T. Ingalls and Eliza C. Ingalls. Through his father's line, Ingalls was related to Edmund Ingalls, one of the founders of Lynn, Massachusetts. A first cousin of Elias was Mehitabel Ingalls, the grandmother of President James A. Garfield. He graduated from Williams College in 1855. Foreshadowing his later reputation as a wit, his commencement oration, entitled "Mummy Life," was a satire of college life. He studied law and was admitted to the bar in 1857. Moving to Kansas Territory, Ingalls settled in Atchison in 1860. He joined the anti-slavery forces and worked to make Kansas a free state. He was a member of the Wyandotte constitutional convention in 1859 and is reputed to have coined the state motto, Ad Astra per Aspera.

== Career ==
When Kansas was admitted to the Union in 1861, he became secretary of the first state Senate and state senator in 1862. During the Civil War, he served as judge advocate in the Kansas militia. As an editor of the Atchison newspaper, Freedom's Champion, for three years, he won a national reputation for a series of magazine articles. Elected to the U.S. Senate in 1873, succeeding Samuel C. Pomeroy, Ingalls served for 18 years. He supported labor and agriculture against monopolies. He also favored the Interstate Commerce Act and the Pendleton Civil Service Act. Ingalls rejected the nomination of James Campbell Matthews to the recorder of deeds in 1886. Ingalls claimed that his rejection was because of Matthews' non-residency of Washington, D.C.; however, journalists argued that his rejection was racially based.

In 1887 Ingalls was elected president pro tempore of the Senate.

== Death ==
Ingalls died from bronchitis at the Montezuma hotel in Las Vegas, New Mexico, on August 16, 1900, with his wife and son by his side. He was buried at Mount Vernon Cemetery in Atchison.

== Legacy ==
In 1905, the state of Kansas donated a marble statue of Ingalls to the U.S. Capitol's National Statuary Hall Collection. After an effort starting in 2011, Kansas replaced Ingalls with Amelia Earhart in 2022.

== Personal life ==
John James Ingalls married Anna Louise Chesebrough in 1865, they had eleven children including Sheffield Ingalls. At the time of Ingalls' death, six of his children were still living.

John James Ingalls was a second cousin of Charles Ingalls (father to Little House on the Prairie's Laura Ingalls Wilder).

== Notes ==
U.S. Senate
Preceded by Samuel C. Pomeroy	U.S. senator (Class 3) from Kansas; 1873–1891; Served alongside: Alexander Caldwell, Robert Crozier, James M. Harvey, Preston B. Plumb	Succeeded by William A. Peffer
Political offices
Preceded by John Sherman	President pro tempore of the United States Senate; February 26, 1887 – March 2, 1891	Succeeded by Charles F. Manderson
