= Siege of Petersburg =

1864–1865 battle of the American Civil War

- Part of the American Civil War
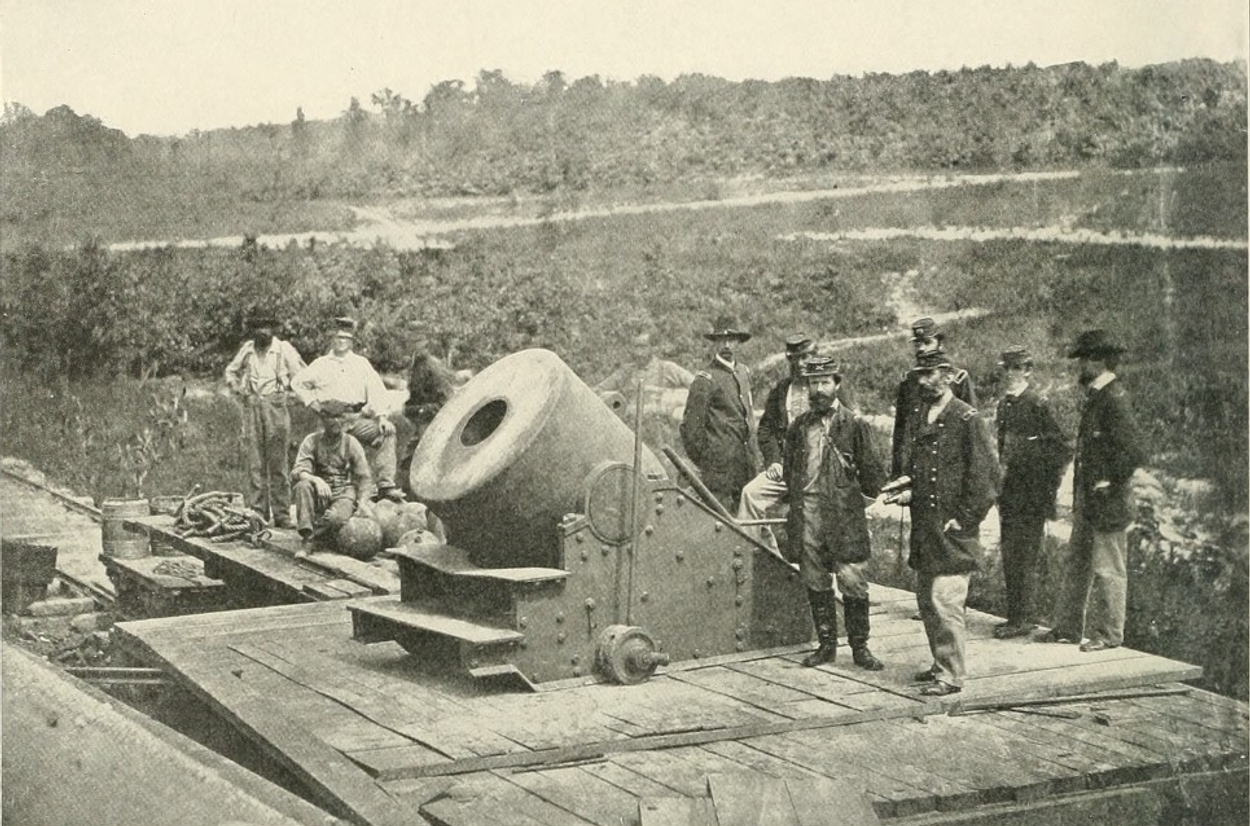
- The "Dictator" siege mortar at Petersburg. In the foreground, the figure on the right is Brig. Gen. Henry J. Hunt, chief of artillery of the Army of the Potomac.
Date	June 9, 1864 – March 25, 1865 (9 months, 2 weeks and 2 days)
Location	Petersburg, Virginia 37°13′06″N 77°22′40″W
Result	Union victory

Belligerents
United States	Confederate States

Commanders and leaders
Ulysses S. Grant; George Meade; Benjamin Butler	Robert E. Lee; P. G. T. Beauregard

Units involved
Army of the Potomac; Army of the James	Army of Northern Virginia; Department of North Carolina and Southern Virginia

Strength
125,000	60,000 (estimate)

Casualties and losses
42,000 (estimate)	28,000 (estimate); 25,000
- Location within Virginia

The Richmond–Petersburg campaign was a series of battles around Petersburg, Virginia, fought from June 9, 1864, to March 25, 1865, during the American Civil War. Although it is more popularly known as the siege of Petersburg, it was not a classic military siege, in which a city is encircled with fortifications blocking all routes of ingress and egress, nor was it strictly limited to actions against Petersburg.

The campaign consisted of nine months of trench warfare in which Union forces commanded by Lieutenant General Ulysses S. Grant assaulted Petersburg unsuccessfully and then constructed trench lines that eventually extended over 30 miles (48 km) from the eastern outskirts of Richmond, Virginia, to around the eastern and southern outskirts of Petersburg. Petersburg was crucial to the supply of Confederate General Robert E. Lee's army and the Confederate capital of Richmond. Numerous raids were conducted and battles fought in attempts to cut off the Richmond and Petersburg Railroad. Many of these battles caused the lengthening of the trench lines.

Lee finally gave in to the pressure and abandoned both cities in April 1865, leading to his retreat and surrender at Appomattox Court House. The siege of Petersburg foreshadowed the trench warfare that would be seen fifty years later in World War I, earning it a prominent position in military history. It also featured the war's largest concentration of African-American troops, who suffered heavy casualties at such engagements as the Battle of the Crater and Chaffin's Farm.

== Background ==
=== Military situation ===
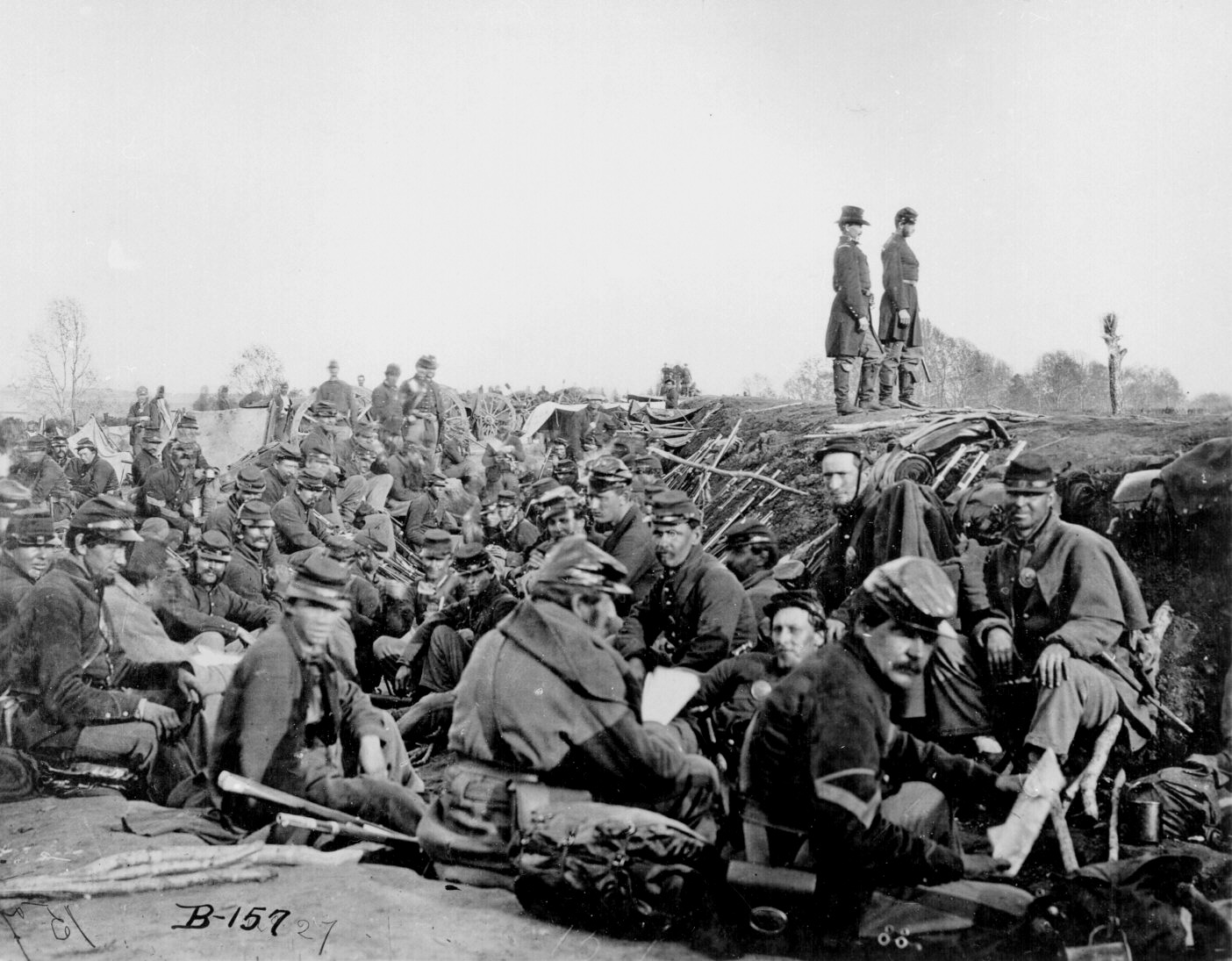
Fredericksburg, Virginia; May 1863. Soldiers in the trenches.

In March 1864, Ulysses S. Grant was promoted to lieutenant general and was given command of the Union Army. He devised a coordinated strategy to apply pressure on the Confederacy from many points, something President Abraham Lincoln had urged his generals to do from the beginning of the war. Grant put Major General William T. Sherman in immediate command of all forces in the West and moved his own headquarters to be with the Army of the Potomac (still commanded by Major General George G. Meade) in Virginia, where he intended to maneuver Lee's army to a decisive battle; his secondary objective was to capture Richmond (the capital of the Confederacy), but Grant knew that the latter would happen automatically once the former was accomplished. His coordinated strategy called for Grant and Meade to attack Lee from the north, while Major General Benjamin Butler drove toward Richmond from the southeast; Major General Franz Sigel to control the Shenandoah Valley; Sherman to invade Georgia, defeat General Joseph E. Johnston, and capture Atlanta; Brig. Gens. George Crook and William W. Averell to operate against railroad supply lines in West Virginia; and Major General Nathaniel P. Banks to capture Mobile, Alabama.

Most of these initiatives failed, often because of the assignment of generals to Grant for political rather than military reasons. Butler's Army of the James was bogged down against inferior Confederate forces led by General P.G.T. Beauregard before reaching Richmond in the Bermuda Hundred Campaign. Sigel was soundly defeated at the Battle of New Market in May and soon afterward he was replaced by Major General David Hunter. Banks was distracted by the Red River Campaign and failed to move on to Mobile. However, Crook and Averell were able to cut the last railway linking Virginia and Tennessee, and Sherman's Atlanta campaign was a success, although it dragged on through the fall.

On May 4, Grant and Meade's Army of the Potomac crossed the Rapidan River and entered the area known as the Wilderness of Spotsylvania, beginning the six-week Overland Campaign. At the bloody but tactically inconclusive Battle of the Wilderness (May 5–7) and Battle of Spotsylvania Court House (May 8–21), Grant failed to destroy Lee's army but, unlike his predecessors, did not retreat after the battles; he repeatedly moved his army leftward to the southeast in a campaign that kept Lee on the defensive and moved ever closer to Richmond. Grant spent the remainder of May maneuvering and fighting minor battles with the Confederate army as he attempted to turn Lee's flank and lure him into the open. Grant knew that his larger army and base of manpower in the North could sustain a war of attrition better than Lee and the Confederacy could. This theory was tested at the Battle of Cold Harbor (May 31 – June 12) when Grant's army once again came into contact with Lee's near Mechanicsville. He chose to engage Lee's army directly, by ordering a frontal assault on the Confederate fortified positions on June 3. This attack was repulsed with heavy losses. Grant did not regret the Battle of Cold Harbor, as is often portrayed; only the final assault: "I have always regretted that the last assault at Cold Harbor was ever made," he wrote in his personal memoirs. Still, though it pinned down Lee and forced the final chapter of the Civil War, the battle was so one-sided that Northern newspapers thereafter frequently referred to Grant as "the Butcher". Although Grant suffered high losses during the campaign—approximately 50,000 casualties, or 41%—Lee lost even higher percentages of his men—approximately 32,000, or 46%—losses that could not be replaced.

On the night of June 12, Grant again advanced by his left flank, marching to the James River. He planned to cross to the south bank of the river, bypassing Richmond, and isolate Richmond by seizing the railroad junction of Petersburg to the south. While Lee remained unaware of Grant's intentions, the Union army constructed a pontoon bridge 2,100 feet (640 m) long and crossed the James River on June 14–18. What Lee had feared most of all—that Grant would force him into a siege of Richmond—was poised to occur. Petersburg, a prosperous city of 18,000, was a supply center for Richmond, given its strategic location just south of Richmond, its site on the Appomattox River that provided navigable access to the James River, and its role as a major crossroads and junction for five railroads. Since Petersburg was the main supply base and rail depot for the entire region, including Richmond, the taking of Petersburg by Union forces would make it impossible for Lee to continue defending Richmond (the Confederate capital). This represented a change of strategy from that of the preceding Overland Campaign, in which confronting and defeating Lee's army in the open was the primary goal. Now, Grant selected a geographic and political target and knew that his superior resources could besiege Lee there, pin him down, and either starve him into submission or lure him out for a decisive battle. Lee at first believed that Grant's main target was Richmond and devoted only minimal troops under Beauregard to the defense of Petersburg.

== Opposing forces ==
=== Union ===
Key Union commanders
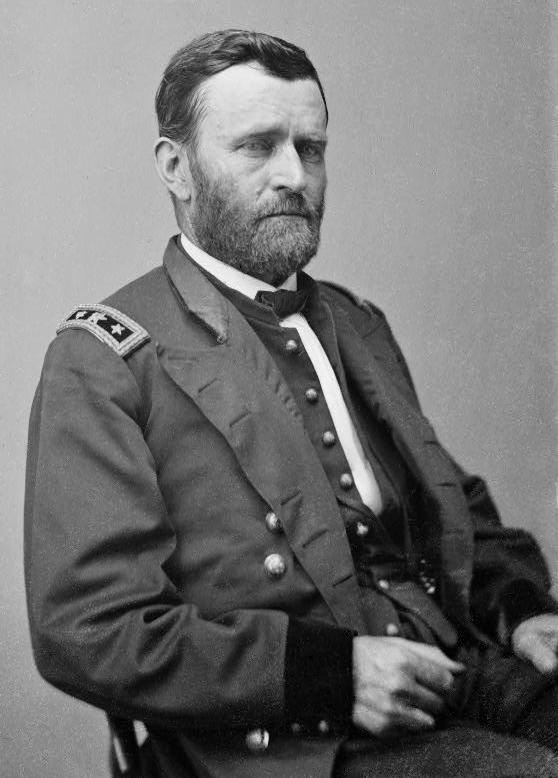
Lt. Gen.
Ulysses S. Grant

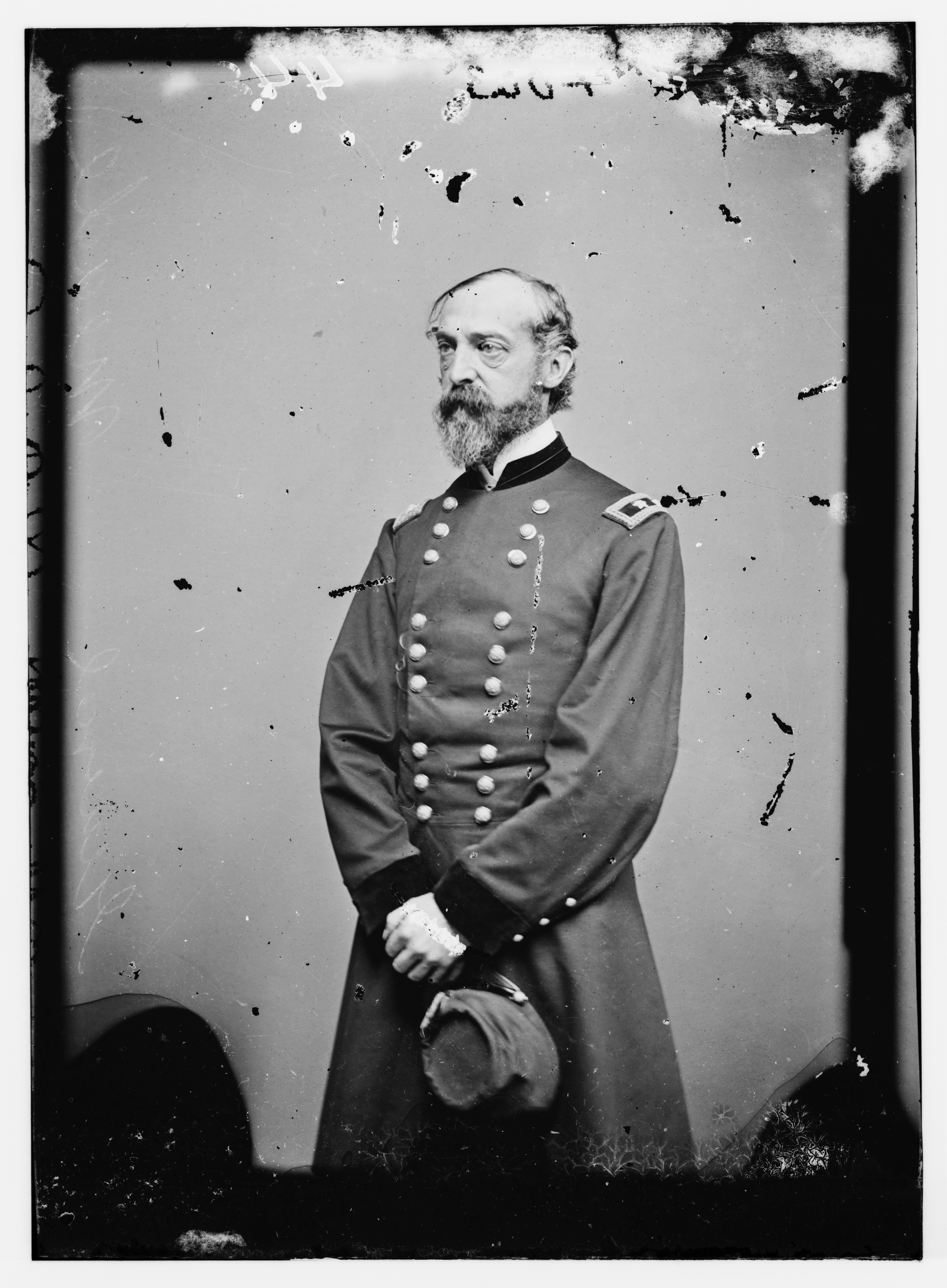
Maj. Gen.
George G. Meade

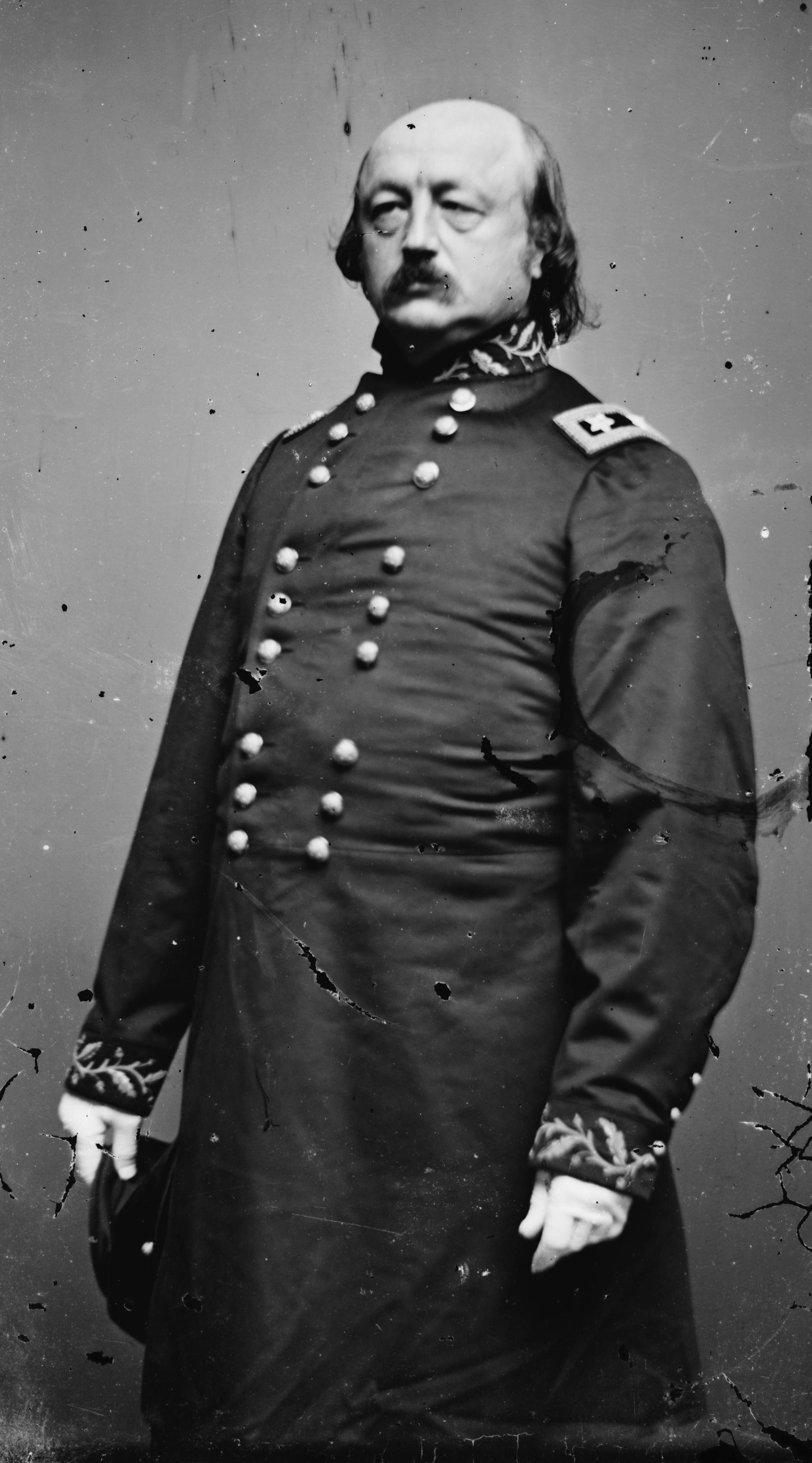
Maj. Gen.
Benjamin Butler

At the beginning of the campaign, Grant's Union forces consisted of the Army of the Potomac, under Meade, and the Army of the James, under Butler.

The Army of the Potomac included:

- II Corps, under Maj. Gen. Winfield S. Hancock, including the divisions of Maj. Gens. David B. Birney and John Gibbon and Brig. Gen. Francis C. Barlow.
- V Corps, under Maj. Gen. Gouverneur K. Warren, including the divisions of Brig. Gens. Charles Griffin, Romeyn B. Ayres, Samuel W. Crawford, and Lysander Cutler.
- VI Corps, under Maj. Gen. Horatio G. Wright, including the divisions of Brig. Gens. David A. Russell, Thomas H. Neill, and Truman Seymour. (The VI Corps was on detached service in the Shenandoah Valley from mid-July to early December 1864.)
- IX Corps, under Maj. Gen. Ambrose Burnside, including the divisions of Brig. Gens. James H. Ledlie, Robert B. Potter, Orlando B. Willcox, and Edward Ferrero (the latter division being manned by United States Colored Troops [USCTs]). Maj. Gen. John G. Parke replaced Burnside after the Battle of the Crater.
- Cavalry Corps, under Maj. Gen. Philip H. Sheridan, including the divisions of Brig. Gens. Alfred T.A. Torbert, David McM. Gregg, and James H. Wilson. Sheridan and much of his command were on detached service in the Shenandoah Valley from mid-July 1864 to late March 1865. Upon their return, Sheridan often referred to his Cavalry Corps as the Army of the Shenandoah, reflecting their role in the Valley Campaigns of 1864.

The Army of the James included:

- X Corps, under Maj. Gen. Quincy A. Gillmore (initially - June 15, 1864), Maj. Gen David B. Birney (from July 23, 1864 – October 10, 1864) and Brig. Gen. Alfred H. Terry, including the divisions of Brig. Gens. Robert S. Foster and Adelbert Ames.
- XVIII Corps, under Maj. Gen. William F. "Baldy" Smith, including the divisions of Brig. Gens. William T. H. Brooks, John H. Martindale, and Edward W. Hinks (the latter also a USCT division).
- XXIV Corps, under Maj. Gen. Edward O.C. Ord, including the divisions of Brig. Gen. Robert S. Foster, Maj. Gen. Thomas M. Harris, and Brig. Gen. Charles Devens.
- XXV Corps, under Maj. Gen. Godfrey Weitzel, including the divisions of Brig. Gens. Charles J. Paine, William Birney, and Edward A. Wild.
- Cavalry Division, under Brig. Gen. August Kautz.

On December 3, 1864, the racially integrated X Corps and XVIII Corps were reorganized to become the all-white XXIV Corps and the all-black (officers excepted) XXV Corps.

Grant made his headquarters in a cabin on the lawn of Appomattox Manor, the home of Richard Eppes and the oldest home (built in 1763) in what was then City Point, but is now Hopewell, Virginia.

=== Confederate ===
Key Confederate commanders
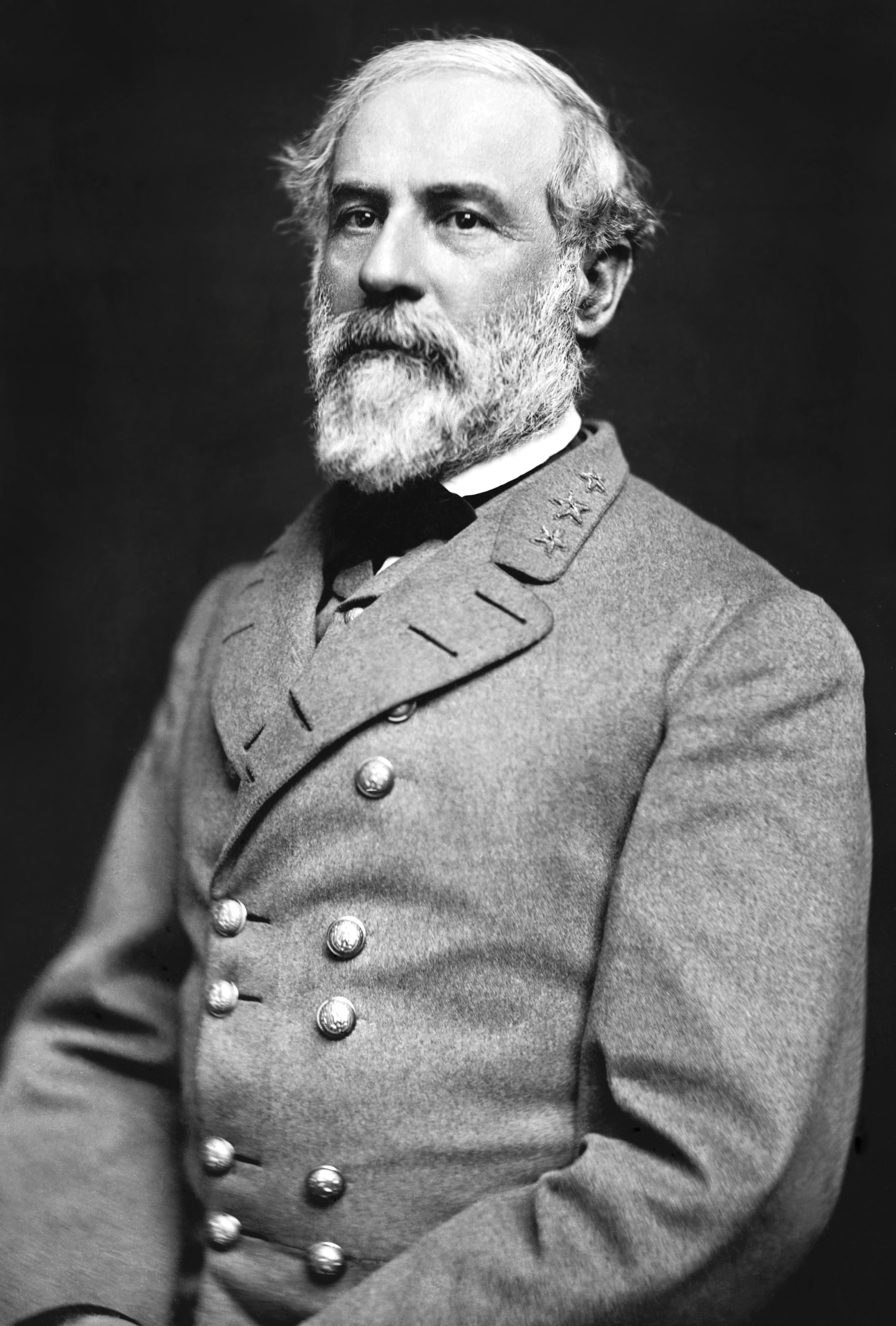
Gen.
Robert E. Lee

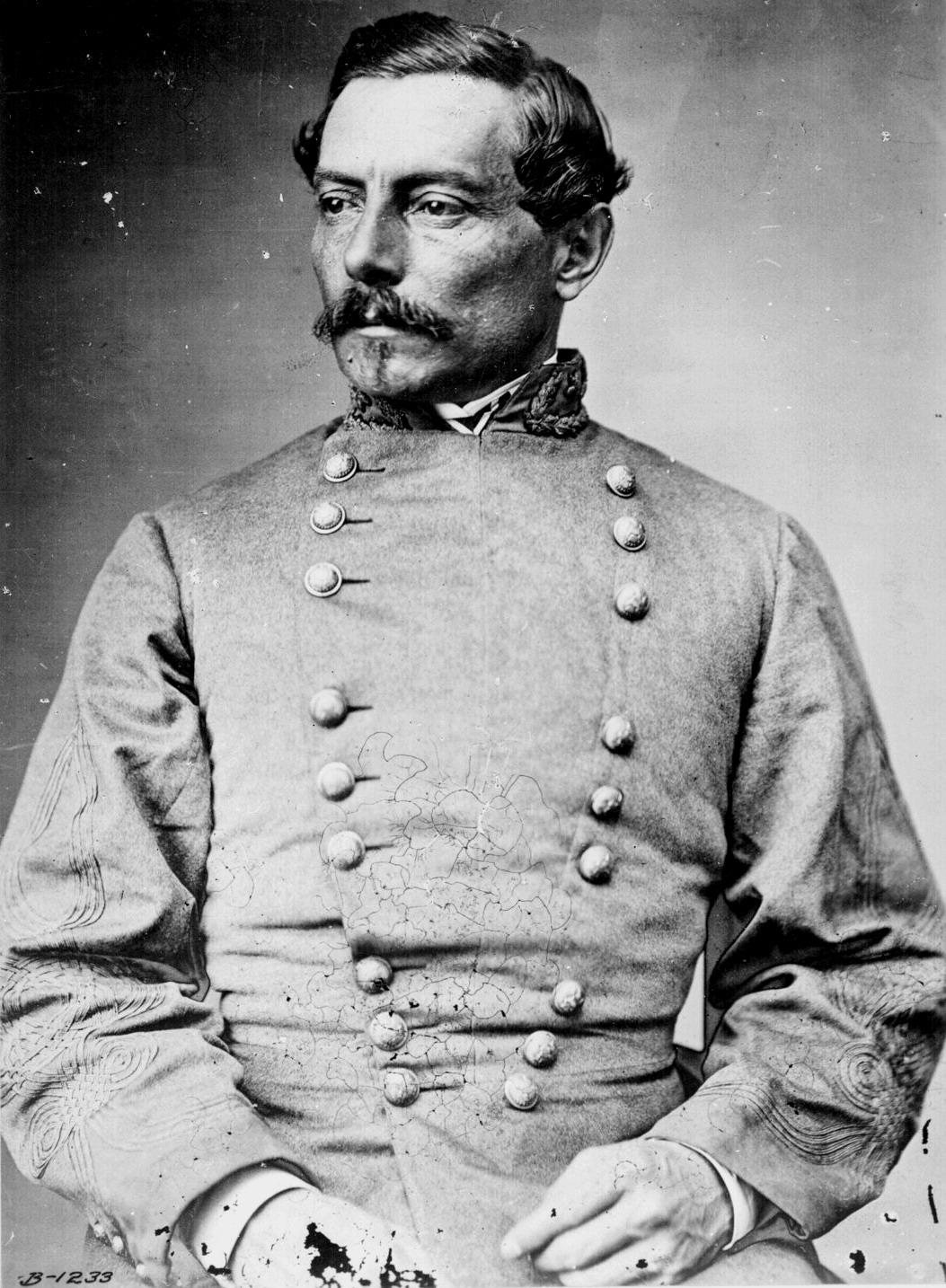
Gen.
P.G.T. Beauregard

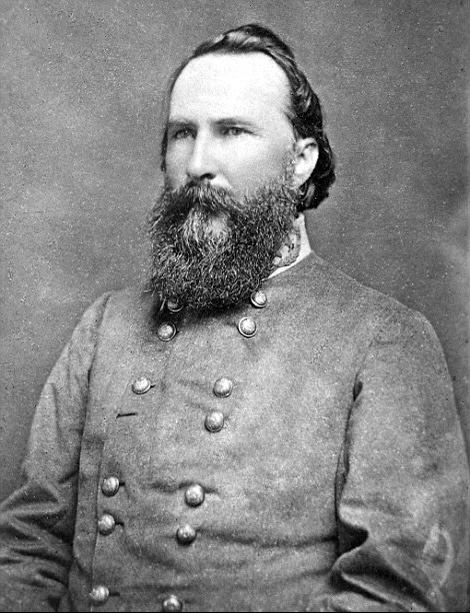
Lt. Gen.
James Longstreet

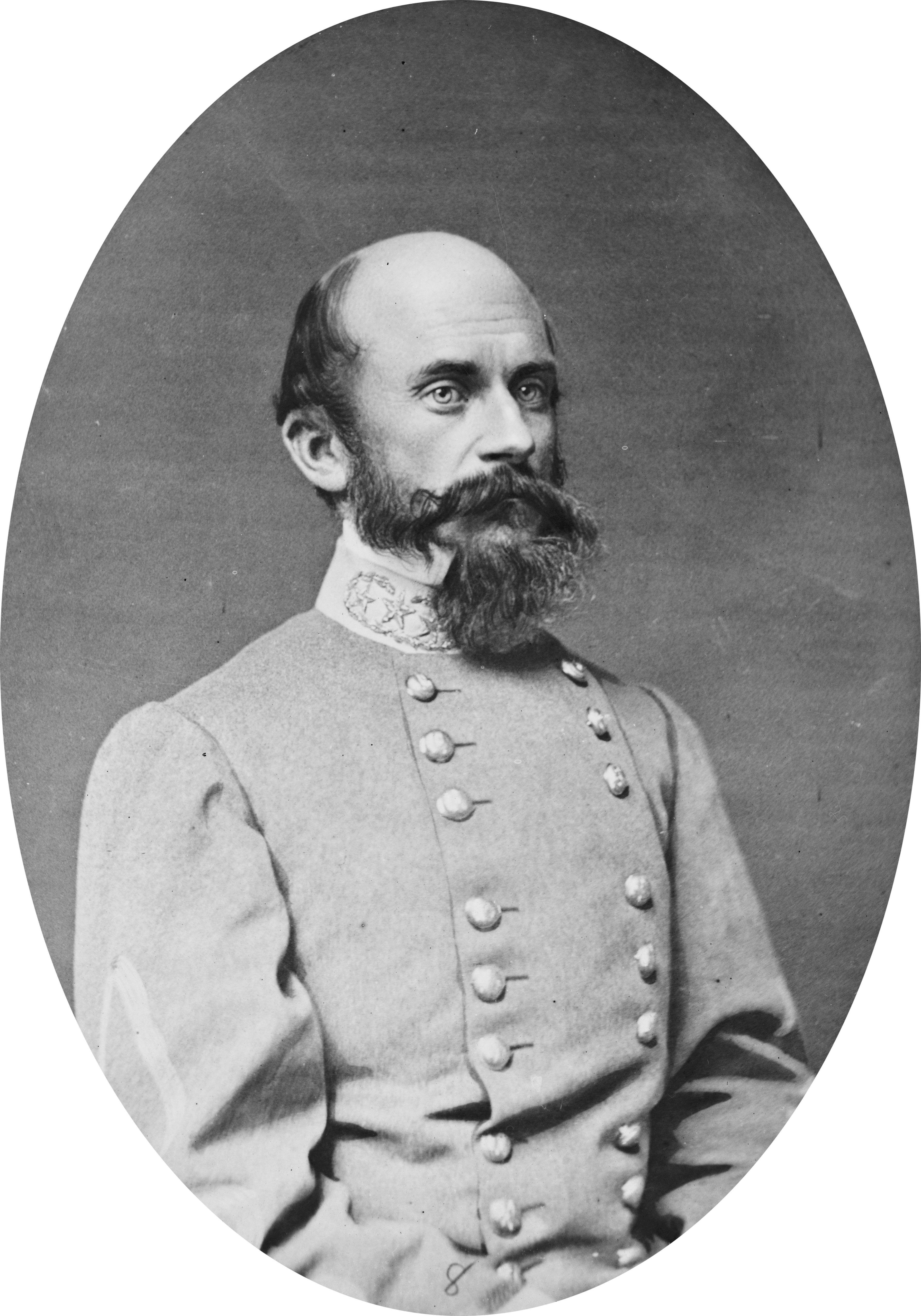
Lt. Gen.
Richard S. Ewell

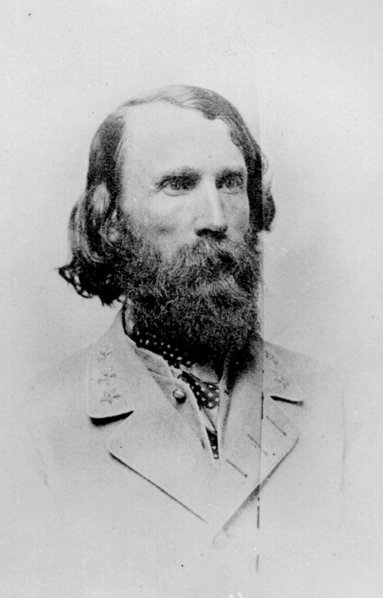
Lt. Gen.
A.P. Hill

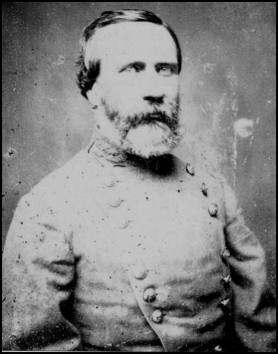
Lt. Gen.
Richard H. Anderson

Lee's Confederate force consisted of his own Army of Northern Virginia, as well as a scattered, disorganized group of 10,000 men defending Richmond under Beauregard. Many of the men under Beauregard's command consisted of soldiers who were either too young or too old to fight in the Army of Northern Virginia, or men who had been discharged from Lee's army due to wounds that rendered them unfit for service. The Army of Northern Virginia was initially organized into four corps:

- First Corps, under Lt. Gen. Richard H. Anderson, including the divisions of Maj. Gens. George E. Pickett, Charles W. Field, and Joseph B. Kershaw. Lt. Gen. James Longstreet returned from medical leave and resumed command of the corps on October 19. Anderson was given command of the new Fourth Corps, which included the division of Maj. Gen. Bushrod R. Johnson.
- Second Corps, under Lt. Gen. Jubal A. Early, was detached on June 12 for operations in the Shenandoah Valley and played no direct role in the defense of Petersburg.
- Third Corps, under Lt. Gen. A.P. Hill, including the divisions of Maj. Gens. Henry Heth and Cadmus M. Wilcox and Brig. Gen. William Mahone.
- Cavalry Corps, under Maj. Gen. Wade Hampton, including the divisions of Maj. Gens. Fitzhugh Lee and W.H.F. "Rooney" Lee.

Beauregard's Department of North Carolina and Southern Virginia had four depleted divisions commanded by major generals Robert Ransom Jr., Robert F. Hoke, William H. C. Whiting, and Brigadier General Alfred H. Colquitt. (Later in the campaign, Beauregard's department was expanded and reorganized to consist of the divisions of major generals Hoke and Bushrod Johnson).

=== Comparison between Union and Confederate armies ===
Grant's armies were significantly larger than Lee's during the campaign, although the strengths varied. During the initial assaults on the city, 15,000 Federal troops faced about 5,400 men under Beauregard. By June 18, the Federal strength exceeded 67,000 against the Confederate 20,000. More typical of the full campaign was in mid-July, when 70,000 Union troops faced 36,000 Confederates around Petersburg, and 40,000 men under Butler faced 21,000 around Richmond. The Union Army, despite suffering horrific losses during the Overland Campaign, was able to replenish its soldiers and equipment, taking advantage of garrison troops from Washington, D.C., and the increasing availability of African-American soldiers. By the end of the siege, Grant had 125,000 men to begin the Appomattox campaign. The Confederate army, in contrast, had difficulty replacing men lost through battle, disease, and desertion. As a result of this severe lack of manpower facing the Confederates, when Beauregard's men occupied the trenches around the city, there were gaps in the line of up to 5 feet (1.5 m) between men.

== Role of African Americans ==
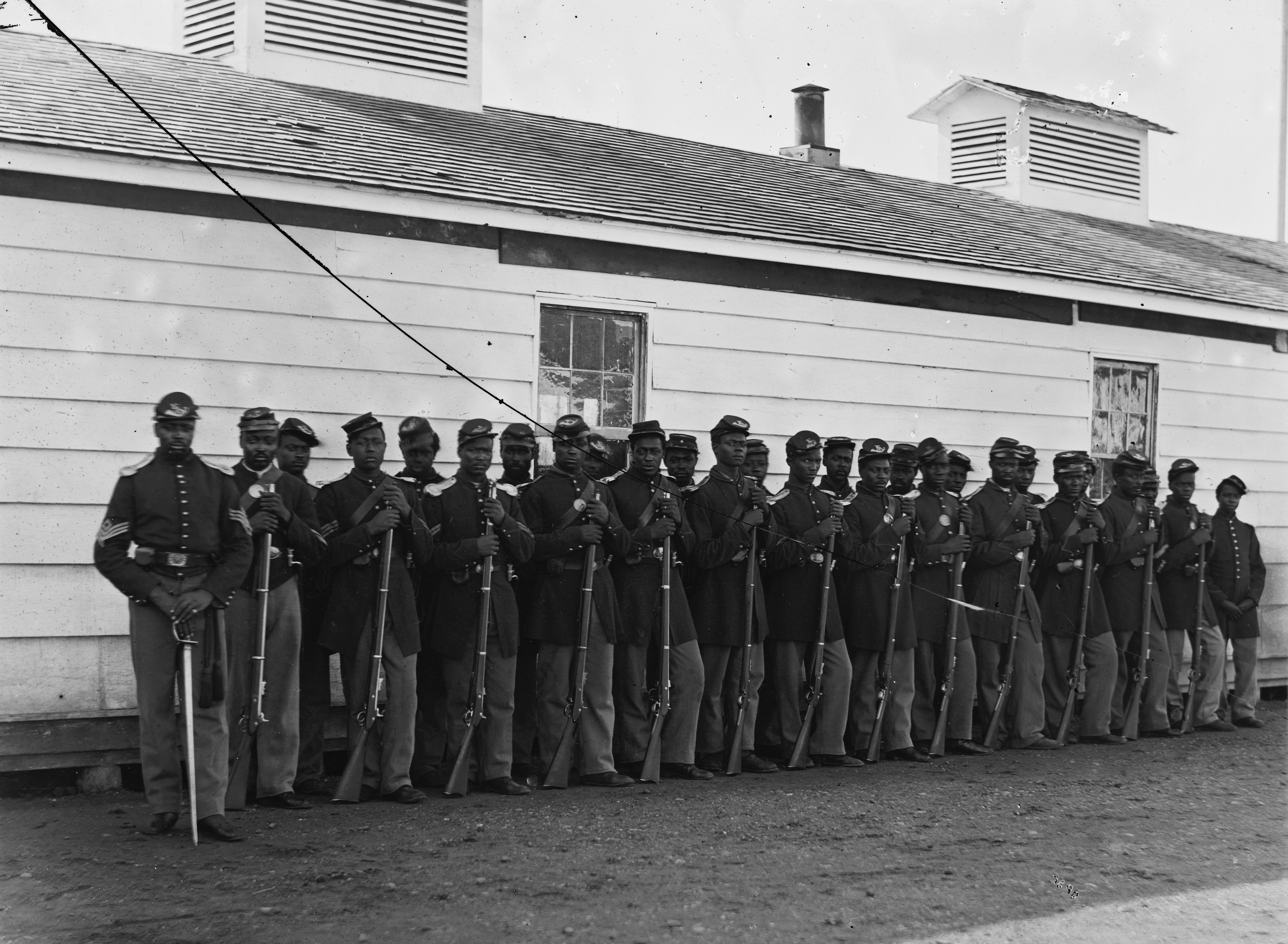
A portion of the 4th USCT Infantry

At the siege of Petersburg in June 1864, enslaved African Americans worked on digging trenches and other manual labor on behalf of the Confederacy, while African Americans fought in the Union Army of the Potomac as soldiers of the United States Colored Troops.

=== In Petersburg ===
At the beginning of the American Civil War, Virginia had a black population of about 549,000. This meant that of the Confederacy's total black population, one in six blacks lived in Virginia. Of those African Americans in Virginia 89% were slaves. In Petersburg about half the population was black of which nearly 35% were free. Petersburg was considered to have the largest number of free blacks of any Southern city at that time. Many of the freedmen prospered there as barbers, blacksmiths, boatmen, draymen, livery stable keepers, and caterers.

=== Serving the Confederacy ===
When Petersburg became a major supply center for the newly formed Confederacy and its nearby capital in Richmond, both freedmen and slaves were employed in various war functions, one of which was working for the numerous railroad companies that operated in and out of the city. In 1862 Captain Charles Dimmock used freedmen and slave labor to construct a ten-mile long defensive line of trenches and batteries around the city.

Once the siege began in June, African Americans continued working for the Confederacy. In September, Lee asked for an additional 2,000 blacks to be added to his labor force. On January 11, 1865, Lee wrote the Confederate Congress urging them to pass pending legislation to arm and enlist black slaves in exchange for their freedom. On March 13, the Confederate Congress passed legislation to raise and enlist companies of black soldiers. The legislation was then promulgated into military policy by Davis in General Order No. 14 on March 23. The emancipation offered, however, was still reliant upon one's master agreement; "no slave will be accepted as a recruit unless with his own consent and with the approbation of his master by a written instrument conferring, as far as he may, the rights of a freedman".

=== Serving the Union ===
During the war a total of nearly 187,000 African Americans served in the Union Army. Of those the greatest concentration of U.S. Colored Troops was at Petersburg. In the initial assault upon the city on June 15, a division of USCTs in the XVIII Corps helped capture and secure a section of the Dimmock line. The other division at Petersburg was with the IX Corps and it fought in the Battle of the Crater, July 30.

In December, all the USCTs around Petersburg were incorporated into three divisions and became the XXV Corps of the Army of the James. It was the largest black force assembled during the war and varied between 9,000 and 16,000 men. Overall in the Petersburg Campaign USCTs would participate in 6 major engagements and earn 15 of the 25 total Medals of Honor that were awarded to African American soldiers in the Civil War.

=== At City Point ===
African Americans served in varying capacities at the Union supply base at City Point. They served as pickets, railroad workers, and laborers "discharging the ships, wheeling the dirt, sawing the timber and driving the piles." Many also worked at the Depot Field Hospital as cooks.

== Initial attempts to capture Petersburg ==
=== Butler's assault (June 9) ===
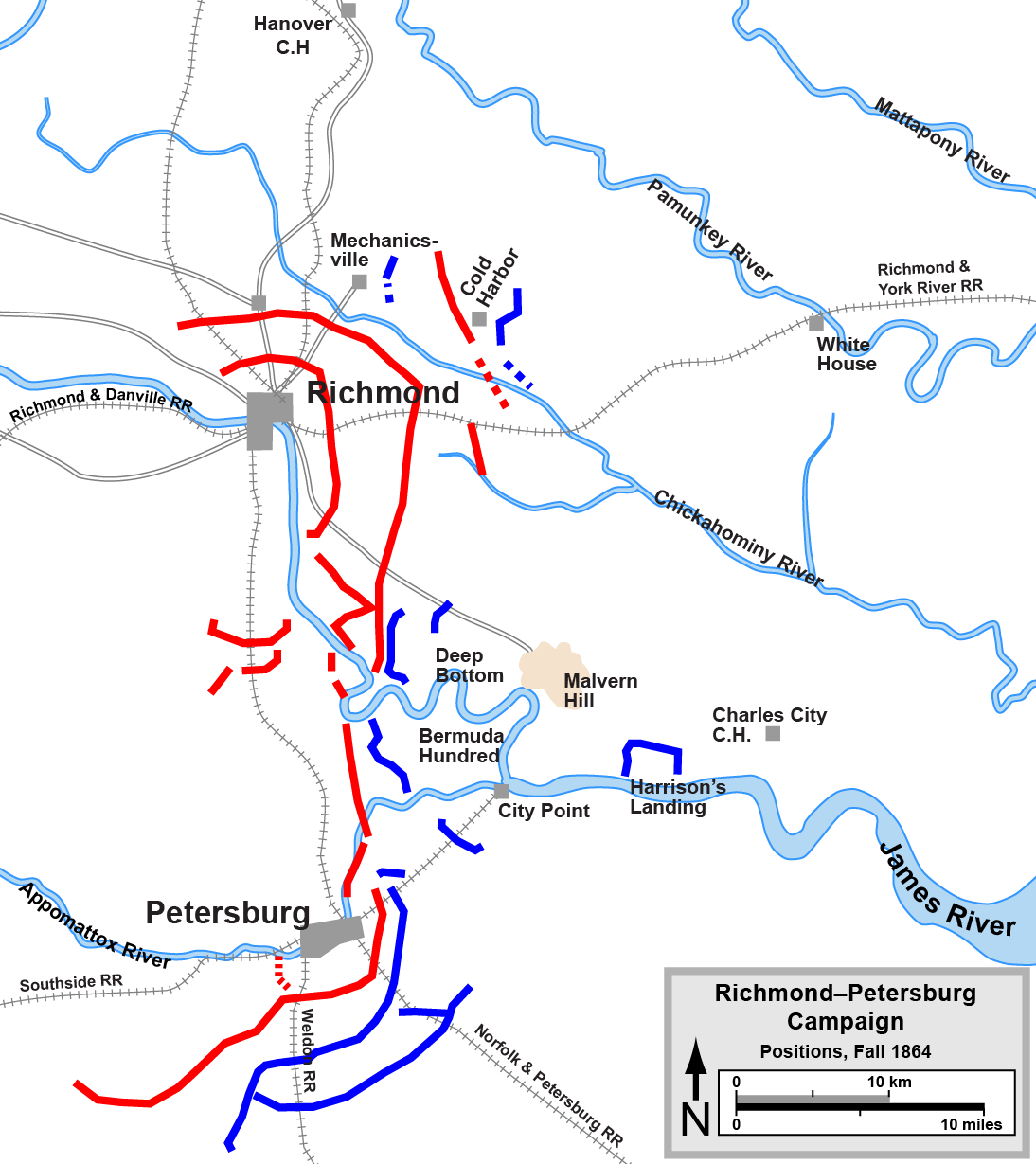
Richmond–Petersburg Theater, fall 1864 Confederate Union

While Lee and Grant faced each other after Cold Harbor, Benjamin Butler became aware that Confederate troops had been moving north to reinforce Lee, leaving the defenses of Petersburg in a vulnerable state. Sensitive to his failure in the Bermuda Hundred campaign, Butler sought to achieve a success to vindicate his generalship. He wrote, "the capture of Petersburg lay near my heart."

Petersburg was protected by multiple lines of fortifications, the outermost of which was known as the Dimmock line, a line of earthworks and trenches 10 miles (16 km) long, east of the city, including 55 artillery batteries, and anchored on the river. The 2,500 Confederates stretched thin along this defensive line were commanded by a former Virginia governor, Brigadier General Henry A. Wise. Despite the number of fortifications, because of a series of hills and valleys around the outskirts of Petersburg there were several places along the outer defenses where cavalry could easily ride through undetected until they reached the inner defenses of the city.

Butler's plan was formulated on the afternoon of June 8, calling for three columns to cross the Appomattox and advance with 4,500 men. The first and second consisted of infantry from Gillmore's X Corps and USCTs from Hinks's 3rd Division of XVIII Corps, which was to attack the Dimmock line east of the city. The third was 1,300 cavalrymen under Kautz, who were to sweep around Petersburg and strike it from the southeast. The troops moved out on the night of June 8, but made poor progress. Eventually the infantry crossed by 3:40 a.m. on June 9 and by 7 a.m., both Gillmore and Hinks had encountered the enemy, but stopped at their fronts. Gillmore told Hinks that he would attack but that both of the infantry columns should await the cavalry assault from the south.

Kautz's men did not arrive until noon, however, having been delayed en route by numerous enemy pickets. They assaulted the Dimmock line where it crossed the Jerusalem Plank Road (present-day U.S. Route 301, Crater Road). The Confederates' Battery 27, also known as Rives's Salient, was manned by 150 militiamen commanded by Major Fletcher H. Archer. Kautz first launched a probing attack, then paused. His main attack was by the 11th Pennsylvania Cavalry against the home guard, a group consisting primarily of teenagers, elderly men, and some wounded soldiers from city hospitals. The home guards retreated to the city with heavy losses, but by this time Beauregard had been able to bring reinforcements from Richmond to bear, which were able to repulse the Union assault. Kautz, hearing no activity on Gillmore's front, presumed that he was left on his own and withdrew. Confederate casualties were about 80, Union 40. Butler was furious with Gillmore's timidity and incompetence and arrested him. Gillmore requested a court of inquiry, which was never convened, but Grant later reassigned him and the incident was dropped.

=== Meade's assaults (June 15–18, 1864) ===
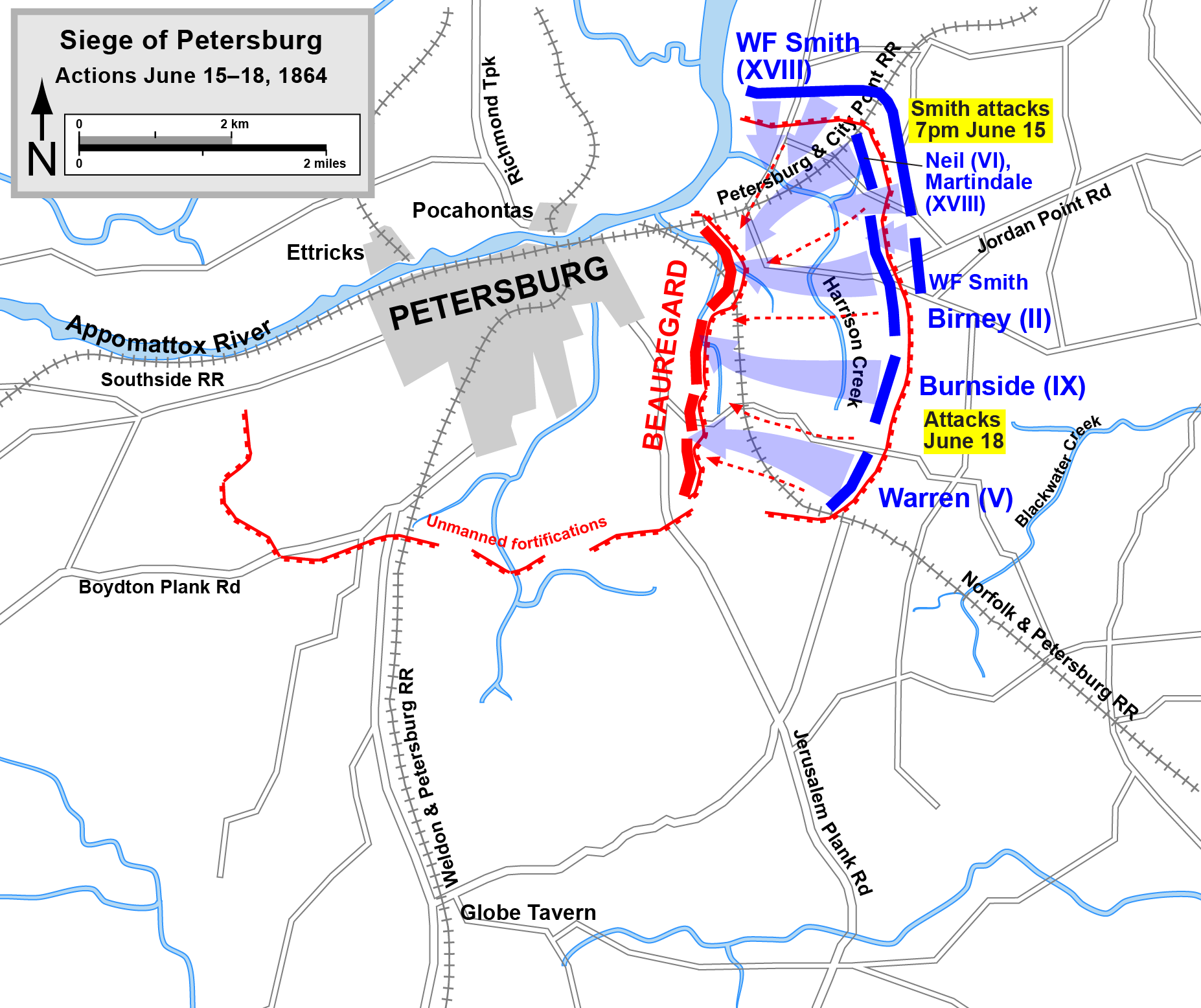
Siege of Petersburg, assaults on June 15–18

Grant selected Butler's Army of the James, which had performed poorly in the Bermuda Hundred campaign, to lead the expedition toward Petersburg. On June 14 he directed Butler to augment the XVIII Corps, commanded by Smith, to a strength of 16,000 men, including Kautz's cavalry division, and use the same route employed in the unsuccessful attacks of June 9. Since Beauregard had insufficient men available to defend the entire Dimmock defensive line, he concentrated 2,200 troops under Wise in the northeastern sector. Even with this concentration, infantrymen were spaced an unacceptable 10 feet (3.0 m) apart. His remaining 3,200 men were facing Butler's army at Bermuda Hundred.

Smith and his men crossed the Appomattox shortly after dawn on June 15. Kautz's cavalry, leading the advance, encountered an unexpected stronghold at Baylor's farm northeast of Petersburg. Hinks's men launched two attacks on the Confederates and captured a cannon, but the overall advance was delayed until early afternoon. Smith started his attack after delaying until about 7 p.m., deploying a strong skirmish line that swept over the earthworks on a 3.5-mile (5.6 km) front, causing the Confederates to retreat to a weaker defensive line on Harrison's Creek. Despite this initial success and the prospect of a virtually undefended city immediately to his front, Smith decided to wait until dawn to resume his attack. By this time Hancock, the II Corps commander, had arrived at Smith's headquarters. The normally decisive and pugnacious Hancock, who outranked Smith, was uncertain of his orders and the disposition of forces, and uncharacteristically deferred to Smith's judgment to wait.

Beauregard wrote later that Petersburg "at that hour was clearly at the mercy of the Federal commander, who had all but captured it." But he used the time he had been granted to good advantage. Receiving no guidance from Richmond in response to his urgent requests, he unilaterally decided to strip his defenses from the Howlett defensive line, which was bottling up Butler's army in Bermuda Hundred. This made the divisions under Hoke and Johnson available for the new Petersburg defensive line. Butler might have used this opportunity to move his army between Petersburg and Richmond, which would have doomed the Confederate capital, but he once again failed to act.

By the morning of June 16, Beauregard had concentrated about 14,000 men in his defensive line, but this paled in comparison to the 50,000 Federals that now faced him. Grant had arrived with Burnside's IX Corps, addressed the confusion of Hancock's orders, and ordered a reconnaissance for weak points in the defensive line. Hancock, in temporary command of the Army of the Potomac until Meade arrived, prepared Smith's XVIII corps on the right, his own II Corps in the center, and Burnside's IX Corps on the left. Hancock's assault began around 5:30 p.m. as all three corps moved slowly forward. Beauregard's men fought fiercely, erecting new breastworks to the rear as breakthroughs occurred. Upon the arrival of Meade, a second attack was ordered and led his division forward. Although Barlow's men managed to capture their objectives, a counterattack drove them back, taking numerous Union prisoners. The survivors dug in close to the enemy works.

June 17 was a day of uncoordinated Union attacks, starting on the left flank where two brigades of Burnside's IX Corps under Potter stealthily approached the Confederate line and launched a surprise attack at dawn. Initially successful, it captured nearly a mile of the Confederate fortifications and about 600 prisoners, but the effort eventually failed when Potter's men moved forward to find another line of entrenchments. IX Corps assaults at 2 p.m., led by the brigade of Brigadier General John F. Hartranft, and in the evening, by Ledlie's division, both failed.

During the day, Beauregard's engineers had laid out new defensive positions a mile to the west of the Dimmock line, which the Confederates occupied late that night. Lee had systematically ignored all of Beauregard's pleas for reinforcements until now, but dispatched two divisions of his men, exhausted from the Overland campaign, to Petersburg, beginning at 3 a.m. on June 18. With the arrival of Lee's two divisions, under Kershaw and Field, Beauregard had over 20,000 men to defend the city, but Grant's force had been augmented by the arrival of Warren's V Corps and 67,000 Federals were present.

On the morning of June 18, Meade went into a rage directed at his corps commanders because of his army's failure to take the initiative and break through the thinly defended Confederate positions and seize the city. He ordered the entire Army of the Potomac to attack the Confederate defenses. The first Union attack began at dawn, started by the II and XVIII Corps on the Union right. The II Corps was surprised to make rapid progress against the Confederate line, not realizing that Beauregard had moved it back the night before. When they encountered the second line, the attack immediately ground to a halt and the corps suffered under heavy Confederate fire for hours.

By noon, another attack plan had been devised to break through the Confederate defenses. However, by this time, elements of Lee's army had reinforced Beauregard's troops. By the time the Union attack was renewed, Lee himself had taken command of the defenses. Willcox's division of the IX Corps led the renewed attack but it suffered significant losses in the marsh and open fields crossed by the watercourse, Taylor's Branch. Warren's V Corps was halted by murderous fire from the position known as Rives' salient, an attack in which Colonel Joshua Lawrence Chamberlain, commanding the 1st Brigade, First Division, V Corps, was severely wounded. At 6:30 p.m., Meade ordered a final assault, which also failed with more horrendous losses. One of the leading regiments was the 1st Maine Heavy Artillery Regiment, which lost 632 of 900 men in the assault, the heaviest single-battle loss of any regiment during the entire war.

Having achieved almost no gains from four days of assaults, and with Lincoln facing re-election in the upcoming months in the face of a loud public outcry against the casualty figures, Meade ordered his army to dig in, starting the ten-month siege. During the four days of fighting, Union casualties were 11,386 (1,688 killed, 8,513 wounded, 1,185 missing or captured), while Confederate casualties were 4,000 (200 killed, 2,900 wounded, 900 missing or captured).

== Initial attempts to cut the railroads (June 21–30) ==
After failing to capture Petersburg by assault, Grant's first objective was to secure the three remaining open rail lines that served Petersburg and Richmond: the Richmond and Petersburg Railroad; the South Side Railroad, which reached to Lynchburg in the west; and the Weldon Railroad, also called the Petersburg and Weldon Railroad, which led to Weldon, North Carolina, and the Confederacy's only remaining major port, Wilmington, North Carolina. Grant decided on a wide-ranging cavalry raid (the Wilson–Kautz Raid) against the South Side and Weldon railroads, but he also directed that a significant infantry force be sent against the Weldon closer to his current position. Meade selected the II Corps, still temporarily commanded by Birney, and Wright's VI Corps.

=== Jerusalem Plank Road (June 21–23) ===
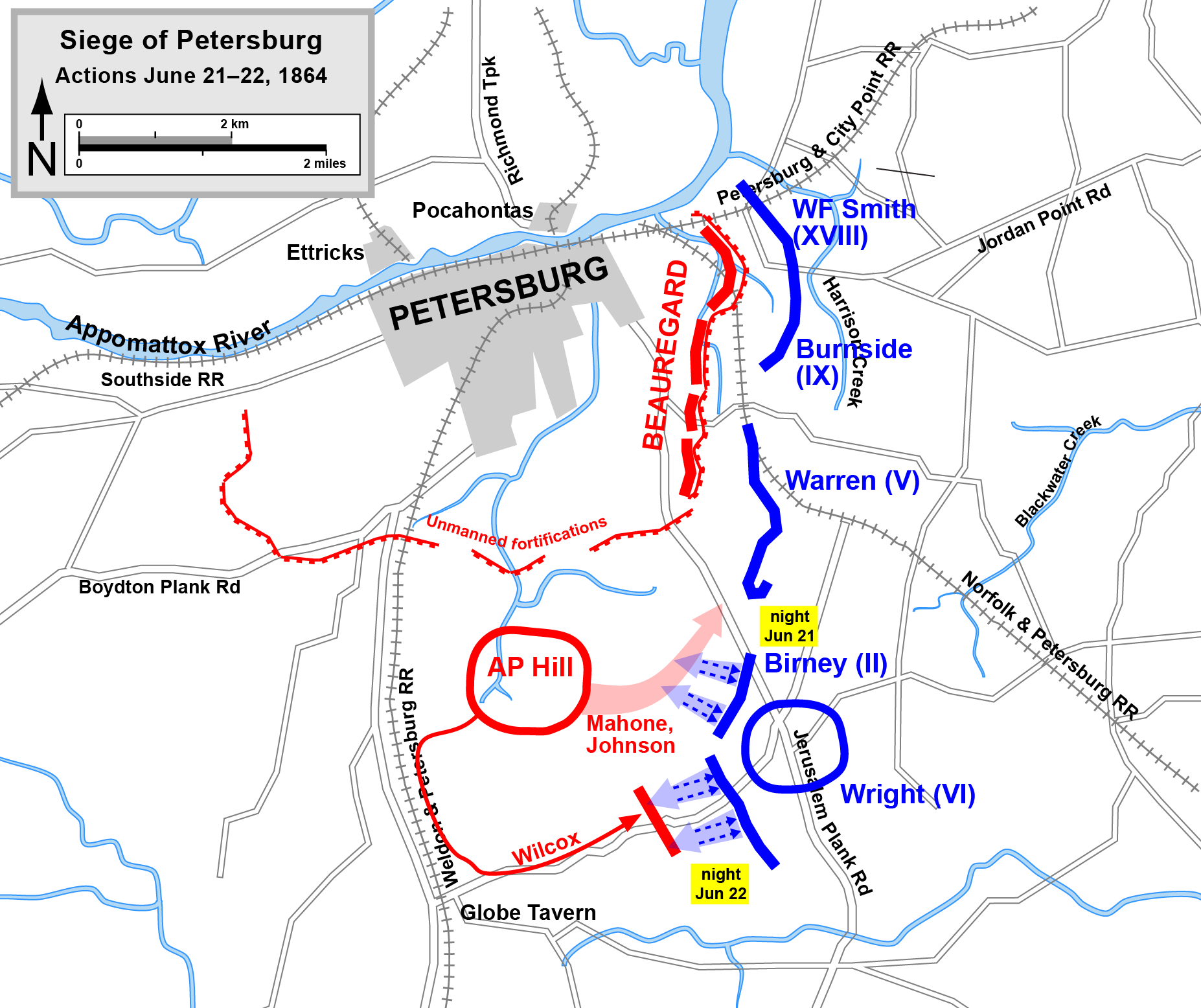
Siege of Petersburg, movements against the railroads and A.P. Hill's counterattack, June 21–22

On June 21, elements of the II Corps probed toward the railroad and skirmished with Confederate cavalry. By the morning of June 22, a gap opened up between the two corps. While the II Corps moved forward, the VI Corps encountered Confederate troops from Wilcox's division of Hill's corps and they began to entrench rather than advance. Mahone observed that the gap between the two Union corps was widening, creating a prime target. Mahone had been a railroad engineer before the war and had personally surveyed this area south of Petersburg, so he was familiar with a ravine that could be used to hide the approach of a Confederate attack column. At 3 p.m., Mahone's men emerged in the rear Barlow's division (II Corps), catching them by surprise, and the division quickly collapsed. Gibbon's division, which had erected earthworks, was also surprised by an attack from the rear and many of the regiments ran for safety. The II Corps troops rallied around earthworks that they had constructed on the night of June 21 and stabilized their lines. Darkness ended the fighting.

On June 23, the II Corps advanced to retake its lost ground, but the Confederates had pulled back, abandoning the earthworks they had captured. Under orders from Meade, the VI Corps sent out a heavy skirmish line after 10 a.m. in a second attempt to reach the Weldon Railroad. Men from Brigadier General Lewis A. Grant's 1st Vermont Brigade had begun tearing up the track when they were attacked by a larger force of Confederate infantry. Numerous Vermonters were taken prisoner and only about half a mile of track had been destroyed when they were chased away. Meade was unable to urge Wright forward and called off the operation. Union casualties were 2,962 and Confederate 572. The battle was inconclusive, with advantages gained on both sides. The Confederates were able to retain control of the Weldon Railroad. The Federals were able to destroy a short segment of the Weldon before being driven off, but more importantly, the siege lines were stretched further to the west.

=== Wilson–Kautz Raid (June 22 – July 1) ===
Wilson–Kautz Raid, June 22 – July 1

In parallel to Birney's and Wright's infantry action at the Jerusalem Plank Road, Wilson was ordered by Meade to conduct a raid destroying as much track as possible south and southwest of Petersburg. Grant considered Wilson's 3rd Division of the Cavalry Corps too small to conduct the operation alone, particularly since Meade required Wilson to leave 1,400 men behind for picket duty, so he directed Butler to contribute Kautz's small division (2,000 troopers) to the effort. Early on the morning of June 22, 3,300 men, and 12 guns organized into two batteries, departed Mount Sinai Church and began to destroy railroad track and cars of the Weldon Railroad at Reams Station, 7 miles (11 km) south of Petersburg. Kautz's men moved to the west to Ford's Station and began destroying track, locomotives, and cars on the South Side Railroad.

On June 23, Wilson proceeded to the junction of the Richmond and Danville Railroad at Burkeville, where he encountered elements of Rooney Lee's cavalry between Nottoway Court House and Black's and White's (modern-day Blackstone). The Confederates struck the rear of his column, forcing Colonel George A. Chapman's brigade to fend them off. Wilson followed Kautz along the South Side Railroad, destroying about 30 miles (50 km) of track as they went. On June 24, while Kautz remained to skirmish around Burkeville, Wilson crossed over to Meherrin Station on the Richmond and Danville and began destroying track.

On June 25, Wilson and Kautz continued tearing up track south to the Staunton River Bridge at Roanoke Station (modern-day Randolph), where they encountered approximately 1,000 "old men and boys" (the Home Guard), commanded by Captain Benjamin L. Farinholt, dug in with earthworks and prepared artillery positions at the bridge. The Battle of Staunton River Bridge was a minor affair in which Kautz attempted multiple frontal assaults against the Home Guard, but his men never came closer than 80 yards (73 m). Lee's cavalry division closed on the Federals from the northeast and skirmished with Wilson's rear guard. Casualties on the Union side amounted to 42 killed, 44 wounded, and 30 missing or captured. Confederate losses were 10 killed and 24 wounded. Kautz's men gave up and retreated to the railroad depot at 9 p.m. Despite these relatively minor losses, the two Union cavalry generals decided to abandon their mission, leaving the Staunton River bridge intact and having inflicted only minor damage on the railroads.

As Wilson and Kautz turned back to the east after their defeat at Staunton River Bridge, Lee's cavalry pursued and threatened their rear. Meanwhile, Robert E. Lee ordered Hampton's cavalry, which had been engaged with Sheridan's cavalry at the Battle of Trevilian Station on June 11–12, to join the pursuit and attack Wilson and Kautz. Before leaving on his raid, Wilson had received assurances from Meade's chief of staff, Major General Andrew A. Humphreys, that the Army of the Potomac would be immediately taking control of the Weldon Railroad at least as far south as Reams Station, so Wilson decided that would be an appropriate place to return to Union lines. The Union defeat at Jerusalem Plank Road made those assurances inoperable. Wilson and Kautz were surprised on the afternoon of June 28 when they reached Stony Creek Station, 10 miles (16 km) south of Reams, as hundreds of Hampton's cavalrymen (under Brigadier General John R. Chambliss) and infantry blocked their path. In the Battle of Sappony Church, Wilson's men tried to break through but had to fall back when Confederate brigadier generals Matthew C. Butler and Thomas L. Rosser threatened to envelop Wilson's left flank. Kautz's division, following Wilson's, took a back road in the direction of Reams Station and was attacked by Lee's division late in the day. The Union cavalrymen were able to slip out of the trap under the cover of darkness and rode north on the Halifax Road for the supposed security of Reams Station.

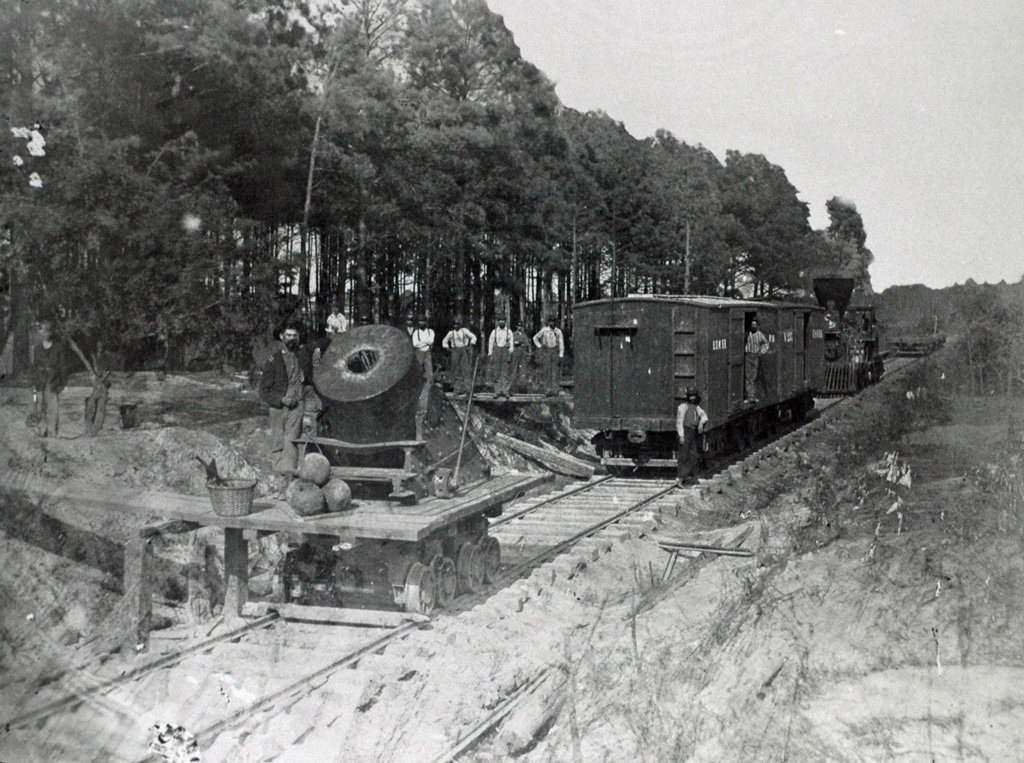
"Dictator" siege mortar on the U.S. Military Railroad at Petersburg

In the First Battle of Reams Station on June 29, Kautz approached Reams Station from the west expecting to find the friendly infantry promised by Humphreys but found Confederate infantry instead—Mahone's division blocking the approaches to the Halifax Road and the railroad behind well-constructed earthworks. Kautz's attack by the 11th Pennsylvania and the 1st District of Columbia Cavalry along the Depot Road was unsuccessful and Mahone counterattacked against the flank of the Pennsylvanians. On the Stage Road to the north of the station, the brigades of brigadier generals Lunsford L. Lomax and Williams C. Wickham maneuvered around the 2nd Ohio Cavalry and 5th New York Cavalry, turning the Federal left flank. Wilson sent a messenger north who was able to slip through the Confederate lines and urgently requested help from Meade at City Point. Meade alerted Wright to prepare to move his entire VI Corps to Reams Station, but he realized that it would take too long on foot and requested help from Sheridan's cavalry as well. Sheridan demurred, complaining of the effect on his "worn-out horses and exhausted men." After the war, arguments persisted between Sheridan and Wilson about whether the former had adequately protected the raiders from the Confederate cavalry of Hampton and Fitzhugh Lee. Sheridan did reach Reams Station by 7 p.m., only to find that the VI Corps infantry had in fact arrived but that Wilson and Kautz had departed.

Caught in a trap without the promise of immediate aid, the Wilson–Kautz raiders burned their wagons and destroyed their artillery pieces and fled to the north before the reinforcements arrived. They lost hundreds of men as prisoners in what was called "a wild skedaddle." At least 300 escaped slaves who had joined the Union cavalrymen during the raid were abandoned during the retreat. The raiders reentered Federal lines around 2 p.m. on July 1. They had destroyed 60 miles (97 km) of track, which took the Confederates several weeks to repair, but it came at the cost of 1,445 Union casualties, or about a quarter of their force. Wilson lost 33 killed, 108 wounded, and 674 captured or missing. Kautz lost 48 killed, 153 wounded, and 429 captured or missing. Although Wilson counted the raid as a strategic success, Grant reluctantly described the expedition as a "disaster."

== First Battle of Deep Bottom (July 27–29) ==
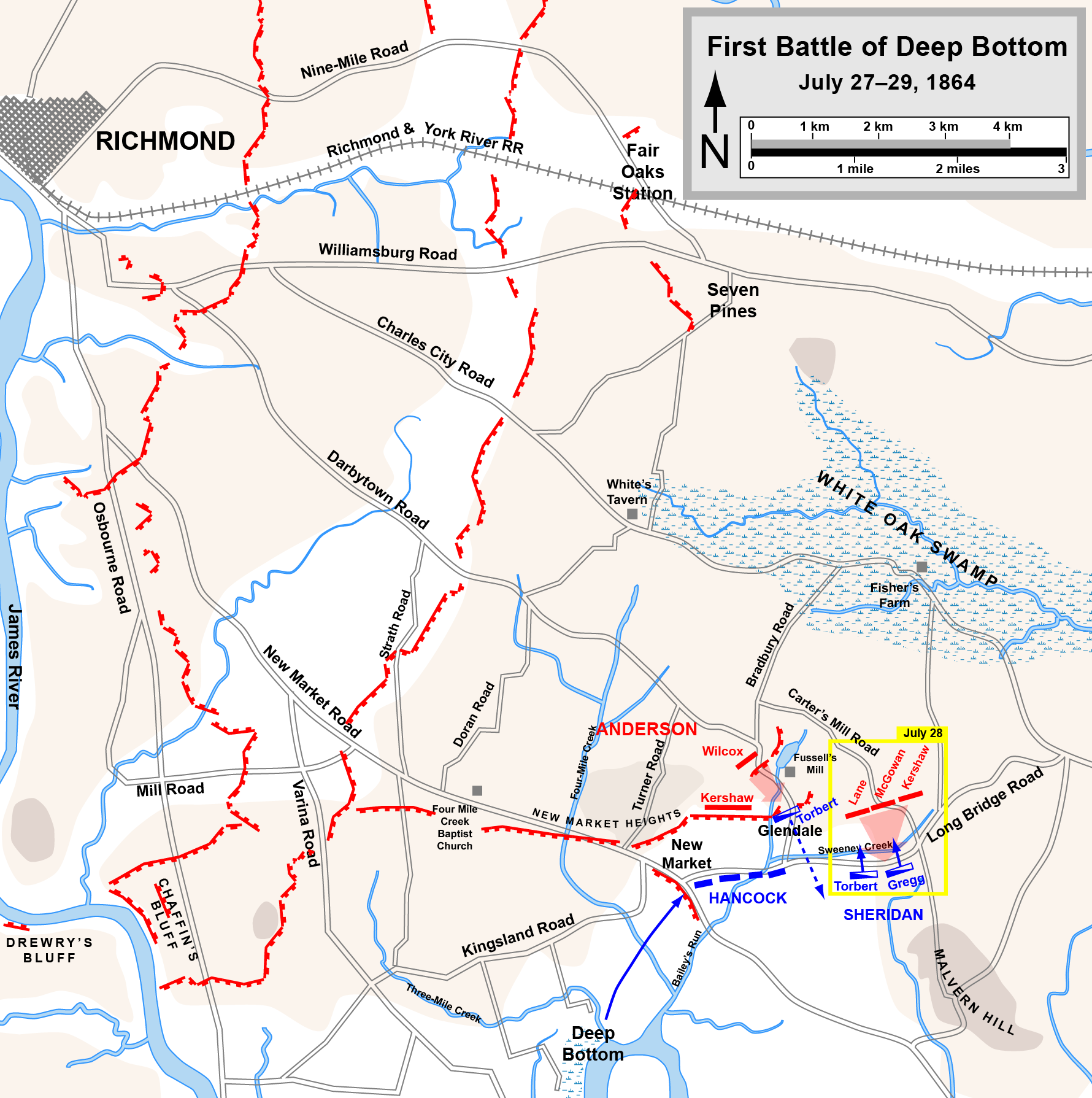
First Battle of Deep Bottom, July 27–29

In preparation for the forthcoming Battle of the Crater, Grant wanted Lee to dilute his forces in the Petersburg trenches by attracting them elsewhere. He ordered Hancock's II Corps and two divisions of Sheridan's Cavalry Corps to cross the James River to Deep Bottom by pontoon bridge and advance against the Confederate capital. His plan called for Hancock to pin down the Confederates at Chaffin's Bluff and prevent reinforcements from opposing Sheridan's cavalry, which would attack Richmond if practicable. If not—a circumstance Grant considered more likely—Sheridan was ordered to ride around the city to the north and west and cut the Virginia Central Railroad, which was supplying Richmond from the Shenandoah Valley.

When Lee found out about Hancock's pending movement, he ordered that the Richmond lines be reinforced to 16,500 men. Kershaw's division and brigades from Wilcox's division moved east on New Market Road and took up positions on the eastern face of New Market Heights. Hancock and Sheridan crossed the pontoon bridge starting at 3 a.m., July 27. II Corps took up positions on the east bank of Bailey's Creek, from New Market Road to near Fussell's Mill. Sheridan's cavalry captured the high ground on the right, overlooking the millpond, but they were counterattacked and driven back. The Confederate works on the west bank of Bailey's Creek were formidable and Hancock chose not to attack them, spending the rest of the day performing reconnaissance.

While Hancock was checked at Bailey's Creek, Lee began bringing up more reinforcements from Petersburg, reacting as Grant had hoped. He assigned Anderson to take command of the Deep Bottom sector and sent in Heth's infantry division "Rooney" Lee's cavalry division. Troops were also hurriedly detailed from the Department of Richmond to help man the trenches.

On the morning of July 28, Grant reinforced Hancock with a brigade of the XIX Corps. Sheridan's men attempted to turn the Confederate left, but their movement was disrupted by a Confederate attack. Three brigades attacked Sheridan's right flank, but they were unexpectedly hit by heavy fire from the Union repeating carbines. Mounted Federals in Sheridan's reserve pursued and captured nearly 200 prisoners.

Satisfied that the operation had distracted sufficient Confederate forces from the defense of Petersburg the Federal attacks ended in the afternoon of July 28. Grant then proceed with a renewed assault against Petersburg on July 30.

Union casualties at the First Battle of Deep Bottom were 488 (62 killed, 340 wounded, and 86 missing or captured). Confederate casualties were 679 (80 killed, 391 wounded, 208 missing or captured).

== The Crater (July 30) ==
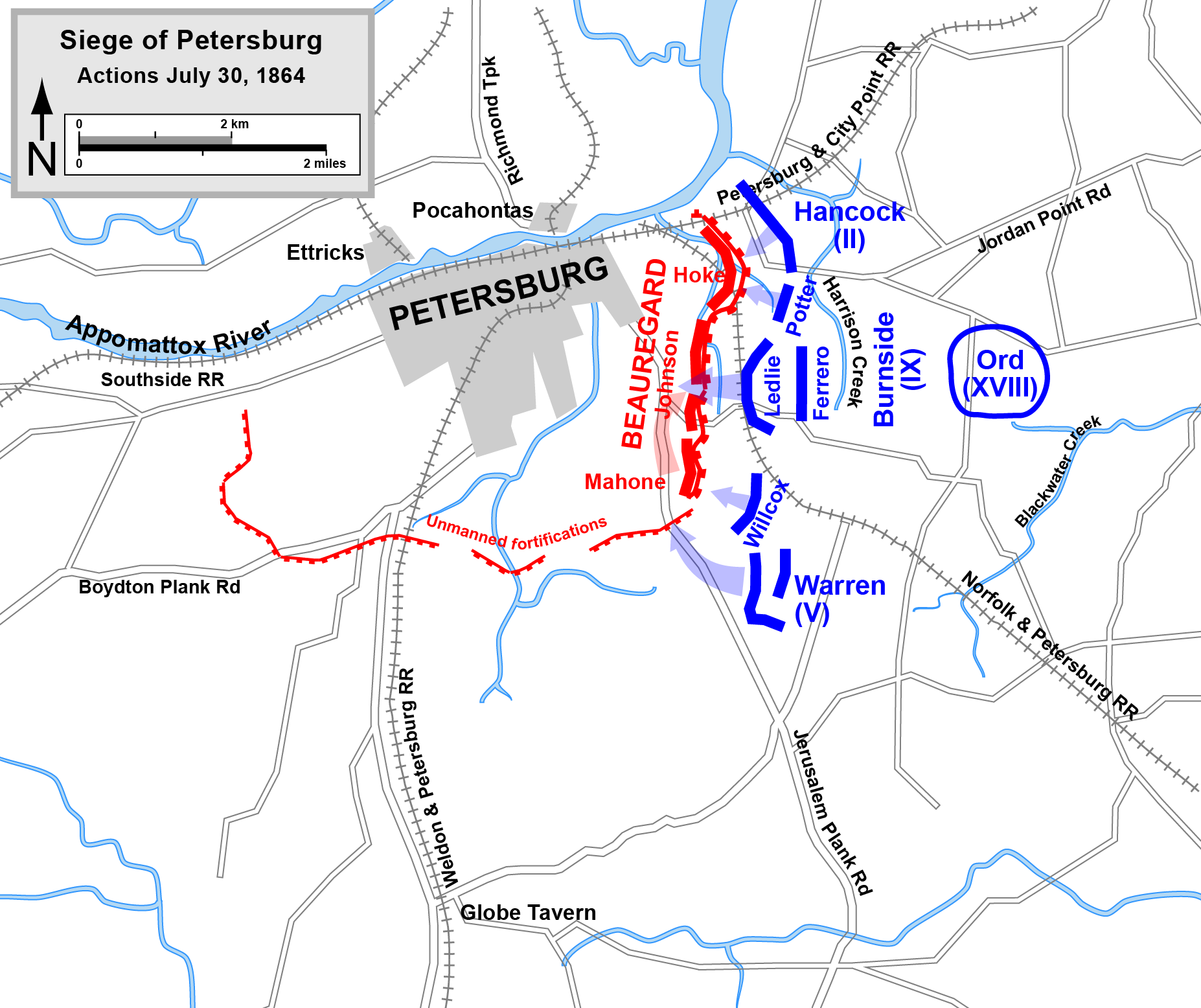
Siege of Petersburg, Battle of the Crater, July 30

Grant wanted to defeat Lee's army without resorting to a lengthy siege—his experience in the siege of Vicksburg told him that such affairs were expensive and difficult on the morale of his men. Lieutenant Colonel Henry Pleasants, commanding the 48th Pennsylvania Infantry of Burnside's IX Corps, offered a novel proposal to solve Grant's problem. Pleasants, a mining engineer from Pennsylvania in civilian life, proposed digging a long mine shaft underneath the Confederate lines and planting explosive charges directly underneath a fort (Elliott's Salient) in the middle of the Confederate First Corps line. If successful, Union troops could drive through the resulting gap in the line into the Confederate rear area. Digging began in late June, creating a mine in a "T" shape with an approach shaft 511 feet (156 m) long. At its end, a perpendicular gallery of 75 feet (23 m) extended in both directions. The gallery was filled with 8,000 pounds (3,600 kg) pounds of gunpowder, buried 20 feet (6.1 m) underneath the Confederate works.

Burnside had trained the division of USCTs under Ferrero to lead the assault. Two regiments were to leave the attack column and extend the breach by rushing perpendicular to the crater, while the remaining regiments were to rush through, seizing the Jerusalem Plank Road. Burnside's two other divisions, made up of white troops, would then move in, supporting Ferrero's flanks and race for Petersburg itself. However, the day before the attack, Meade, who lacked confidence in the operation, ordered Burnside not to use the black troops in the lead assault, claiming that if the attack failed black soldiers would be killed needlessly, creating political repercussions in the North. Burnside protested to Grant, who sided with Meade. When volunteers were not forthcoming, Burnside selected a replacement white division by having the three commanders draw lots. Ledlie's 1st Division was selected, but he failed to brief the men on what was expected of them. During the battle, Ledlie was reportedly drunk well behind the lines and providing no leadership. He was later dismissed for his actions during the battle.

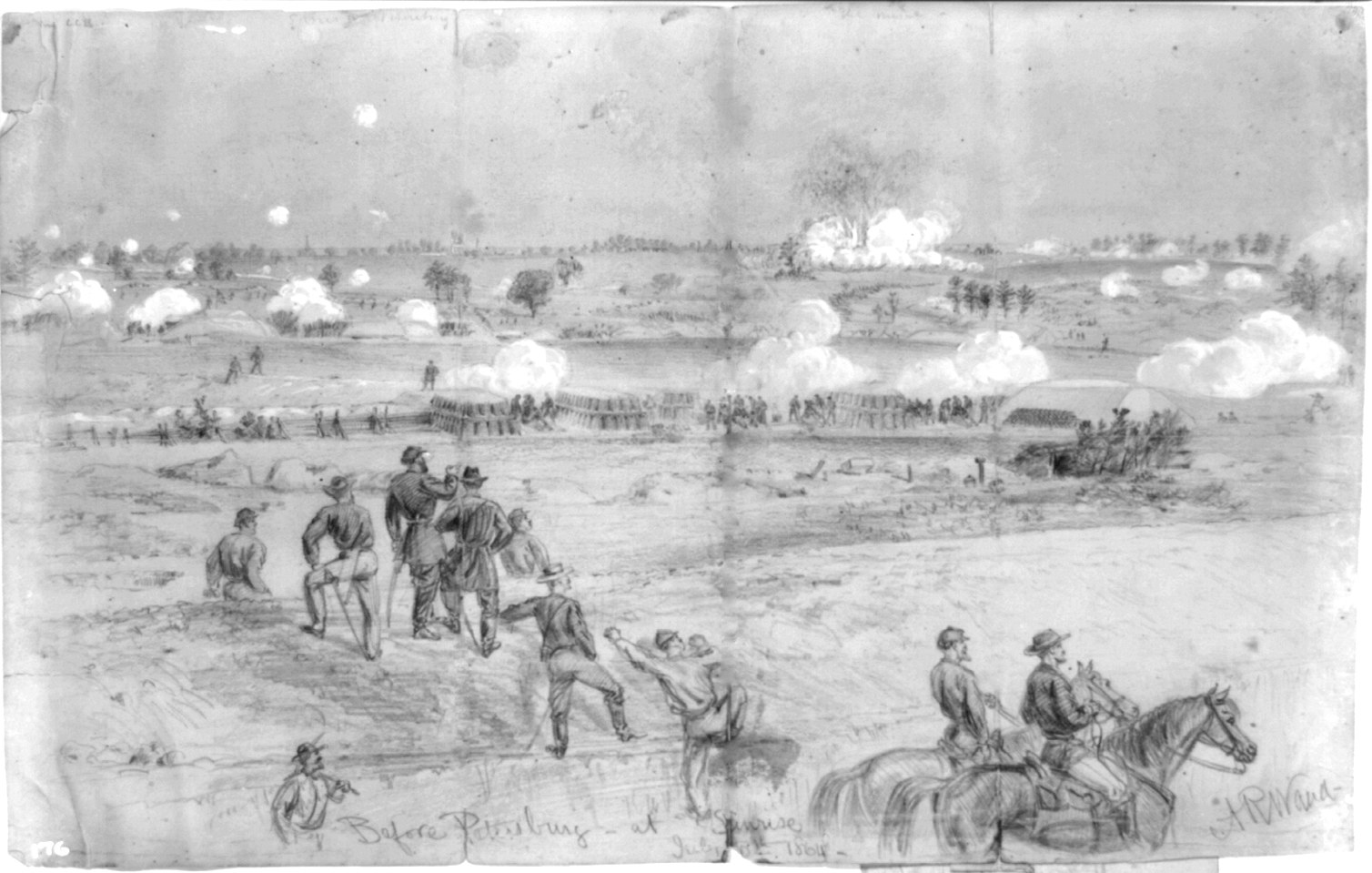
Sketch of the explosion seen from the Union line.

At 4:44 a.m. on July 30, the charges were exploded. A crater (still visible today) was created 170 feet (52 m) long by 60 to 80 feet (24 m) wide and 30 feet (9.1 m) deep. The blast destroyed the Confederate fortifications in the immediate vicinity and instantly killed between 250 and 350 Confederate soldiers. Ledlie's untrained division was not prepared for the explosion and reports indicate they waited ten minutes before leaving their own entrenchments. Instead of moving around the crater as Ferrero's troops had been trained to do, they moved down into the crater itself. Since this was not the planned movement, there were no ladders provided for the men to use in exiting the crater. Mahone assembled a counterattacking force. By about an hour later, they had formed up around the crater and began firing rifles and artillery down into it, in what Mahone later described as a "turkey shoot". The plan had failed but Burnside, instead of cutting his losses, sent in Ferrero's men. Now faced with considerable flanking fire, they also went down into the crater and for the next few hours, Mahone's soldiers, reinforced by Johnson and artillery, slaughtered the men of the IX Corps as they attempted to escape from the crater. Some Union troops eventually advanced and flanked to the right beyond the crater to the earthworks and assaulted the Confederate lines, driving the Confederates back for several hours in hand-to-hand combat. Mahone's Confederates conducted a sweep out of a sunken gully area about 200 yards (180 m) from the right side of the Union advance. This charge reclaimed the earthworks and drove the Union force back towards the east.

Confederate casualties were approximately 1,500 (200 killed, 900 wounded, 400 missing or captured). Union casualties were 3,798 (504 killed, 1,881 wounded, 1,413 missing or captured). Grant wrote that, "It was the saddest affair I have witnessed in the war." Many of the Union casualties were suffered by Ferrero's division. Burnside was relieved of command.

== Second Deep Bottom (August 14–20) ==
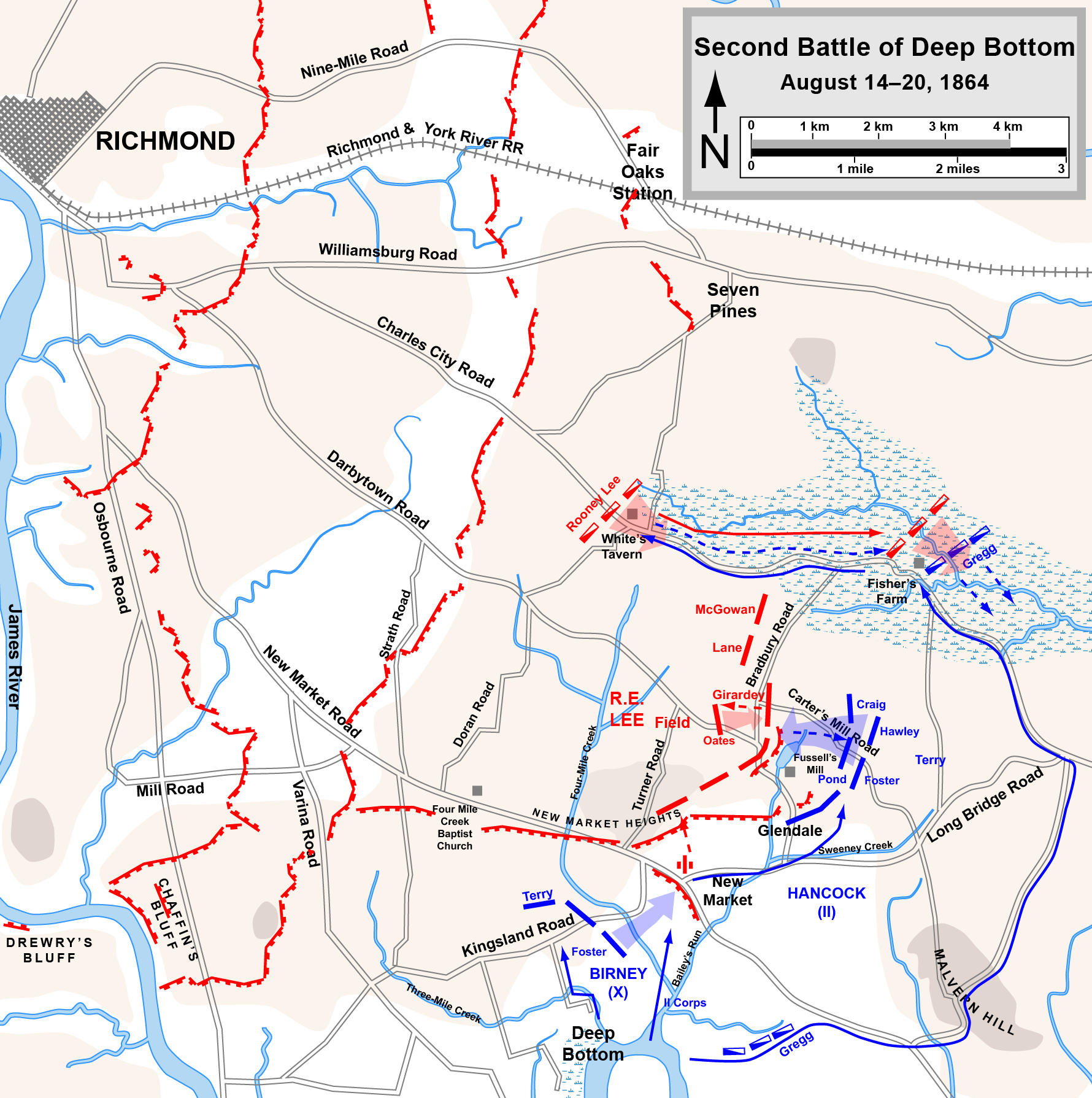
Second Battle of Deep Bottom, August 14–20

On the same day the Union failed at the Crater, Early, commanding the Confederate Second Corps, was burning the town of Chambersburg, Pennsylvania, as he operated out of the Shenandoah Valley, threatening towns in Maryland and Pennsylvania, as well as the District of Columbia. Lee was concerned about actions that Grant might take against Early and sent the Kershaw's infantry division from Anderson's corps and the cavalry division commanded by Fitzhugh Lee to Culpeper, Virginia, where they could either provide aid to Early or be recalled to the Richmond-Petersburg front as needed. Grant misinterpreted this movement and assumed that Anderson's entire corps had been removed from the vicinity of Richmond, leaving only about 8,500 men north of the James River. He determined to try again with an advance toward the Confederate capital led by Hancock. This would either prevent reinforcements from aiding Early or once again dilute the Confederate strength in the defensive lines around Petersburg.

On August 13, X Corps, commanded by Birney, and Gregg's cavalry division crossed pontoon bridges from Bermuda Hundred to Deep Bottom. II Corps crossed by steamships the night of August 13–14. Birney's troops successfully pushed aside pickets on the Kingsland Road, but were stopped by the fortifications on New Market Heights. The II Corps units moved slowly into position, suffering numerous deaths from heat stroke.

It was not until midday on August 14 that the Union made contact with the Confederates, manning rifle pits on the Darbytown Road just north of the Long Bridge Road. The Union generals were surprised at the Confederate strength. On the right, a full Confederate division commanded by Field was dug in. Chaffin's Bluff was defended by a division under Wilcox and reinforcements were arriving. Barlow's 10,000 men in two divisions of II Corps attacked Fussell's Mill. They were able to drive away two Confederate cavalry regiments at the mill, but they were repulsed by Brigadier General George T. Anderson's brigade. When Field took Anderson's brigade from his right flank, it weakened the line in front of Birney's corps, which moved forward and occupied some of the Confederate entrenchments and captured four guns.

Although the Union attacks had been generally unsuccessful, they had some of the effect Grant desired. Lee became convinced that the threat against Richmond was a serious one and he dispatched two infantry brigades of Mahone's division and the cavalry divisions of Hampton and "Rooney" Lee. Hancock ordered Birney's corps to make a night march to join Barlow's end of the line. Birney's movement was delayed by difficult terrain for most of August 15 and Hancock's plan for an attack was abandoned for the day.

On August 16, Gregg's cavalry swept to the right and rode northwest on the Charles City Road toward Richmond. They found Rooney Lee's cavalry division blocking the road and a full day of fighting resulted. Confederate Brigadier General Chambliss was killed during the fighting. The infantrymen of the X Corps had a better start to the day, as Terry's division broke through the Confederate line. Brigadier General Ambrose R. Wright's brigade was hit hard and retreated, opening a significant gap. The heavily wooded terrain prevented Birney and Hancock from understanding that they had reached a position of advantage and they were unable to exploit it before Field rearranged his lines to fill the gap and drive back the Federals.

Lee planned a counterattack against the Union right for 11 a.m. on August 18, but it was poorly coordinated and made no significant gains. On the night of August 20, Hancock withdrew his force back over the James. Union casualties were approximately 2,900 men, some due to heat stroke. Confederate casualties were 1,500.

== Operations against the Weldon Railroad ==
=== Globe Tavern (August 18–21) ===
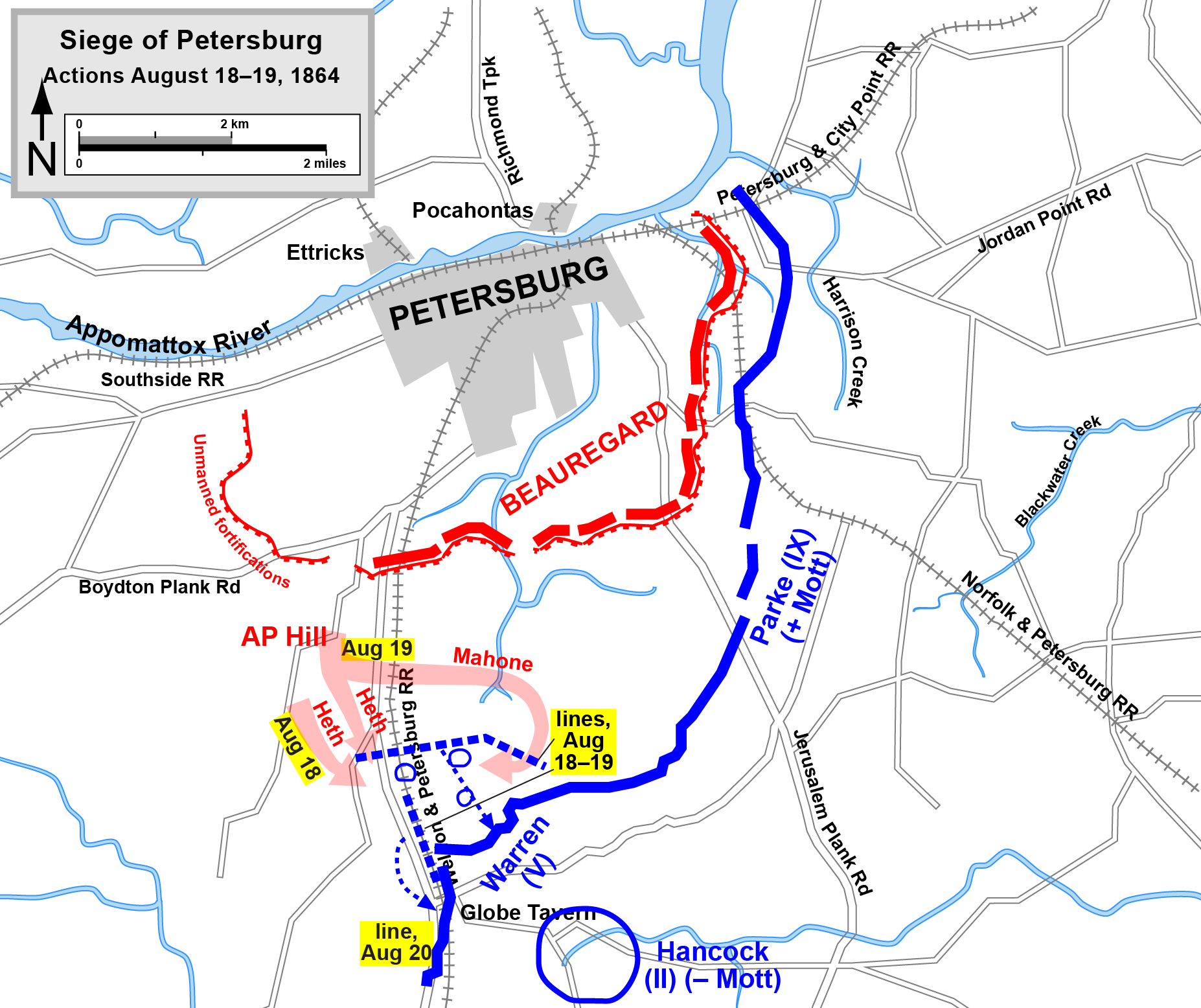
Siege of Petersburg, capture of the Weldon Railroad, August 18–19

While II Corps fought at Deep Bottom, Grant planned another attack against the Weldon. He chose Warren's V Corps to lead the operation. Grant was encouraged by a message he received August 17 from Lincoln:

I have seen your despatch expressing your unwillingness to break your hold where you are. Neither am I willing. Hold on with a bulldog grip, and chew and choke as much as possible.

Grant remarked to his staff, "The President has more nerve than any of his advisors."

At dawn on August 18, Warren advanced to the south and reached the railroad at Globe Tavern around 9 a.m. Parts of the division under Griffin began to destroy the track while a brigade from Ayres' division formed in line of battle and moved north to block any Confederate advance from that direction. Ayres encountered Confederate troops at about 1 p.m. and Warren ordered the division under Crawford to move forward on Ayres' right in an attempt to outflank the Confederate left. Hill sent three brigades to meet the advancing Union divisions. At about 2 p.m. they launched a strong attack and pushed the Union troops back to within less than a mile of Globe Tavern. Warren counterattacked and regained his lost ground. His men entrenched for the night.

Reinforcements arrived during the night—the Union IX Corps under Parke and for the Confederates, three infantry brigades from Mahone's division and "Rooney" Lee's cavalry division. In the late afternoon of August 19, Mahone launched a flanking attack that found a weak spot in Crawford's line, causing hundreds of Crawford's men to flee in panic. Heth launched a frontal assault against the center and left, which was easily repulsed by Ayres' division. The IX Corps counterattacked and fighting ended at dusk. On the night of August 20–21, Warren pulled his troops back two miles (3 km) to a new line of fortifications, which were connected with the main Union lines on the Jerusalem Plank Road. The Confederates attacked at 9 a.m. on August 21, with Mahone striking the Federal left and Heth the center. Both attacks were unsuccessful against the strong entrenchments and resulted in heavy losses. By 10:30 a.m., the Confederates withdrew.

Union casualties at Globe Tavern were 4,296 (251 killed, 1,148 wounded, 2,897 missing/captured). Confederate casualties were 1,620 (211 killed, 990 wounded, 419 missing/captured). The Confederates had lost a key section of the Weldon Railroad and were forced to carry supplies by wagon 30 miles (48 km) from the railroad at Stony Creek up the Boydton Plank Road into Petersburg. This was not yet a critical problem for the Confederates. A member of Lee's staff wrote, "Whilst we are inconvenienced, no material harm is done us." Grant was not entirely satisfied with Warren's victory, which he rightly characterized as wholly defensive in nature.

Globe Tavern was the first Union victory of the campaign.

=== Second Reams Station (August 25) ===
Grant wanted the Weldon line closed permanently by destroying 14 miles (23 km) of track from Warren's position near Globe Tavern as far south as Rowanty Creek (about 3 miles (4.8 km) north of the town of Stony Creek). He assigned the operation to Hancock's II Corps, which was in the process of moving south from their operation at Deep Bottom. While Hancock's corps was exhausted from their efforts north of the James and their forced march south, Warren's troops were tasked with extending the fortifications at Globe Tavern. Grant augmented Hancock's corps with Gregg's cavalry division. Gregg's division departed on August 22. After driving off Confederate pickets, they and the II Corps infantry division commanded by Brigadier General Nelson A. Miles (Note: Temporarily commanding Barlow's division.) destroyed the railroad tracks to within 2 miles (3.2 km) of Reams Station. Early on August 23, Hancock's other division, commanded by Gibbon, occupied Reams Station, taking up positions in earthworks that had been constructed by the Union cavalry during the Wilson–Kautz Raid in June.

Lee considered that the Union troops at Reams Station represented not only a threat to his supply line, but also to the county seat of Dinwiddie County. If Dinwiddie Court House were to fall, the Confederates would be forced to evacuate both Petersburg and Richmond because it represented a key point on the army's potential withdrawal route. He also saw an opportunity—that he could impose a strategic defeat upon the Union Army shortly before the presidential election in November. Lee ordered Hill to take the overall command of a combined cavalry and infantry force of 8,000–10,000 men.

Wilcox's division assaulted the Union position at about 2 p.m. on August 25. Despite launching two attacks, Wilcox was driven back by Miles's division, which was manning the northern part of the earthworks. To the south, Gibbon's division was blocking the advance of Hampton's cavalry, which had swept around the Union line. Confederate reinforcements from Heth's and Mahone's divisions arrived while the Confederate artillery bombarded the Union position. The final attack began around 5:30 p.m. against Miles's position and it broke through the northwest corner of the Union fortifications. Hancock galloped from one threatened point to the next, attempting to rally his men. As he witnessed the men of his corps reluctant to retake their positions from the enemy, he remarked to a colonel, "I do not care to die, but I pray God I may never leave this field." By this time, Hampton's cavalry was making progress against Gibbon's infantry to the south, launching a surprise dismounted attack that caused many of Gibbon's men to flee or surrender. This allowed Hampton to flank Miles. Hancock ordered a counterattack, which provided time to allow for an orderly Union withdrawal to Petersburg after dark.

The Union suffered approximately 2,700 casualties and the Confederate approximately 800. Although the Confederates had won a clear victory, they had lost a vital piece of the Weldon Railroad. From this point on they were only able to transport supplies by rail on this line as far north as the Stony Creek Depot, 16 miles (26 km) south of Petersburg. From there, supplies then had to be unloaded and tranported by wagon to Petersburg. The South Side Railroad was the only railroad left to directly supply Petersburg and Lee's army.

== Beefsteak Raid (September 14–17) ==
On September 5, a Confederate scout gave a report to Hampton on his reconnaissance behind the Union lines. At a supply depot at Coggins Point on the James River, he found approximately 3,000 beef cattle, attended by 120 men and 30 citizens, without arms. Just two days earlier, Lee had suggested to Hampton that Grant's rear area was "open to attack." On September 14 Hampton led about 4,000 men in four brigades southwest from Petersburg along the Boydton Plank Road and followed course through Dinwiddie Court House, Stony Creek Station. By the morning of September 15 the force had crossed Blackwater Swamp at Cook's Bridge. In the early morning of September 16, Hampton launched a surprise attack which met only minimal resistance. Hampton's men drove the captured herd of 2,486 cattle south toward Cook's Bridge. An attempted intervention by 2,100 Union cavalrymen under Brigadier General Henry Davies was unsuccessful. Hampton was able to retrace his steps back to Petersburg and turned the cattle over to the Confederate commissary department. For days, the Confederate troops feasted on beef and taunted their Union counterparts across the lines. A visitor to Grant's headquarters asked the general, "When do you expect to starve out Lee and capture Richmond?" Grant replied, "Never, if our armies continue to supply him with beef cattle."

== Engagements north of James River ==
=== New Market Heights (September 29–30) ===
During the night of September 28–29, Butler's Army of the James crossed the James River to assault the Richmond defenses north of the river. The columns attacked at dawn. After initial Union successes at New Market Heights and Fort Harrison, the Confederates rallied and contained the breakthrough. Lee reinforced his lines north of the James and, on September 30, he counterattacked unsuccessfully. The Federals entrenched, and the Confederates erected a new line of works cutting off the captured forts. As Grant anticipated, Lee shifted troops to meet the threat against Richmond, weakening his lines at Petersburg.

=== Peebles Farm (September 30 – October 2) ===
In combination with Butler's offensive north of the James River, Grant extended his left flank to cut Confederate lines of communication southwest of Petersburg. Two divisions of the IX corps under Maj. Gen. John G. Parke, two divisions of the V Corps under Warren, and Gregg's cavalry division were assigned to the operation. On September 30, the Federals marched via Poplar Spring Church to reach Squirrel Level and Vaughan Roads. The initial Federal attack overran Fort Archer, flanking the Confederates out of their Squirrel Level Road line. Late afternoon, Confederate reinforcements arrived, slowing the Federal advance. On October 1, the Federals repulsed a Confederate counterattack directed by A.P. Hill. Reinforced by Maj. Gen. Gershom Mott's division, the Federals resumed their advance on October 2, captured Fort MacRae (which was lightly defended) and extended their left flank to the vicinity of Peebles' and Pegram's Farms. With these limited successes, Meade suspended the offensive. A new line was entrenched from the Federal works on Weldon Railroad to Pegram's Farm.

=== Darbytown and New Market roads (October 7) ===
Responding to the loss of Fort Harrison and the increasing Federal threat against Richmond, Gen. Robert E. Lee directed an offensive against the Union far right flank on October 7. After routing the Federal cavalry from their position covering Darbytown Road, Field's and Hoke's divisions assaulted the main Union defensive line along New Market Road and were repulsed. The Federals were not dislodged, and Lee withdrew into the Richmond defenses.

=== Darbytown Road (October 13) ===
On October 13, Union forces advanced to find and feel the new Confederate defensive line in front of Richmond. While mostly a battle of skirmishers, a Federal brigade assaulted fortifications north of Darbytown Road and was repulsed with heavy casualties. The Federals retired to their entrenched lines along New Market Road.

=== Fair Oaks and Darbytown Road (October 27–28) ===
In combination with movements against the Boydton Plank Road at Petersburg, Benjamin Butler attacked the Richmond defenses along Darbytown Road with the X Corps. The XVIII Corps marched north to Fair Oaks where it was repulsed by Field's Confederate division. Confederate forces counterattacked, taking some 600 prisoners. The Richmond defenses remained intact.

== Boydton Plank Road (October 27–28) ==
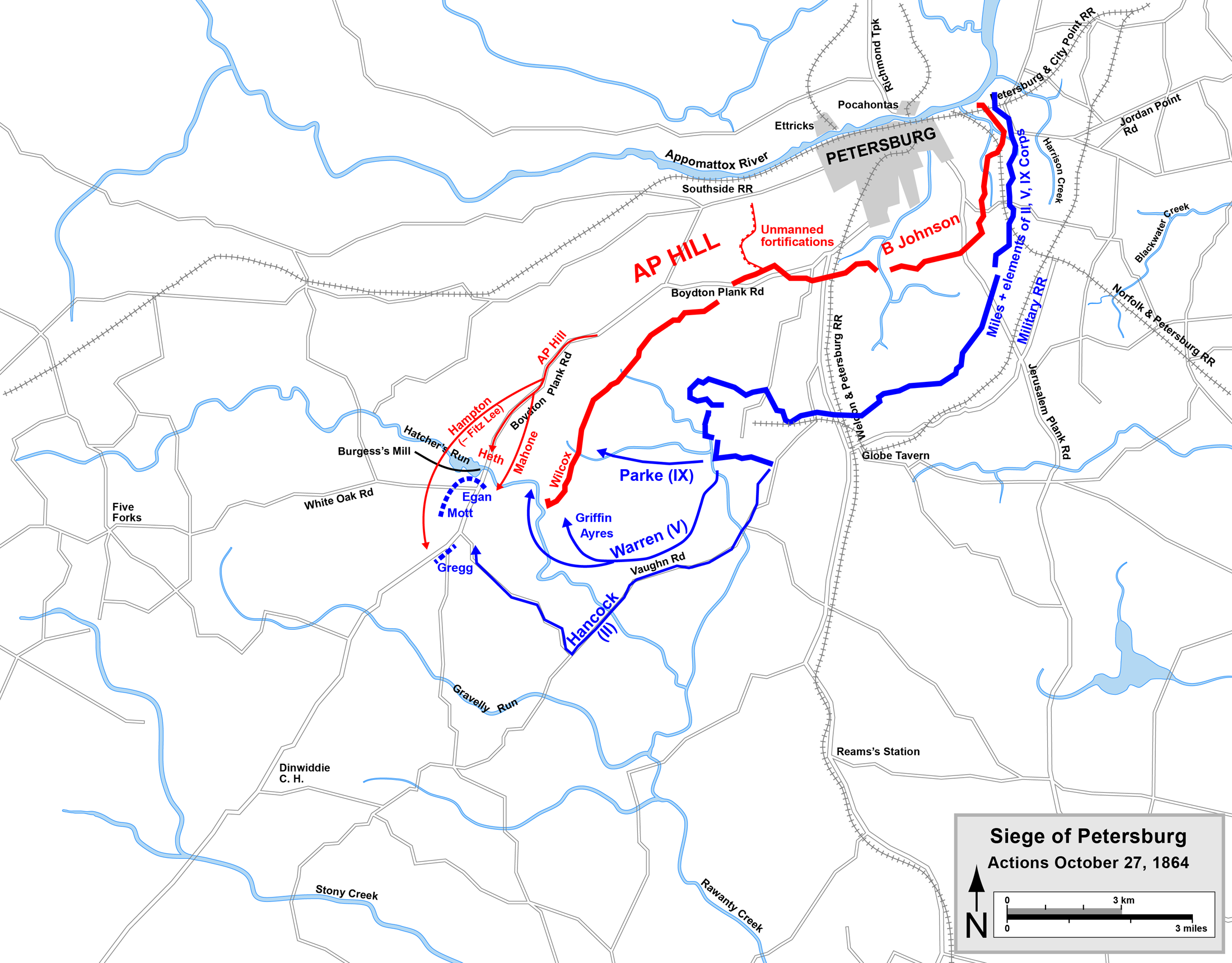
Siege of Petersburg, actions on October 27

Directed by Hancock, divisions from three Union corps (II, V, and IX) and Gregg's cavalry division, numbering more than 30,000 men, withdrew from the Petersburg lines and marched west to operate against the Boydton Plank Road and South Side Railroad. The initial Union advance on October 27 gained the Boydton Plank Road, a major campaign objective. But that afternoon, a counterattack near Burgess' Mill spearheaded by Heth's division, and Hampton's cavalry isolated the II Corps and forced a retreat. The Confederates retained control of the Boydton Plank Road for the rest of the winter. It marked the last battle for Hancock, who resigned from field command because of wounds sustained at Gettysburg.

== Hatcher's Run (February 5–7, 1865) ==
On February 5, 1865, Gregg's cavalry division rode out to the Boydton Plank Road via Ream's Station and Dinwiddie Court House in an attempt to intercept Confederate supply trains. Warren's V Corps crossed Hatcher's Run and took up a blocking position on the Vaughan Road to prevent interference with Gregg's operations. Two divisions of the II Corps under Maj. Gen. Andrew A. Humphreys shifted west to near Armstrong's Mill to cover Warren's right flank. Late in the day, John B. Gordon attempted to turn Humphrey's right flank near the mill but was repulsed. During the night, the Federals were reinforced by two divisions. On February 6, Gregg returned to Gravelly Run on Vaughan Road from his unsuccessful raid and was attacked by elements of Brig. Gen. John Pegram's Confederate division. Warren pushed forward a reconnaissance in the vicinity of Dabney's Mill and was attacked by Pegram's and Mahone's divisions. Pegram was killed in the action. Although the Union advance was stopped, the Federals extended their siegeworks to the Vaughan Road crossing of Hatcher's Run.

== Confederate breakout attempt at Fort Stedman (March 25) ==
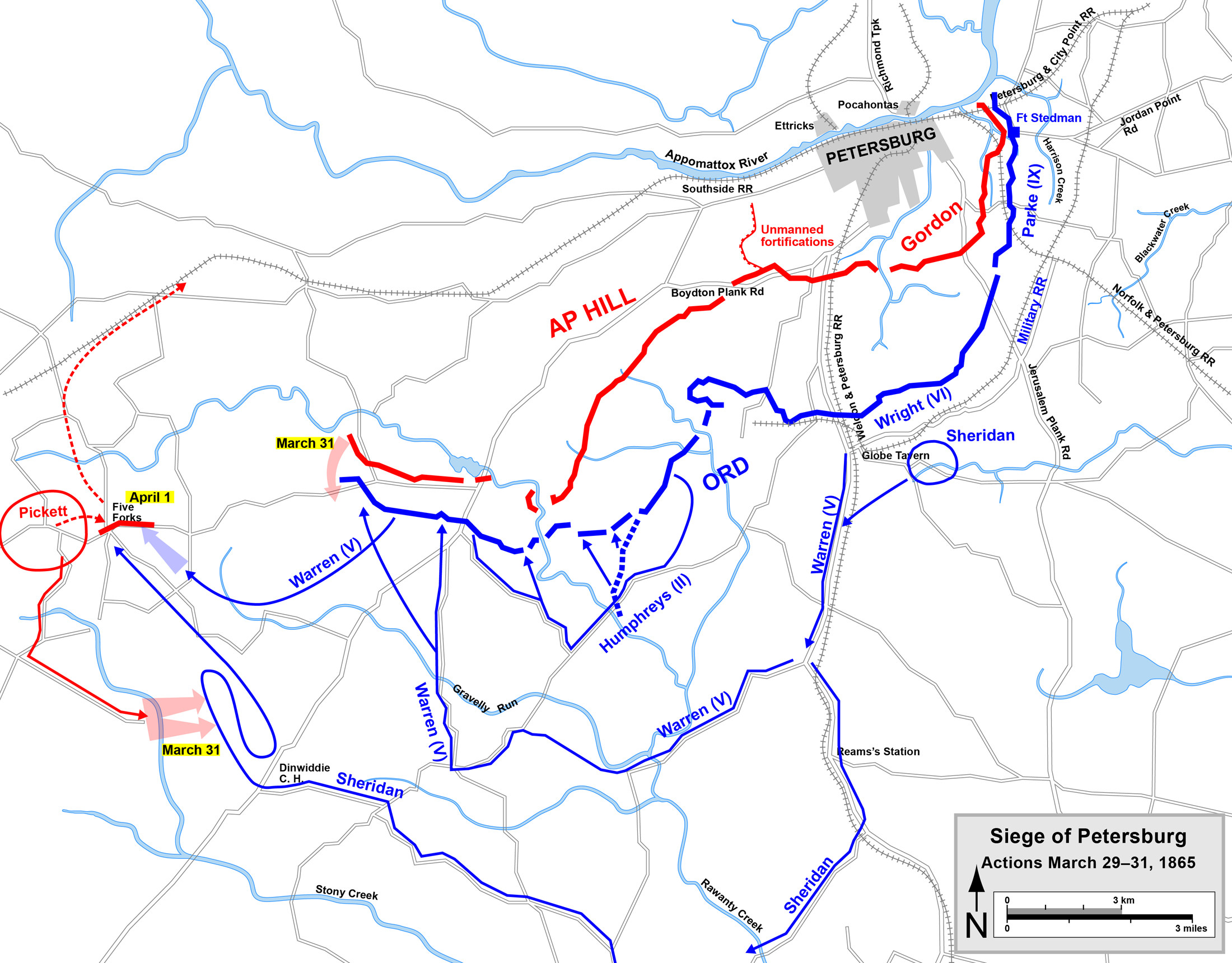
Siege of Petersburg, actions preceding Five Forks

By March, Lee's army was weakened by desertion, disease, and shortage of supplies and he was outnumbered by Grant by about 125,000 to 50,000. Lee knew that an additional 50,000 men under Sheridan would be returning soon from the Shenandoah Valley and Sherman was marching north through the Carolinas to join Grant as well. Lee had Maj. Gen. John B. Gordon plan a surprise attack on the Union lines that would force Grant to contract his lines and disrupt his plans to assault the Confederate works (which, unbeknownst to Lee and Gordon, Grant had already ordered for March 29). The attack would be launched with almost half of Lee's infantry from Colquitt's Salient against Fort Stedman, and Gordon had hopes that he could drive into the Union rear area as far as City Point.

Gordon's attack started at 4:15 a.m. Lead parties of sharpshooters and engineers masquerading as deserting soldiers headed out to overwhelm Union pickets and to remove obstructions that would delay the infantry advance. They were followed by three groups of 100 men assigned to storm the Union works and stream back into the Union rear area. Realizing there was a breach in his lines, US Brig. Gen. Napoleon B. McLaughlen rode to Fort Haskell, just to the south of Battery XII, which he found to be ready to defend itself. As he moved north, he ordered Battery XII to open fire on Battery XI and a reserve infantry regiment briefly re-captured Battery XI. Assuming that he had sealed the only breach in the line, McLaughlen rode into Fort Stedman and began giving orders to the men. He suddenly realized that they were Confederates and they realized he was a Union general, capturing him.

Gordon soon arrived at Fort Stedman and found his attack had so far exceeded his "most sanguine expectations." Within minutes, Batteries X, XI, and XII and Fort Stedman had been seized, opening a gap nearly 1,000 feet (300 m) long in the Union line. Gordon turned his attention to the southern flank of his attack and Fort Haskell. The Confederate artillery from Colquitt's Salient began bombarding Fort Haskell and the Federal field artillery returned fire, along with the massive siege guns in the rear.

Gordon's attack began to flounder. His three 100-man detachments were wandering around the rear area in confusion and many had stopped to satisfy their hunger with captured Federal rations, as the main Union defense force began to mobilize. Maj. Gen. John G. Parke of the IX Corps acted decisively, ordering the reserve division under Brig. Gen. John F. Hartranft to close the gap. Hartranft organized defensive forces that completely ringed the Confederate penetration by 7:30 a.m., stopping it just short of the military railroad depot. The Union artillery, aware that Confederates occupied the batteries and Fort Stedman, launched punishing fire against them. By 7:45 a.m., 4,000 Union troops under Hartranft were positioned in a semicircle of a mile and a half, and counterattacked, causing heavy casualties to the now-retreating Confederates.

The attack on Fort Stedman had no effect on the Union lines. The Confederate Army was forced to set back its own lines, as the Union attacked further down the front line. To give Gordon's attack enough strength to be successful, Lee had weakened his own right flank. The II and VI Corps seized much of the entrenched Confederate picket line southwest of Petersburg, but found the main line still well manned. This Union advance prepared the ground for Grant's breakthrough attack in the Third Battle of Petersburg on April 2, 1865.

Union casualties in the Battle of Fort Stedman were 1,044 (72 killed, 450 wounded, 522 missing or captured), Confederate casualties a considerably heavier 4,000 (600 killed, 2,400 wounded, 1,000 missing or captured). But more seriously, the Confederate positions were weakened. After the battle, Lee's defeat was only a matter of time. His final opportunity to break the Union lines and regain the momentum was gone.

== Final actions ==
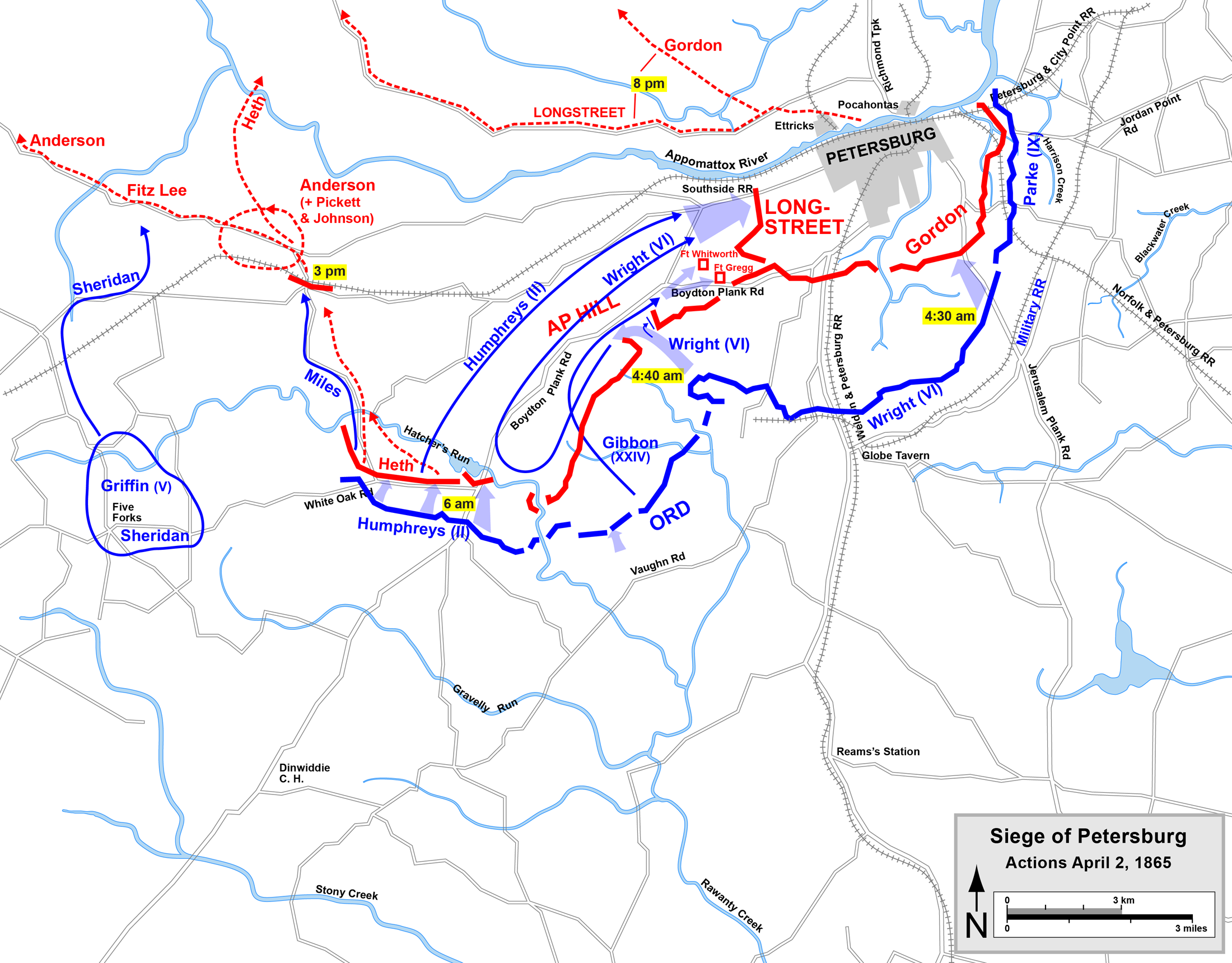
Grant's final assaults and Lee's retreat (start of the Appomattox Campaign)

After nearly ten months of siege, the loss at Fort Stedman was a devastating blow for Lee's army, setting up the Confederate defeat at Five Forks on April 1, the Union breakthrough at Petersburg on April 2, the surrender of the city of Petersburg at dawn on April 3, and Richmond that same evening.

After his victory at Five Forks, Grant ordered an assault along the entire Confederate line beginning at dawn on April 2. Parke's IX Corps overran the eastern trenches but were met with stiff resistance. At 5:30 a.m. on April 2, Wright's VI Corps made a decisive breakthrough along the Boydton Plank Road line. While riding between the lines to rally his men, A. P. Hill was shot and killed by two Union soldiers. Wright's initial breakthrough was halted mid-day at Fort Gregg. Gibbon's XXIV Corps overran Fort Gregg after a strong Confederate defense. This halt in the advance into the city of Petersburg allowed Lee to pull his forces out of Petersburg and Richmond on the night of April 2, and head for the west in an attempt to meet up with forces under the command of Johnston in North Carolina. The resulting Appomattox Campaign ended with Lee's surrender to Grant on April 9 at Appomattox Court House.

Richmond–Petersburg was a costly campaign for both sides. The initial assaults on Petersburg in June 1864 cost the Union 11,386 casualties, to approximately 4,000 for the Confederate defenders. The casualties for the siege warfare that concluded with the assault on Fort Stedman are estimated to be 42,000 for the Union and 28,000 for the Confederates. However, these proved to be losses which Grant could afford and Lee could not.

== Additional images ==
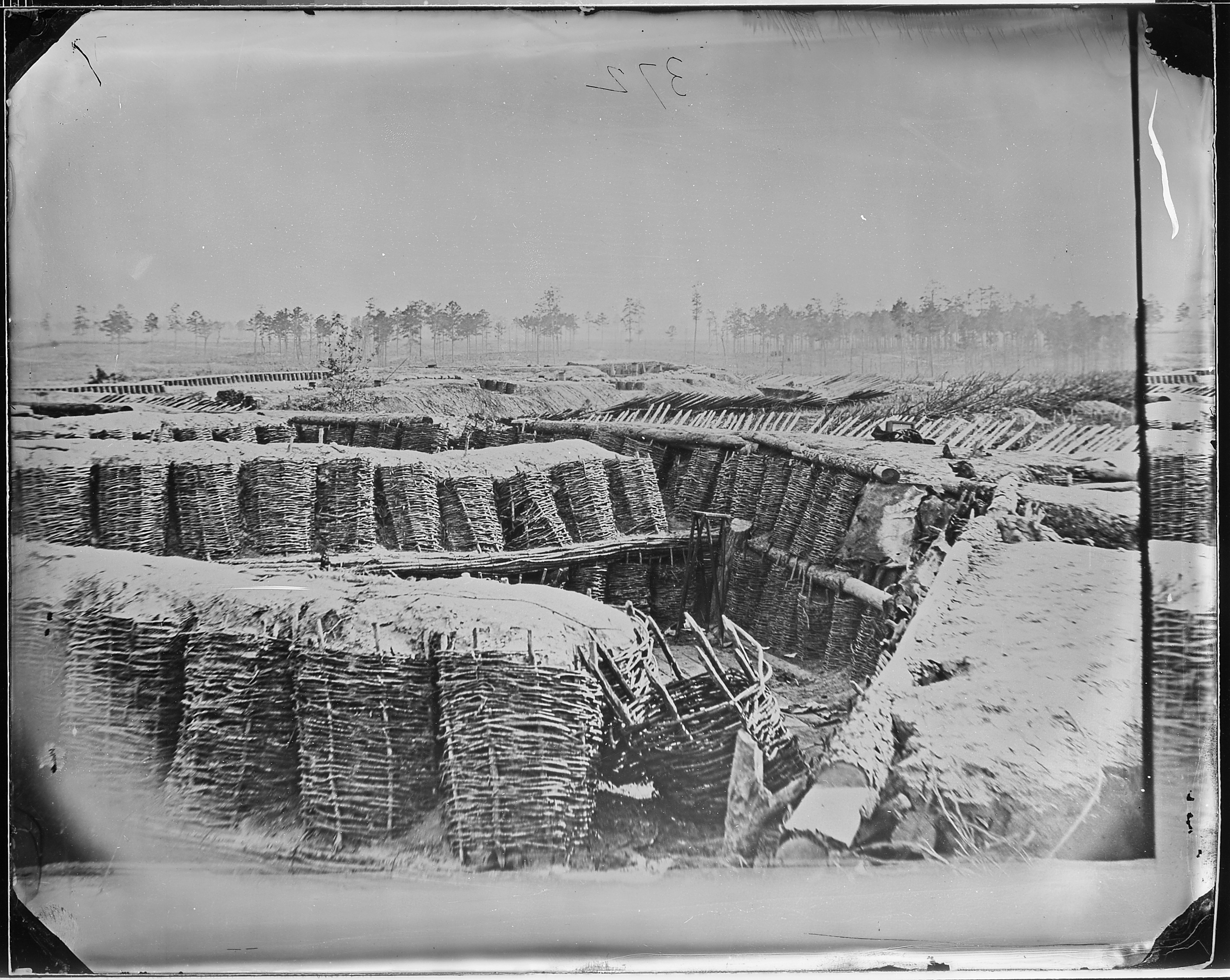
Fascine Trench Breastworks, Petersburg, Va. – NARA – 524792. Although identified as Confederate Trenches this is actually Union Fort Sedgwick aka "Fort Hell" which was opposite Fort Mahone aka "Fort Damnation"

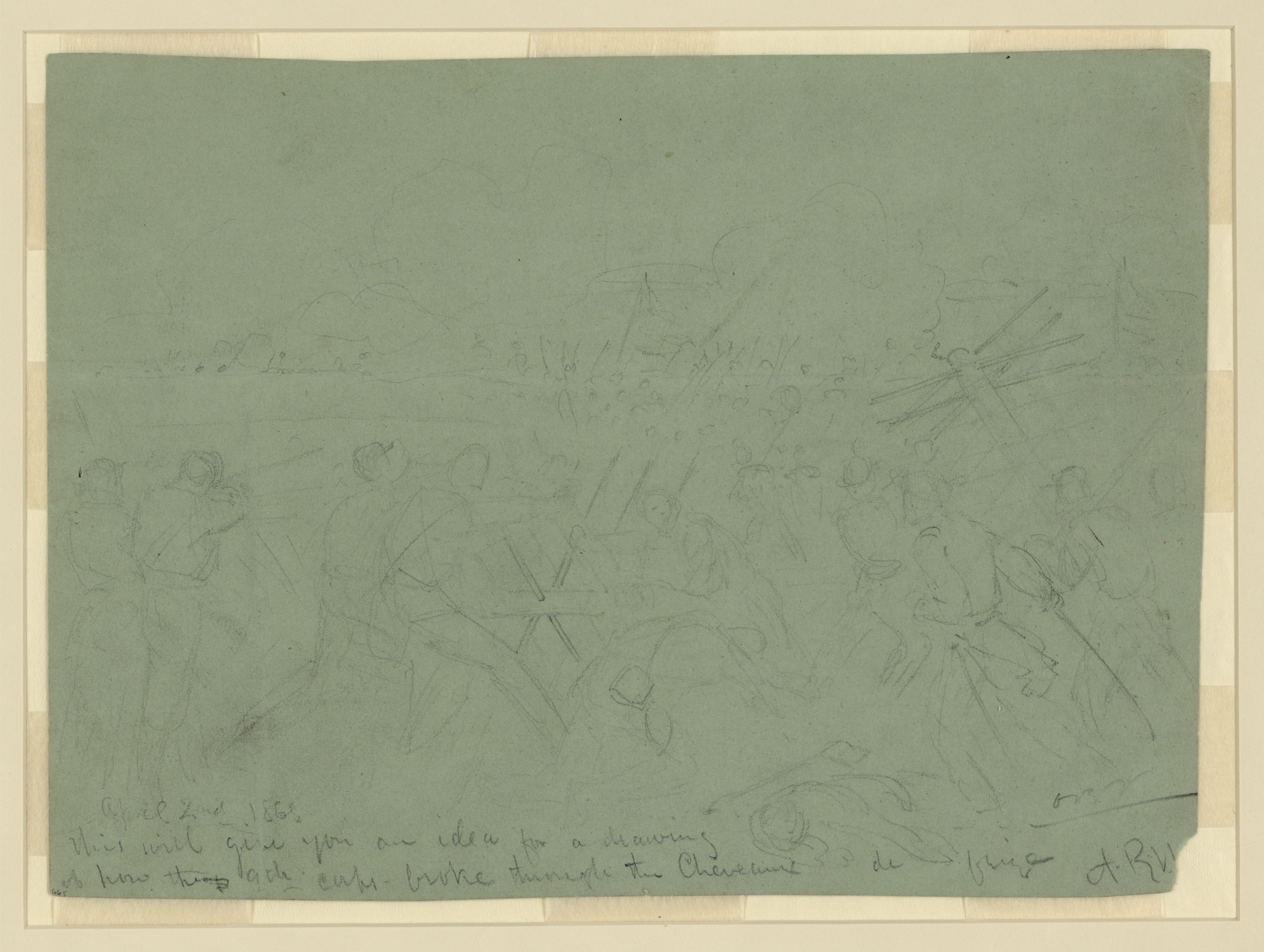
9th Corps troops dismantling rebel chevaux de frise during the attack on rebels at Fort Mahone sketch by Alfred Waud

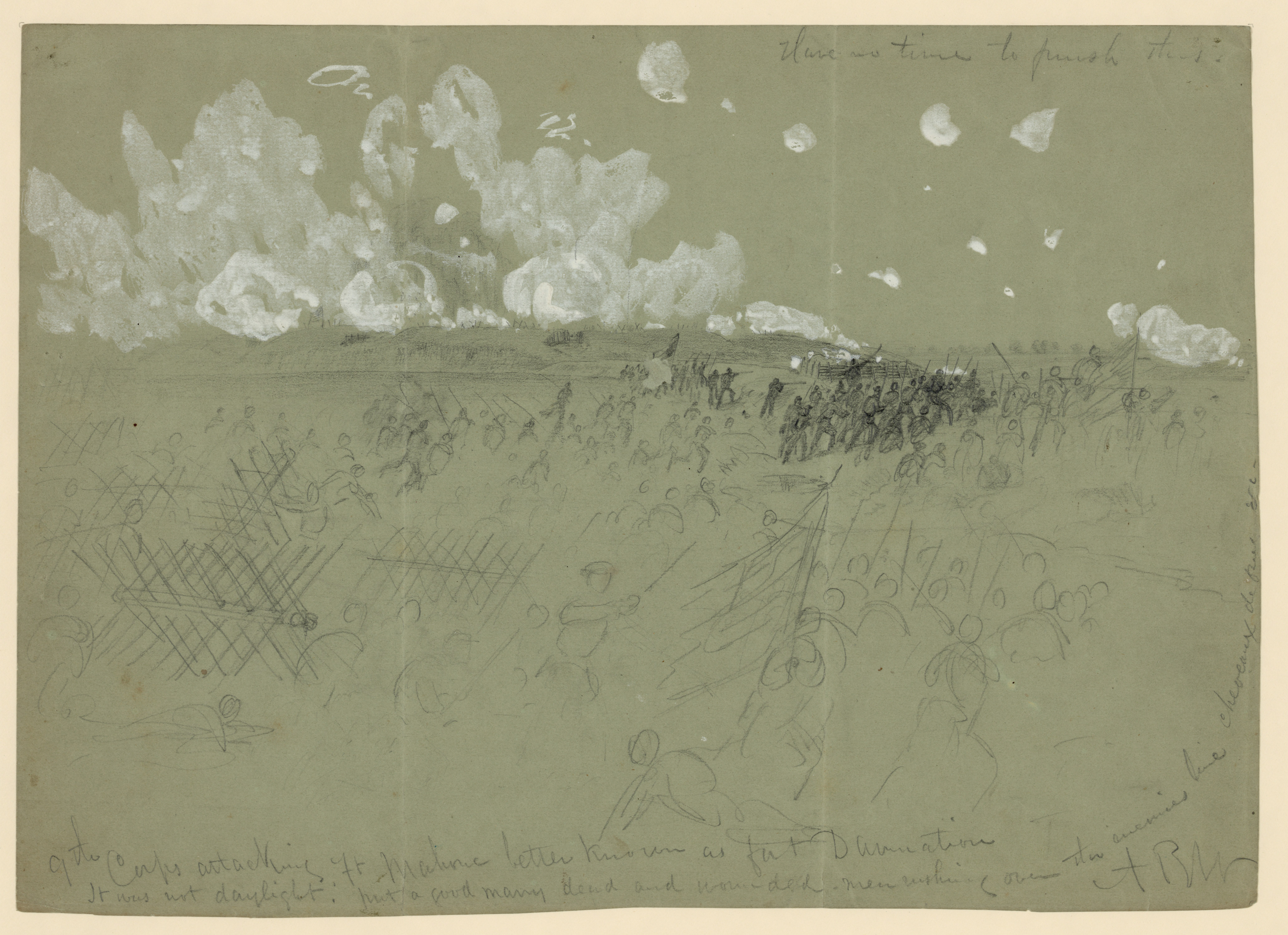
Union Army 9th Corps attacking Fort Mahone aka "Fort Damanation" sketch by Alfred Waud

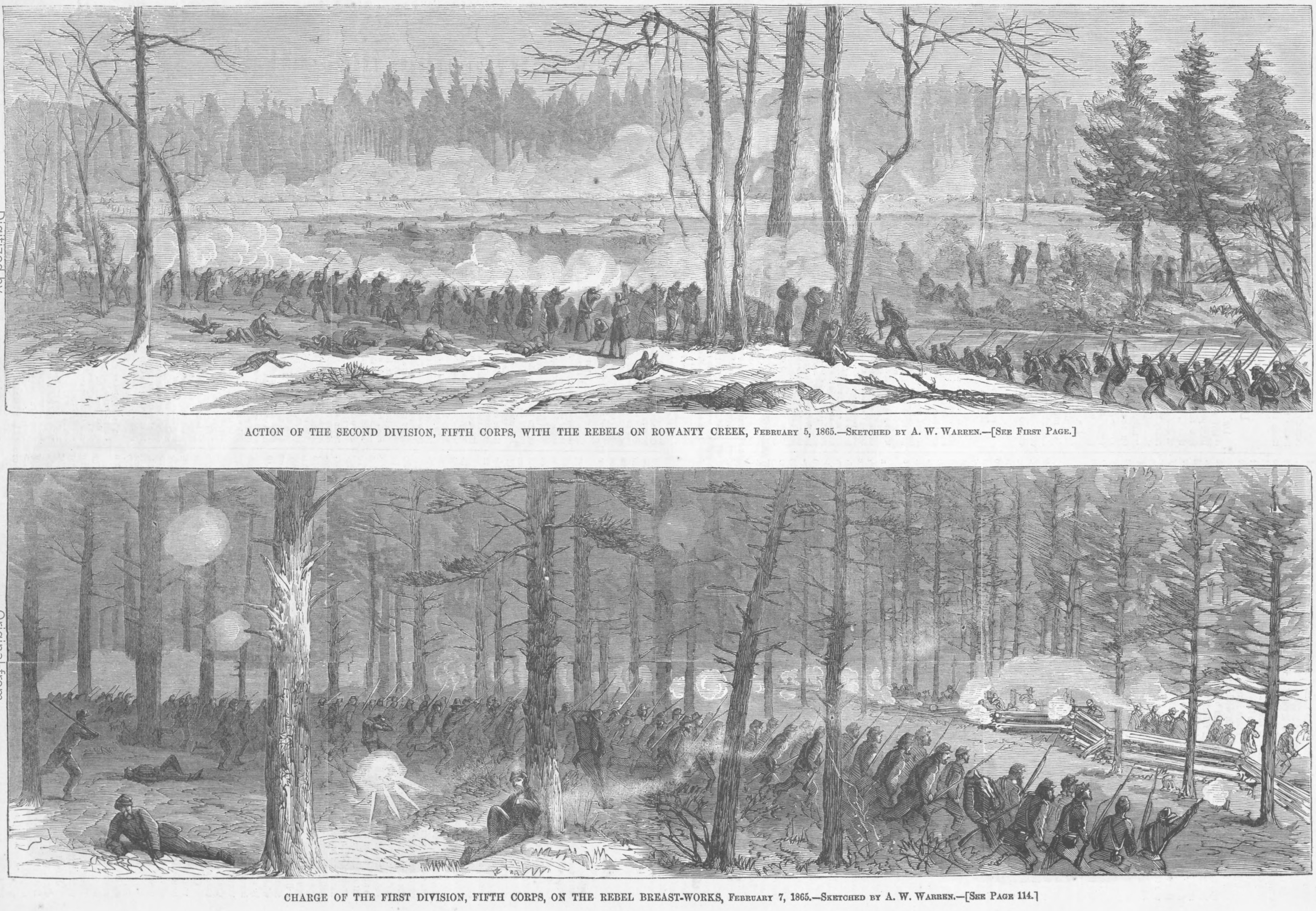
Union 5th Corps attacking Confederates at Hatcher's Run

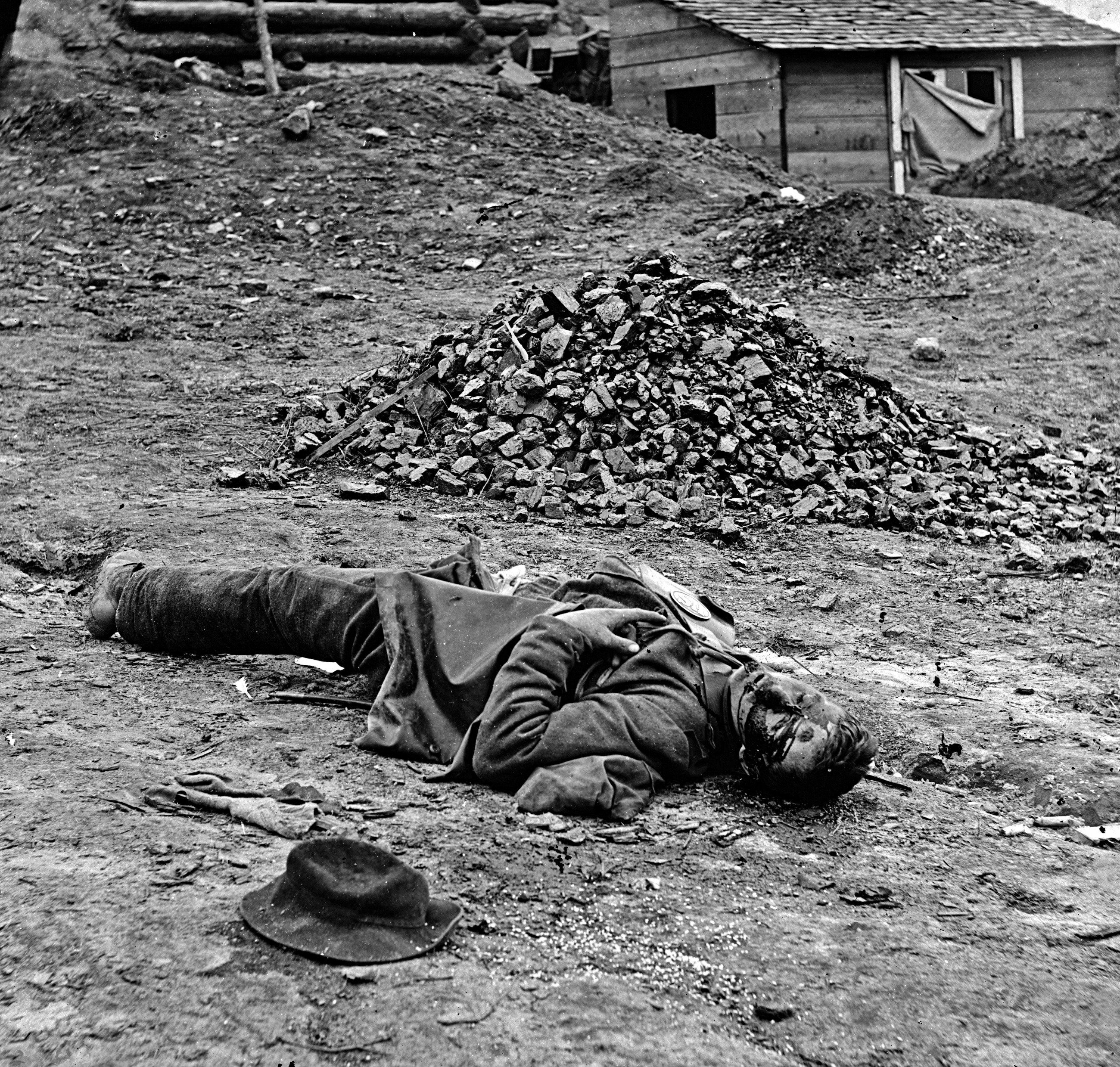
Confederate artilleryman killed during the final Union assault against the trenches at Petersburg. Photo by Thomas C. Roche, April 3, 1865. Although prints of this picture list it as being taken at Ft Mahone, historians at the "Petersburg Project" believe it was taken at Confederate Battery 25.

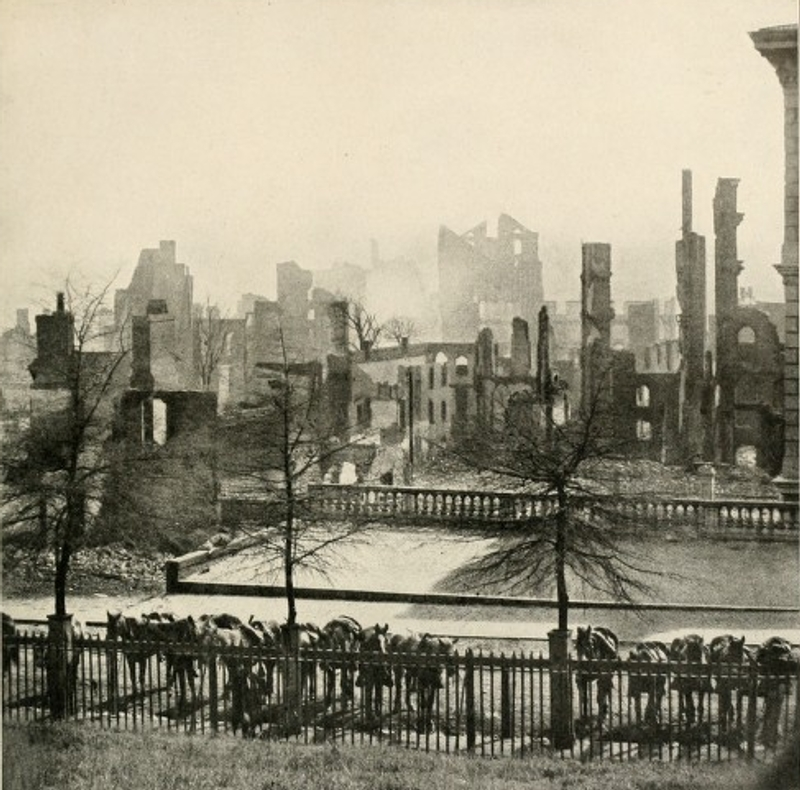
Smoke is still rising from the ruins of Richmond, Virginia after surrendering on April 3, 1865, following the Union victory at the siege of Petersburg. Union cavalry mounts with carbines visible are hitched in the foreground.

Fortifications and bomb proofs

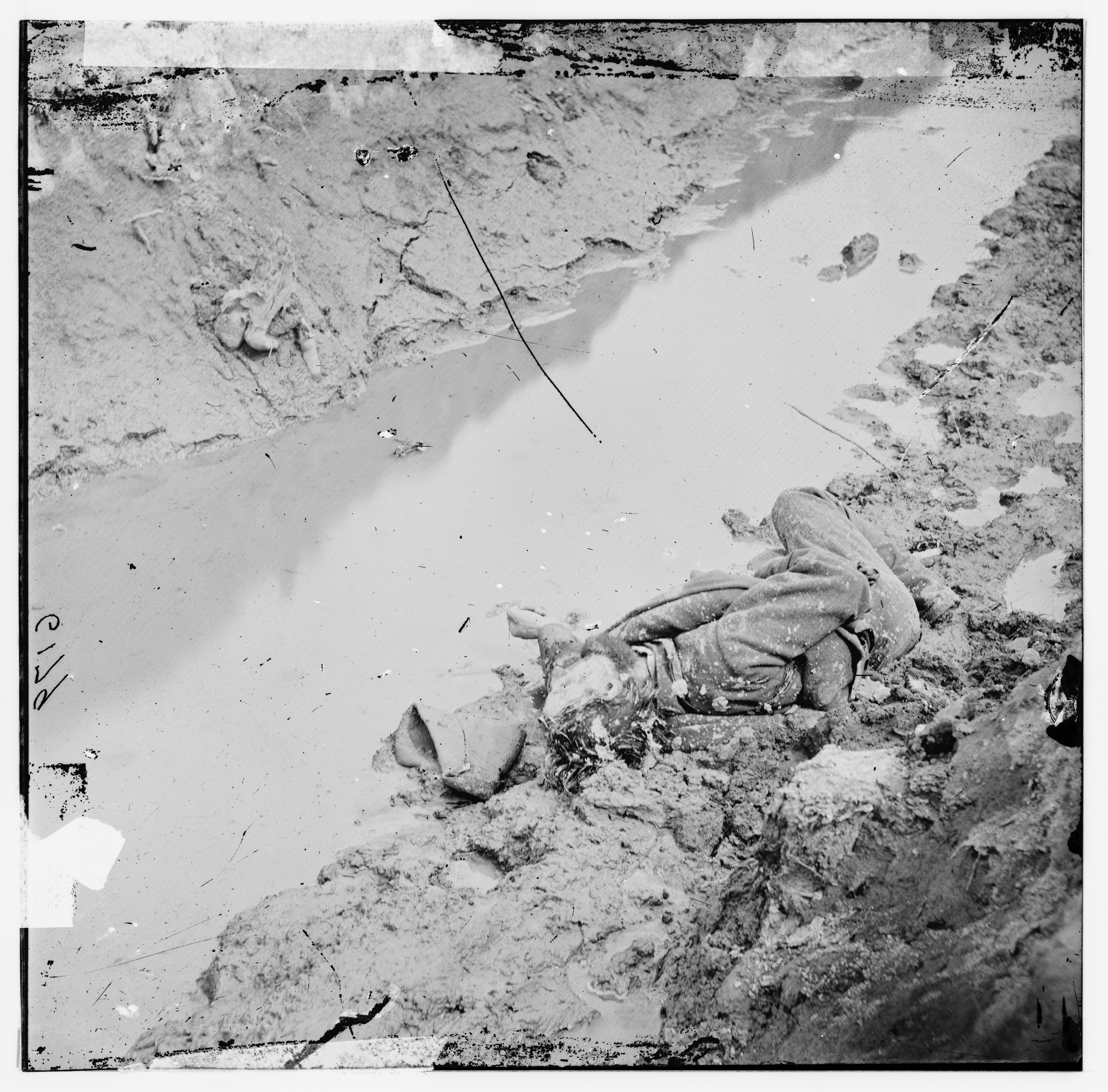

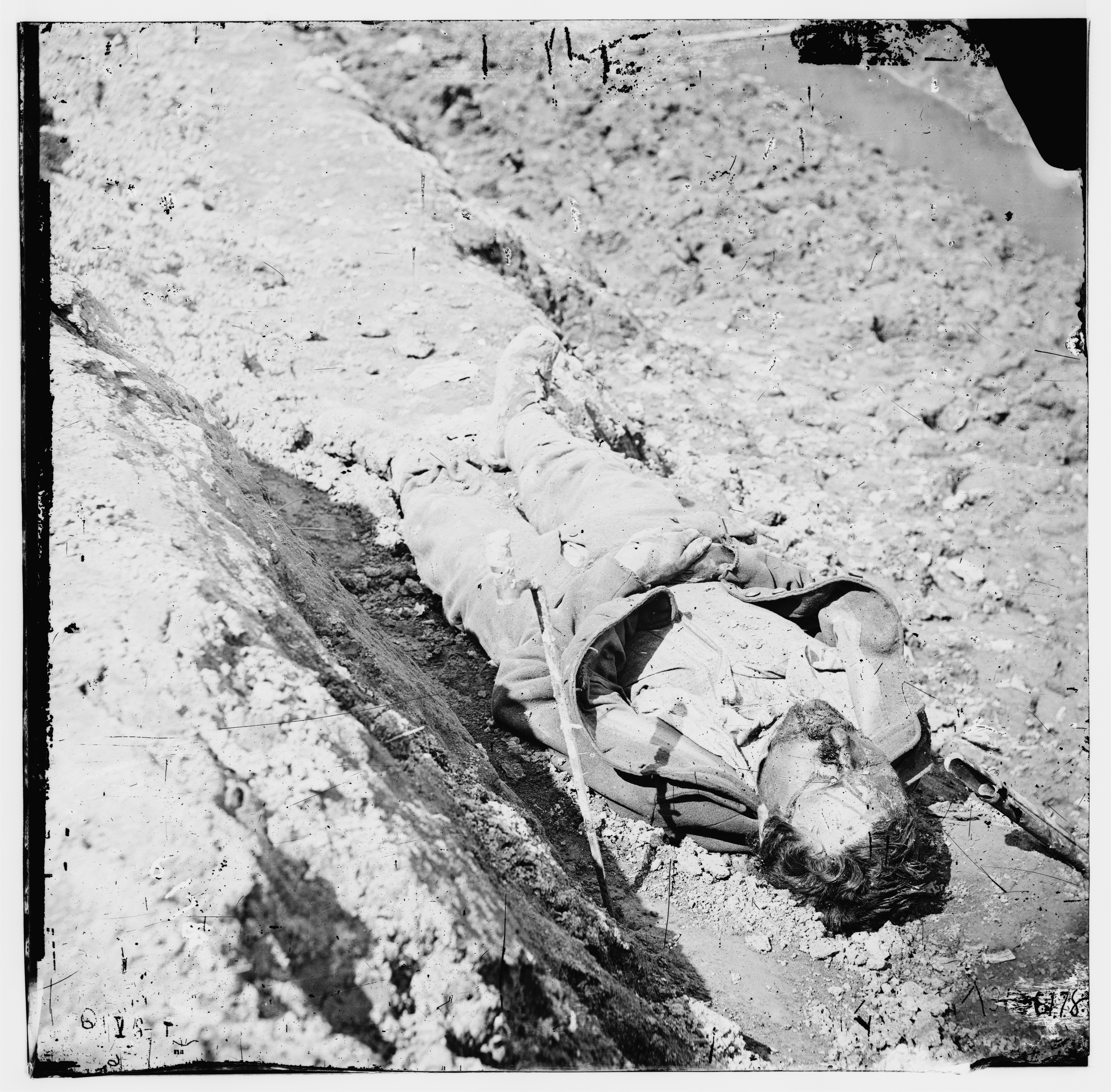

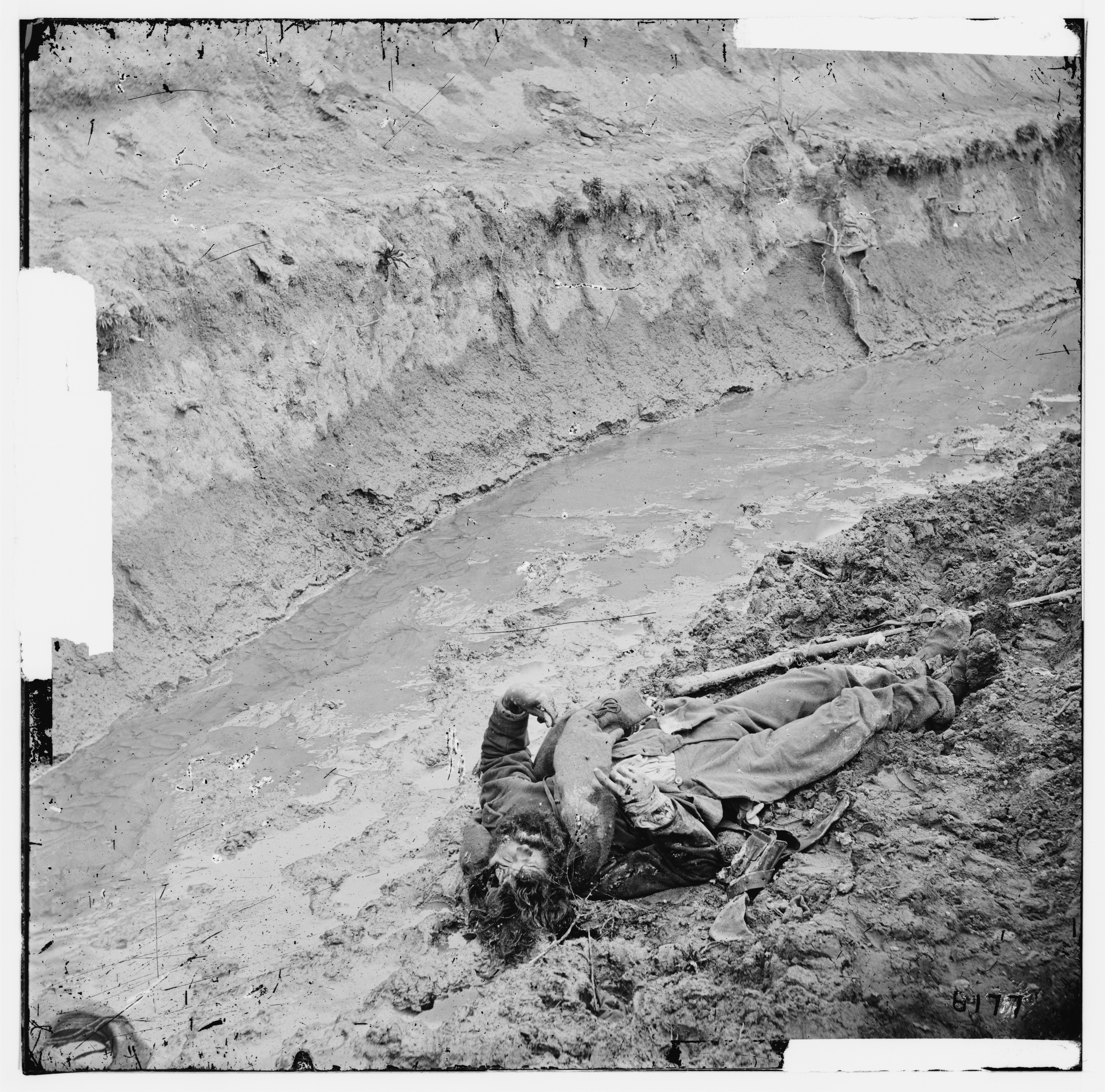

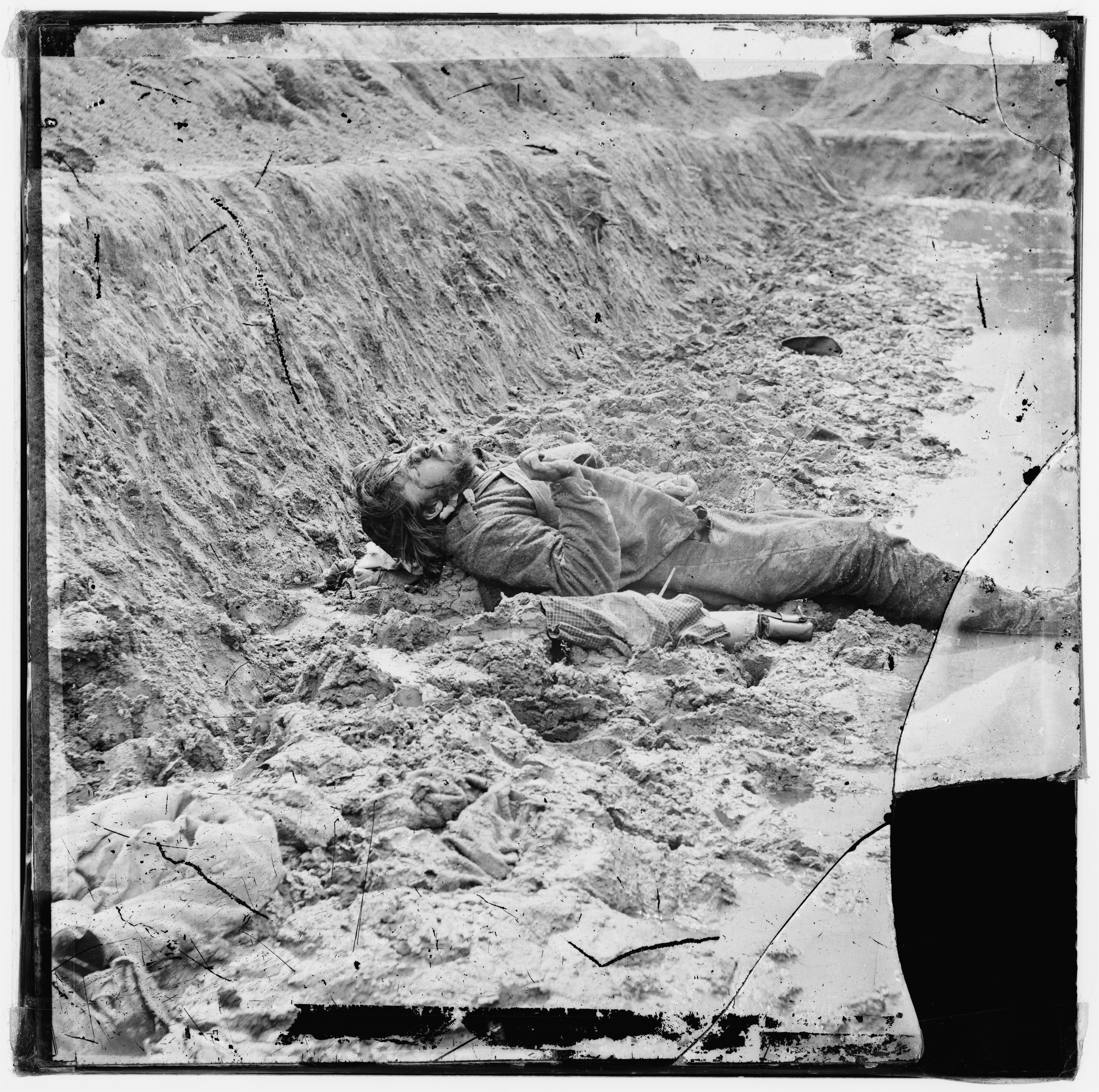

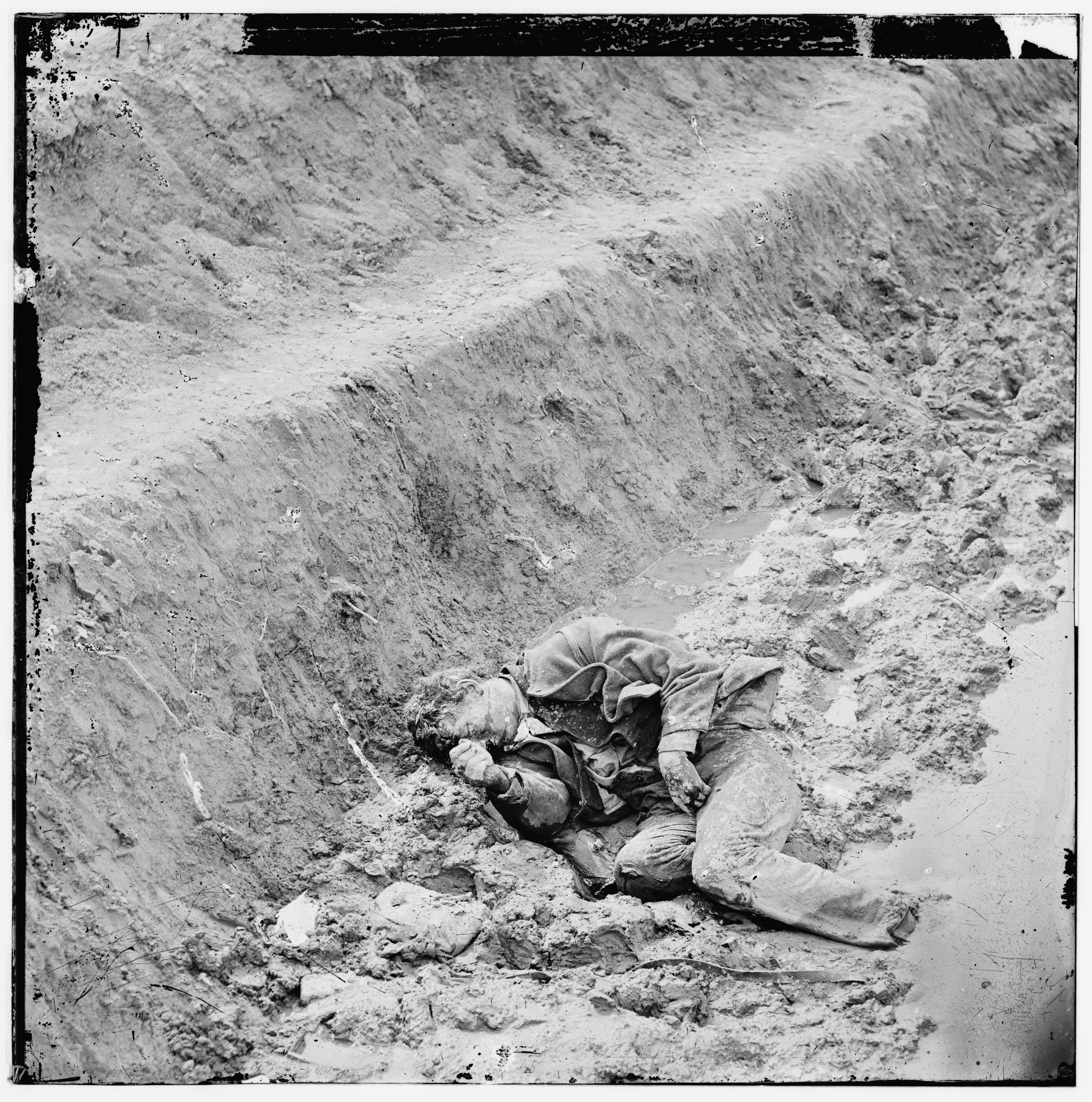

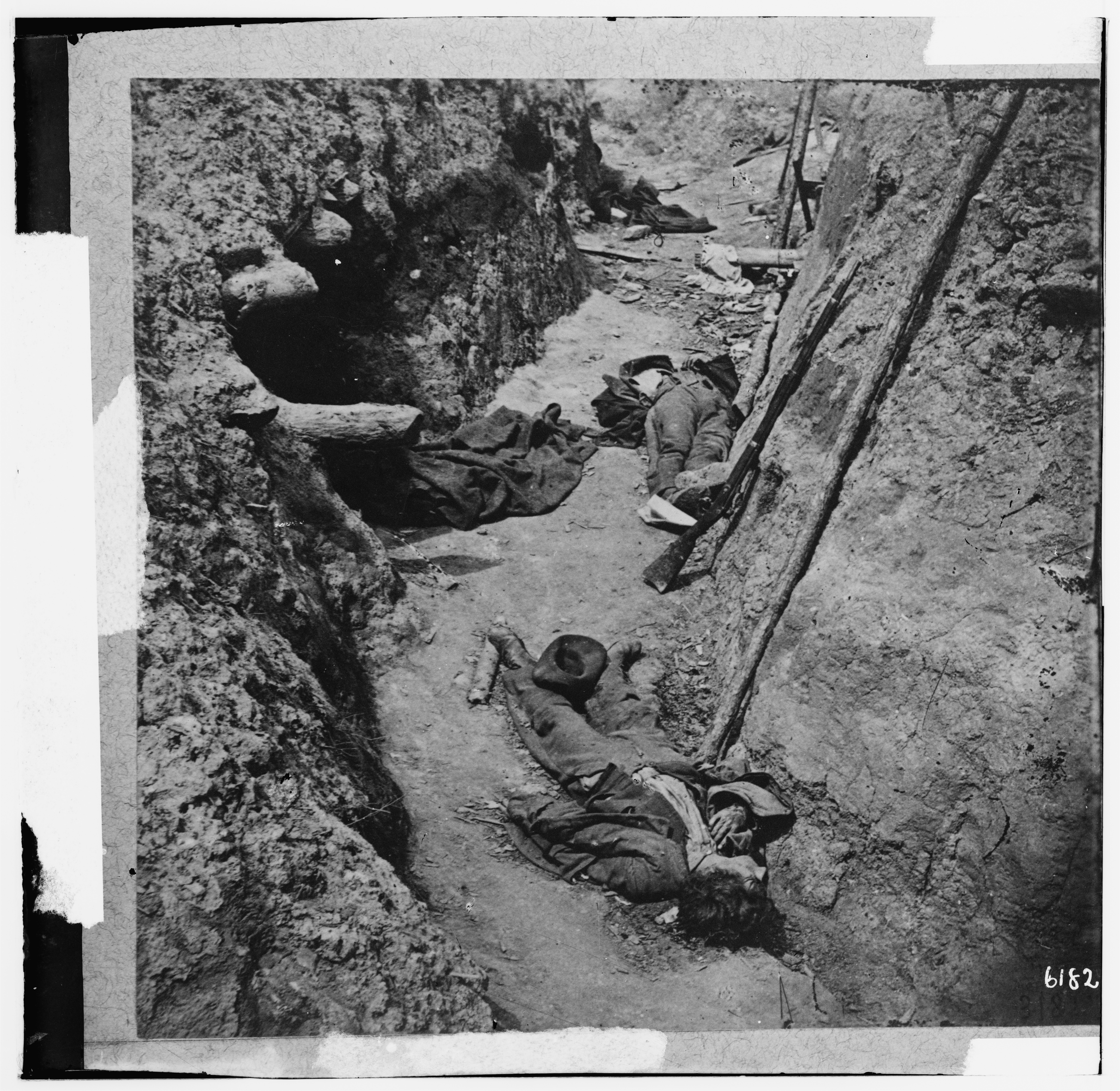

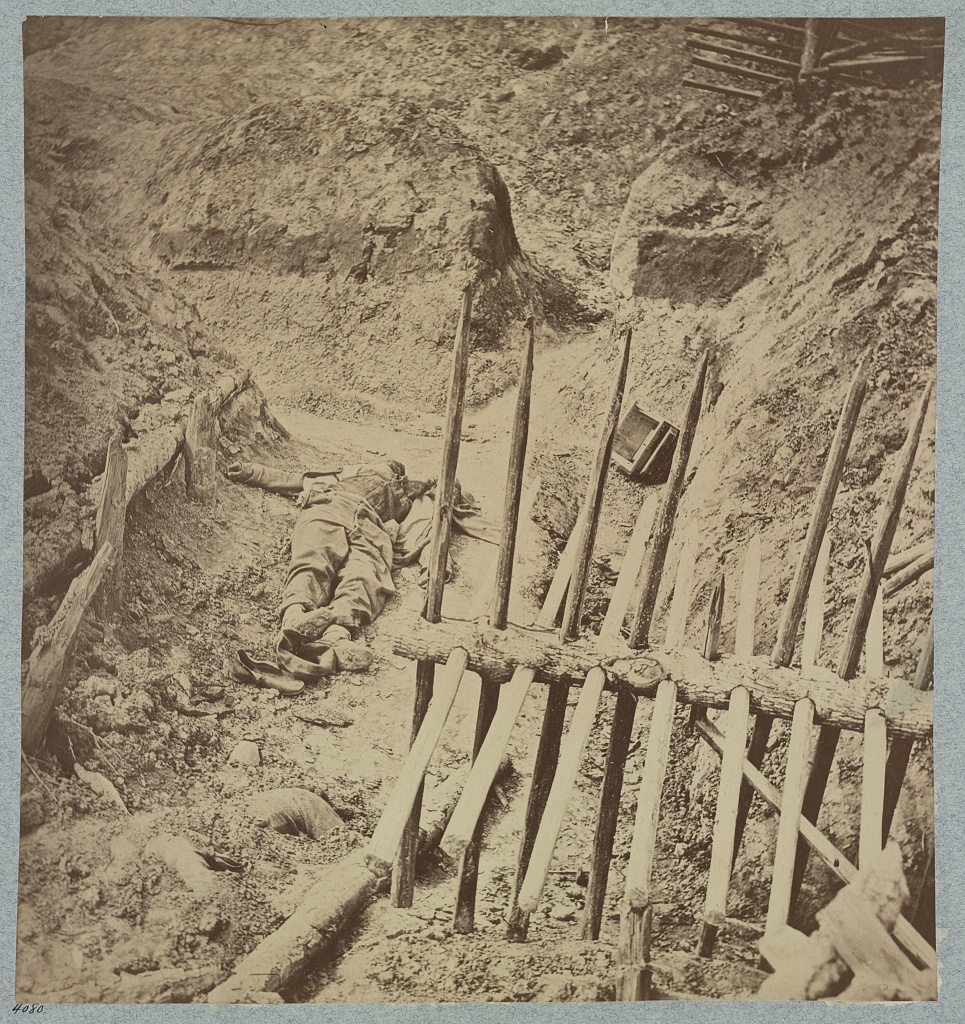

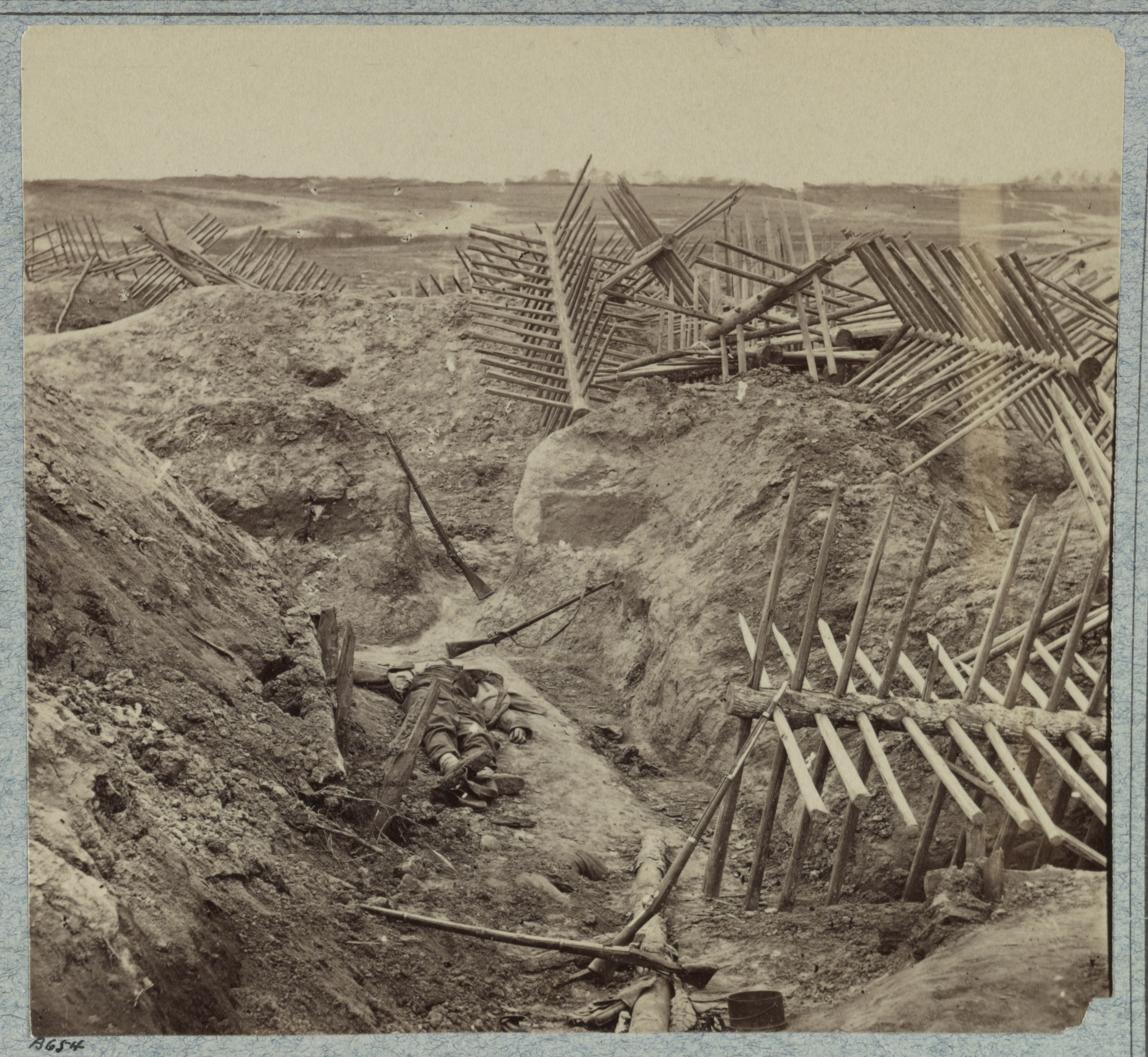

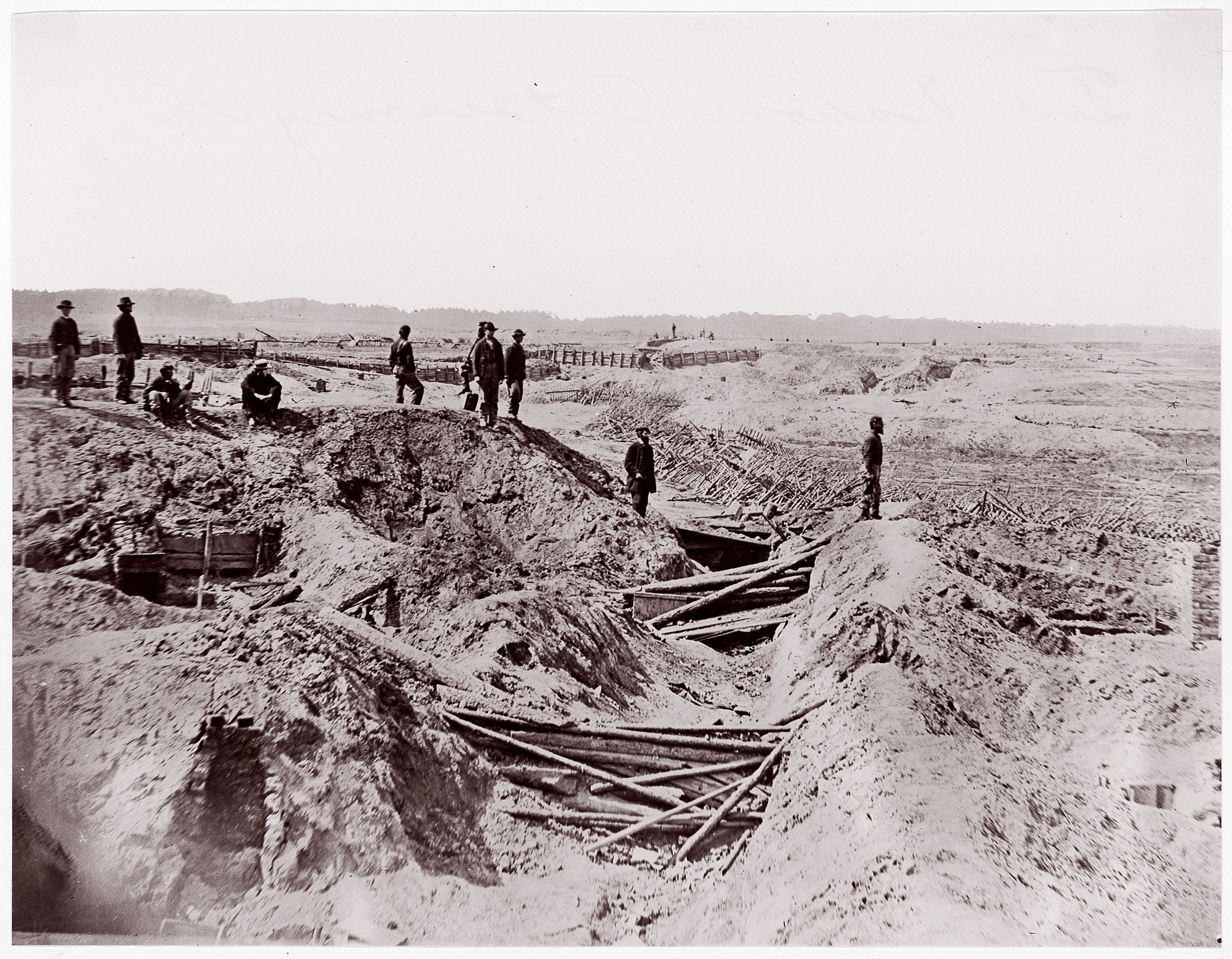
Fort Mahone

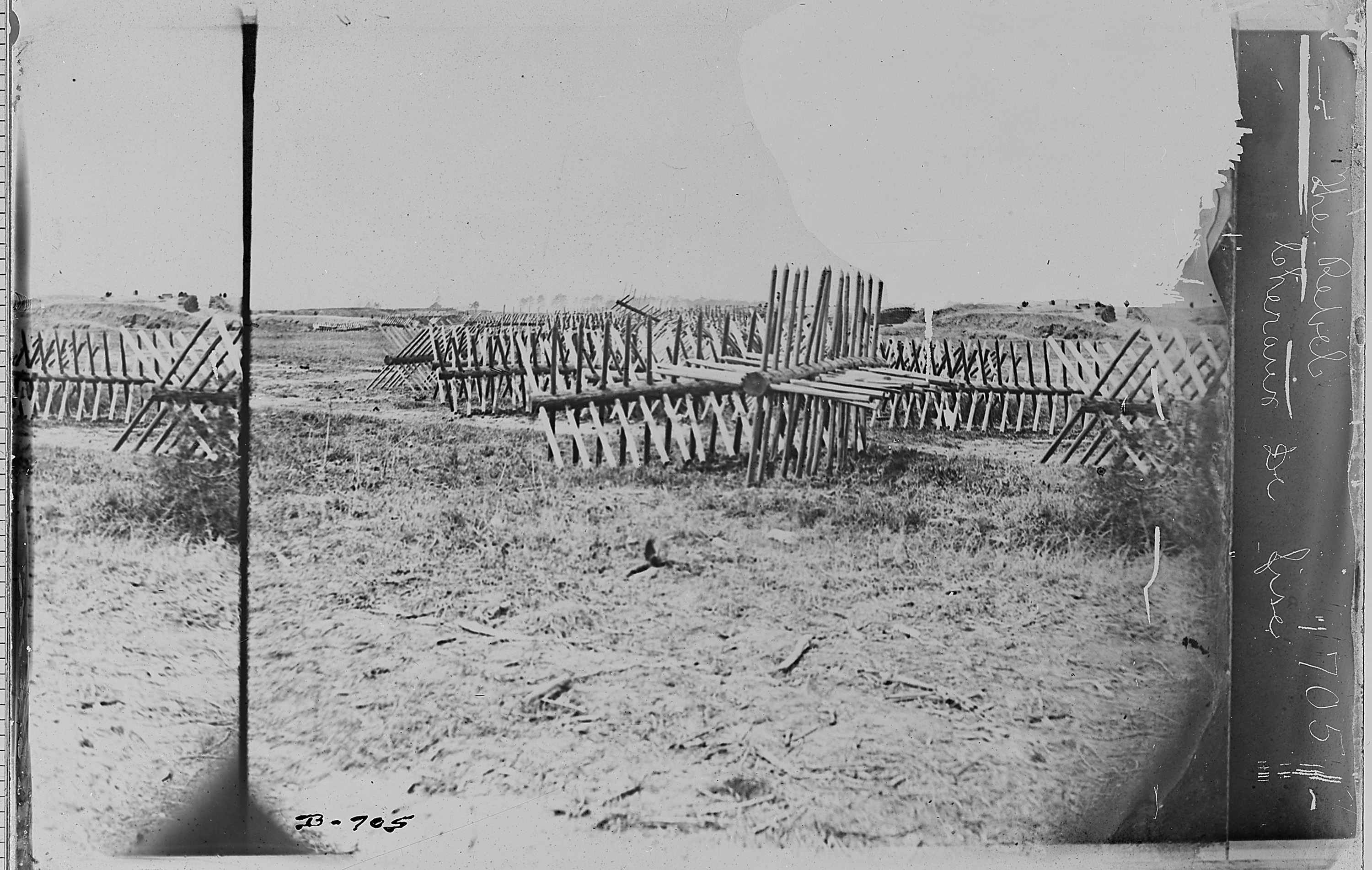
Rebel obstructions in front of Fort Mahone

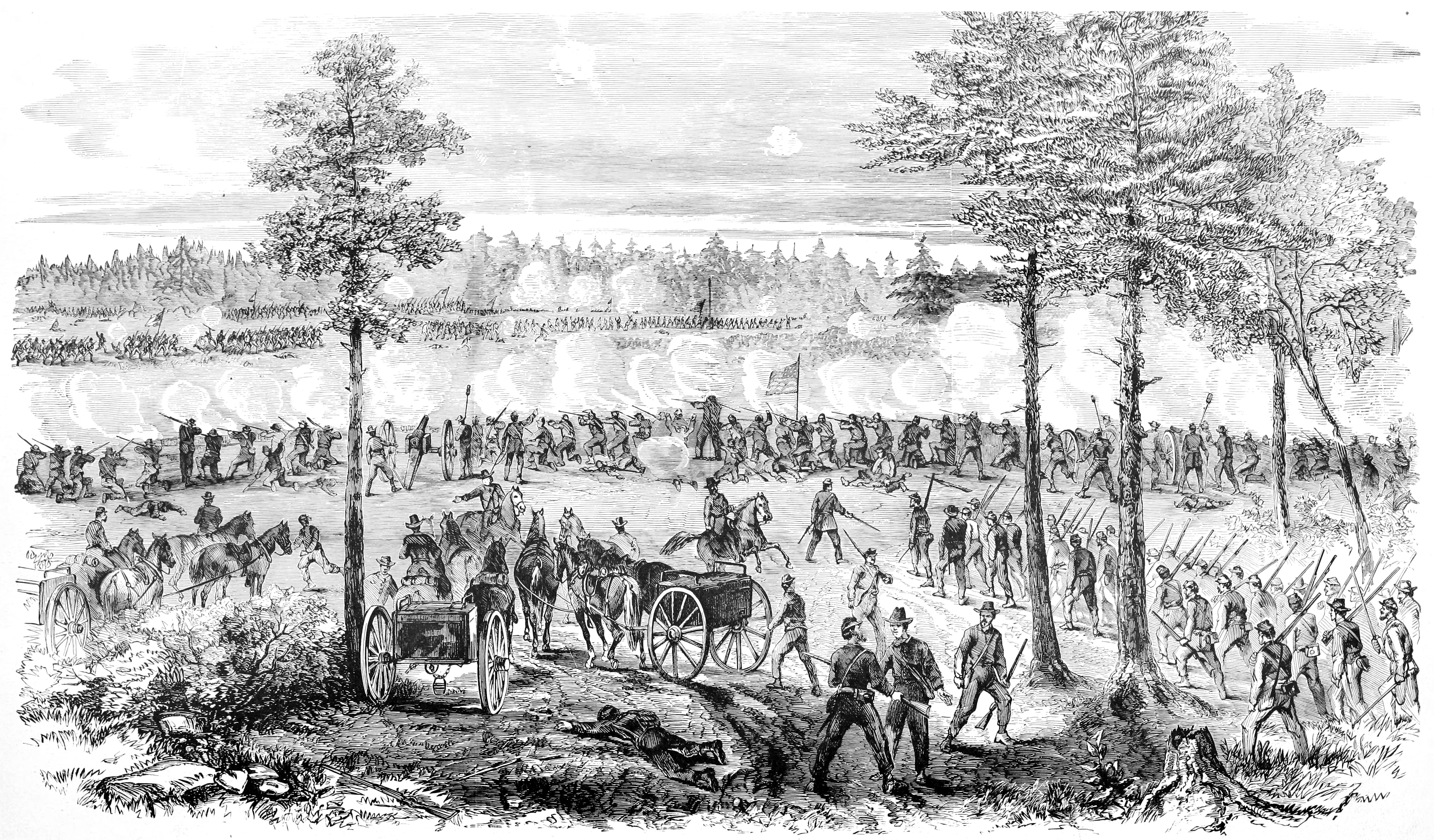
Confederate troops attacking Union positions near Ream's station on August 25, 1864

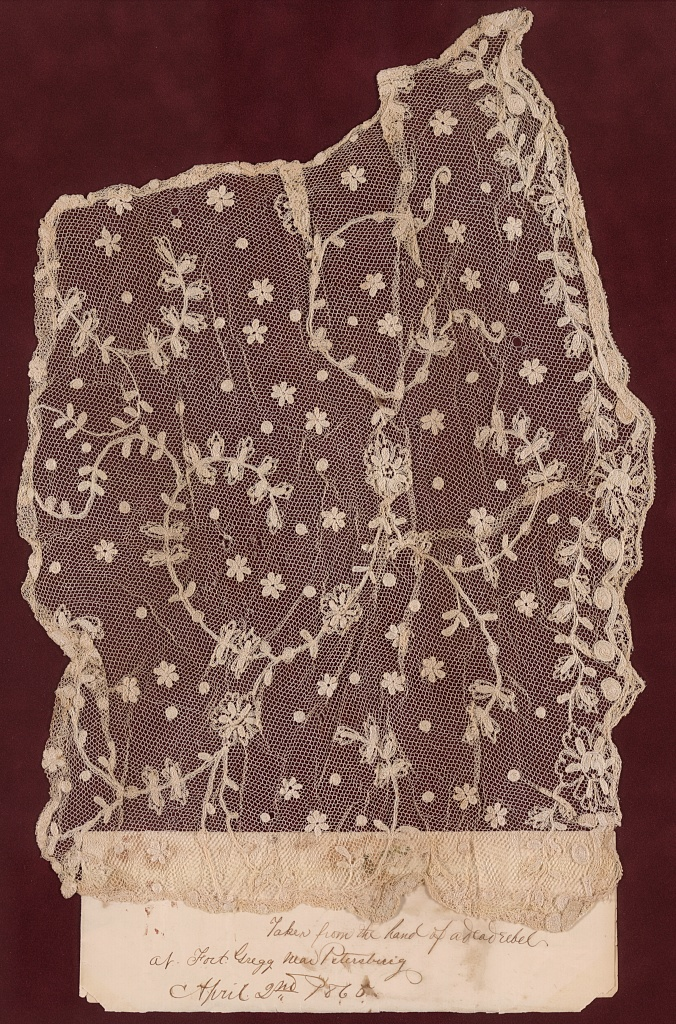
A piece of lace with accompanying handwritten note: "Taken from the hand of a dead rebel at Fort Gregg near Petersburg, April 2nd, 1865" (Liljenquist collection, Library of Congress)

== Classifying the campaigns ==
Military historians do not agree on precise boundaries between the campaigns of this era. This article uses the classification maintained by the U.S. National Park Service's American Battlefield Protection Program.

An alternative classification is maintained by West Point; in their Atlas of American Wars (Esposito, 1959), the siege of Petersburg ends with the Union assault and breakthrough of April 2. The remainder of the war in Virginia is classified as "Grant's Pursuit of Lee to Appomattox Court House (3–9 April 1865)". Trudeau's Last Citadel conforms to this classification.

== Battlefield preservation ==
The various historic sites and battlegrounds related to the siege of Petersburg are spread out across a vast area in the Petersburg vicinity. These sites and battlefields are primarily preserved by the National Park Service as the Petersburg National Battlefield, which features 13 separate sites on a 33-mile driving tour. The park's primary sections are the City Point Unit, where Grant had his headquarters; the Eastern Front battlefield, which features the Crater and the main visitor center; the Five Forks battlefield and the Poplar Grove National Cemetery. The siege-ending "Breakthrough" battlefield is preserved as Pamplin Historical Park, a privately owned park open to the public. In addition, the American Battlefield Trust and its partners have acquired and preserved more than 130 acres (0.53 km^{2}) of battlefield land in five transactions since 2005, including a 33-acre parcel where Hill was killed on April 2, 1865.

== See also ==
- Bibliography of Ulysses S. Grant
- Armies in the American Civil War
- Battles of the American Civil War
