= James M. Bell (U.S. Army brigadier general) =

U.S. Army brigadier general

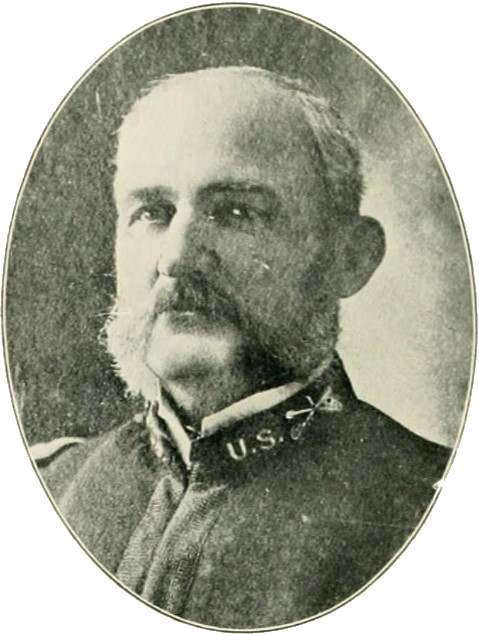
- From 1902's A Military Album, Containing Over One Thousand Portraits of Commissioned Officers Who Served in the Spanish–American War
- Born: October 1, 1837; Williamsburg, Pennsylvania, U.S.
- Died: September 17, 1919 (aged 81); Hermosa Beach, California, U.S.
- Burial place: San Francisco National Cemetery
- Education: Wittenberg College
- Spouse: Emilie Mary Hones (m. 1872–1919)
- Military career
- Allegiance: Union; United States
- Service: Union Army; United States Army
- Service years: 1862–1866 (Union Army); 1866–1901 (U.S. Army)
- Rank: Brigadier General
- Unit: U.S. Army Cavalry Branch
- Commands: Independent Troop, Pennsylvania Volunteer Cavalry; Troop D, 13th Pennsylvania Cavalry Regiment; Company F, 7th Cavalry Regiment; 1st Squadron, 1st Cavalry Regiment; 27th Infantry Regiment; Bell's Expeditionary Brigade; Third Military District, Department of Southern Luzon
- Wars: American Civil War; American Indian Wars; Spanish–American War; Philippine–American War

James M. Bell (October 1, 1837 – September 17, 1919) was a career officer in the United States Army. A Union Army veteran of the American Civil War, Bell went on to serve in the American Indian Wars, Spanish–American War, and Philippine–American War, and attained the rank of brigadier general.

A native of Williamsburg, Pennsylvania, Bell graduated from Wittenberg College in 1862 and enlisted in the Union Army. Commissioned as a first lieutenant in the 86th Ohio Infantry Regiment, he served with this regiment until June 1863, when he was promoted to captain as commander of the Independent Troop, Pennsylvania Cavalry, which he led until August, when he assumed command of a troop in the 13th Pennsylvania Cavalry Regiment, with which he served until the end of the war. Engagements in which Bell took part included the Battle of the Wilderness and the Second Battle of Ream's Station. He received brevet promotion to captain for heroism at the Wilderness, and major for Ream's Station.

In June 1866, Bell accepted a regular army commission as a second lieutenant in the 7th Cavalry Regiment. He served on the frontier during the American Indian Wars, and was promoted to first lieutenant (1867) and captain (1876). He took part in the 1868 Battle of the Washita River and the 1877 Battle of Canyon Creek. Following Canyon Creek, Bell received brevet promotion to lieutenant colonel. Bell served as an escort for the Northern Pacific Railway construction crew during the summers of 1880, 1881, and 1882, and was promoted to major in 1896.

Bell served in the Philippines during the Spanish–American War and Philippine–American War, receiving promotion to lieutenant colonel of the 13th Cavalry Regiment in 1898 and promotion to colonel as commander of the 27th Infantry Regiment in 1899. In 1900, Bell was promoted to brigadier general of United States Volunteers. He commanded an ad hoc brigade, Bell's Expeditionary Brigade, during operations in the Camarines Provinces, followed by command of the Third Military District of Southern Luzon. He was military governor of the Third Military District from April 1900 to March 1901.

Bell left the army upon reaching the mandatory retirement age of 64 in October 1901, and resided in New London, Connecticut and Hermosa Beach, California. He died in Hermosa Beach on September 17, 1919. Bell was buried at San Francisco National Cemetery.

== Early life ==
James Montgomery Bell was born in Williamsburg, Pennsylvania on October 1, 1837, a son of William B. Bell and Susan (Good) Bell. He was raised and educated in Logan Township, then attended Wittenberg College in Springfield, Ohio. He received his AB degree in 1862, and he later received an AM.

== Early career ==
After graduating from college, Bell joined the Union Army for the American Civil War by enlisting as a private in a company of the 86th Ohio Infantry Regiment. The company contained several of his Wittenberg classmates, and after serving from May to June, they elected him as their first lieutenant. He served with the 86th Ohio until September 1862, after which he joined the Independent Troop of Pennsylvania Cavalry, which he commanded as a captain. His troop took part in several engagements on Pennsylvania's southern border in order to prevent units of the Confederate States Army from invading the state, including the October 1862 Raid on Chambersburg.

In October 1863, Bell joined the 13th Pennsylvania Cavalry Regiment, with which he served until the end of the war. Battles in which he participated included Mine Run, Wilderness, Spotsylvania Court House, North Anna, Haw's Shop, Trevilian Station, Deep Bottom, Ream's Station, Coggin's Point (wounded), White Oak Road, and Hatcher's Run. In March 1865, Bell served in North Carolina, where his cavalry troop opened communications between the forces commanded by William Tecumseh Sherman and those of John Schofield. While serving with Sherman's army, he took part in the Battle of Morrisville and Battle of Bentonville, and was present for the surrender of Confederate forces under Joseph E. Johnston near Durham, North Carolina in April 1865. From May to July 1865, Bell performed post-war occupation duty in Fayetteville, North Carolina. Bell later received brevet promotions to first lieutenant and captain in the regular army in recognition of his heroism at the Battle of the Wilderness, and major in the regular army for heroism at Ream's Station.

== Continued career ==
In July 1866, Bell was commissioned as a second lieutenant in the regular army's 7th Cavalry Regiment. In January 1867, he joined the regiment at Fort Riley, Kansas. He took part in several American Indian Wars engagements and was promoted to first lieutenant in April 1867. He served as the regiment's assistant quartermaster from April to September 1868. From September to November 1868, he was assistant quartermaster of the combined 7th Cavalry and 3rd Infantry Regiment units commanded by Alfred Sully at Fort Dodge, Kansas. He then returned to assistant quartermaster duties at Fort Riley, and was in the field with 7th Cavalry forces commanded by George Armstrong Custer during the winter of 1868 to 1869, including participation in the November 1868 Battle of the Washita River. During this fight, Bell was commended for leading wagon trains through enemy fire and difficult terrain to deliver ammunition.

In March 1872, Bell married Emiline "Emilie" Mary Hone in Pittsburgh, Pennsylvania. They remained married until his death and had no children. From 1872 to 1874, he took part in the Northern Boundary Expedition that surveyed the Canada–United States border in several western U.S. states and Canadian provinces. Because of this detached duty, he did not take part in the 7th Cavalry's Yellowstone Expedition of 1873 or Black Hills Expedition of 1874. He was on an extended leave of absence in 1876, so he did not take part in the Battle of the Little Bighorn; he was promoted to captain as a result of George Yates's death in this fight.

In December 1876, Major Marcus Reno was accused of making unwanted advances to Emilie Bell while in command of 7th Cavalry units stationed at Fort Abercrombie, Dakota Territory, and during Bell's absence. A general court-martial was held in Saint Paul, Minnesota on May 8, 1877. Reno was found guilty on six of seven charges, and sentenced to dismissal from the army. President Rutherford B. Hayes subsequently reduced this sentence to a suspension of two years. In September 1877, Bell took part in the Battle of Canyon Creek against the Nez Perce, for which he received a brevet promotion to lieutenant colonel.

== Later career ==
Bell performed escort duty for construction crews of the Northern Pacific Railway during the summers of 1880, 1881, and 1882. He was promoted to major in the 1st Cavalry Regiment in April 1896 and commanded the regiment's 1st Squadron. During the Spanish–American War, Bell served in Cuba and took part in the Siege of Santiago. He was wounded during the Battle of Las Guasimas.

In July 1899, Bell was promoted to colonel of United States Volunteers and assigned to command the 27th Infantry Regiment. In January 1900, Bell was promoted to permanent lieutenant colonel of the 8th Cavalry Regiment. In the same month, he was promoted to brigadier general of volunteers. He received promotion to permanent colonel in March 1901, and permanent brigadier general in September 1901.

Bell served in the Philippines during the Philippine–American War. During this service, he commanded Bell's Expeditionary Brigade as part of operations in the Camarines Provinces. He then commanded the Third Military District of Southern Luzon. From April 1900 to March 1901, Bell was military governor of the Third Military District. He retired upon reaching the age of 64 in October 1901.

== Retirement and death ==
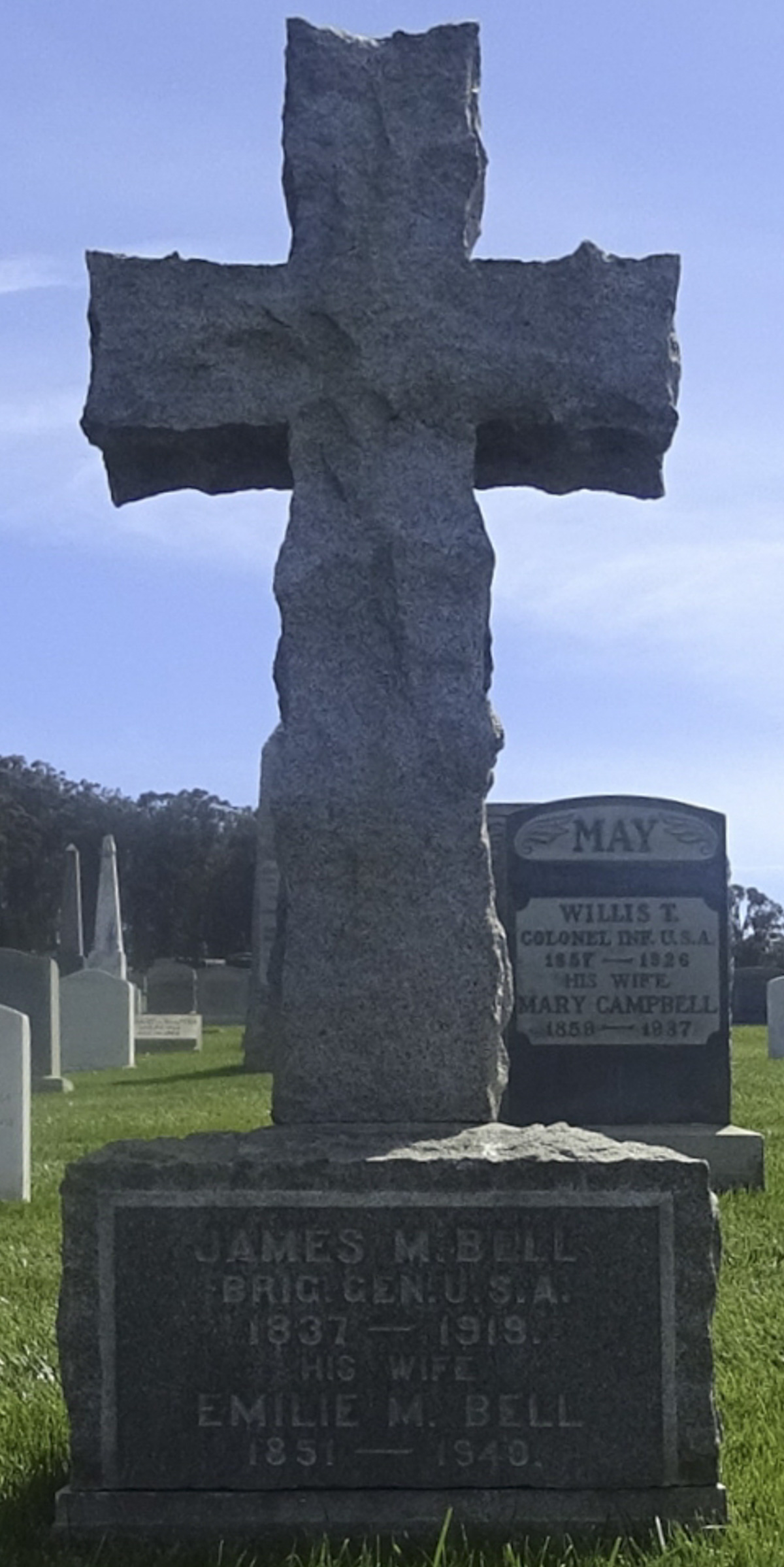
Bell's gravestone at San Francisco National Cemetery

Bell was a 30th degree member of Scottish Rite Masonry. In addition, he was a member of the Military Order of the Loyal Legion of the United States, Society of the Army of Santiago de Cuba, Military Order of Foreign Wars, Washington, D.C.'s Metropolitan Club, and New York City's Army and Navy Club.

In 1918, Congressman James V. McClintic of Oklahoma introduced legislation that would have allowed the president to award the Medal of Honor to Bell for his heroism at the Washita battle. The bill was under consideration when Bell died, so it was never acted on.

In retirement, Bell resided in New London, Connecticut and Hermosa Beach, California. He died in Hermosa Beach on September 17, 1919. He was buried at San Francisco National Cemetery.
