= Battle of Ream's Station =

Battle of Ream's Station may refer to the following battles during the American Civil War:

- First Battle of Ream's Station, June 29, 1864
- Second Battle of Ream's Station, August 25, 1864
