= Battle of Sappony Church =

Battle of the American Civil War

Coordinates: 36°56′45.2″N 77°27′11″W

- Part of the American Civil War
- A map of the Union raiders' route
Date	June 28, 1864
Location	Sussex County, Virginia
Result	Confederate victory

Belligerents
United States (Union)	(Confederate States of America) CSA (Confederacy)

Commanders and leaders
James H. Wilson; August V. Kautz	William Henry Fitzhugh Lee; Wade Hampton

Strength
4,000	5,000

Casualties and losses
Unknown	Unknown

The Battle of Sappony Church, also known as the Battle of Stony Creek Depot, was an engagement of the American Civil War, between the Confederate States of America and the Union, which took place on June 28, 1864, during the Wilson-Kautz Raid of the Richmond–Petersburg Campaign.

== Background ==
Petersburg, Virginia, was the supply center for the Confederate capital of Richmond, and was under siege by Union forces under the command of Lt. Gen. Ulysses S. Grant. Petersburg was supplied by rail along three remaining lines, the Richmond and Petersburg Railroad; the South Side Railroad, which reached to Lynchburg in the west; and the Weldon Railroad, also called the Petersburg and Weldon Railroad, which led to Weldon, North Carolina, and the Confederacy's only remaining major port, Wilmington, North Carolina. On June 22, Grant dispatched a 3,300 strong cavalry unit under the command of Brig. Gens. James H. Wilson and August V. Kautz to cut the rail lines. This led to a series of raids that destroyed 60 miles (97 km) of rail track and culminated in the Battle of Staunton River Bridge on June 25, where the raiders were defeated and began a retreat back to Union positions.

Since the outset of the raid, the Union force had been pursued by Confederate Maj. Gen. W.H.F. "Rooney" Lee. Lee's forces had finally been able to catch up to the Union cavalry at Staunton Bridge, and had attacked them in the rear and then continued to pursue them as they retired to Union lines.

== Battle ==
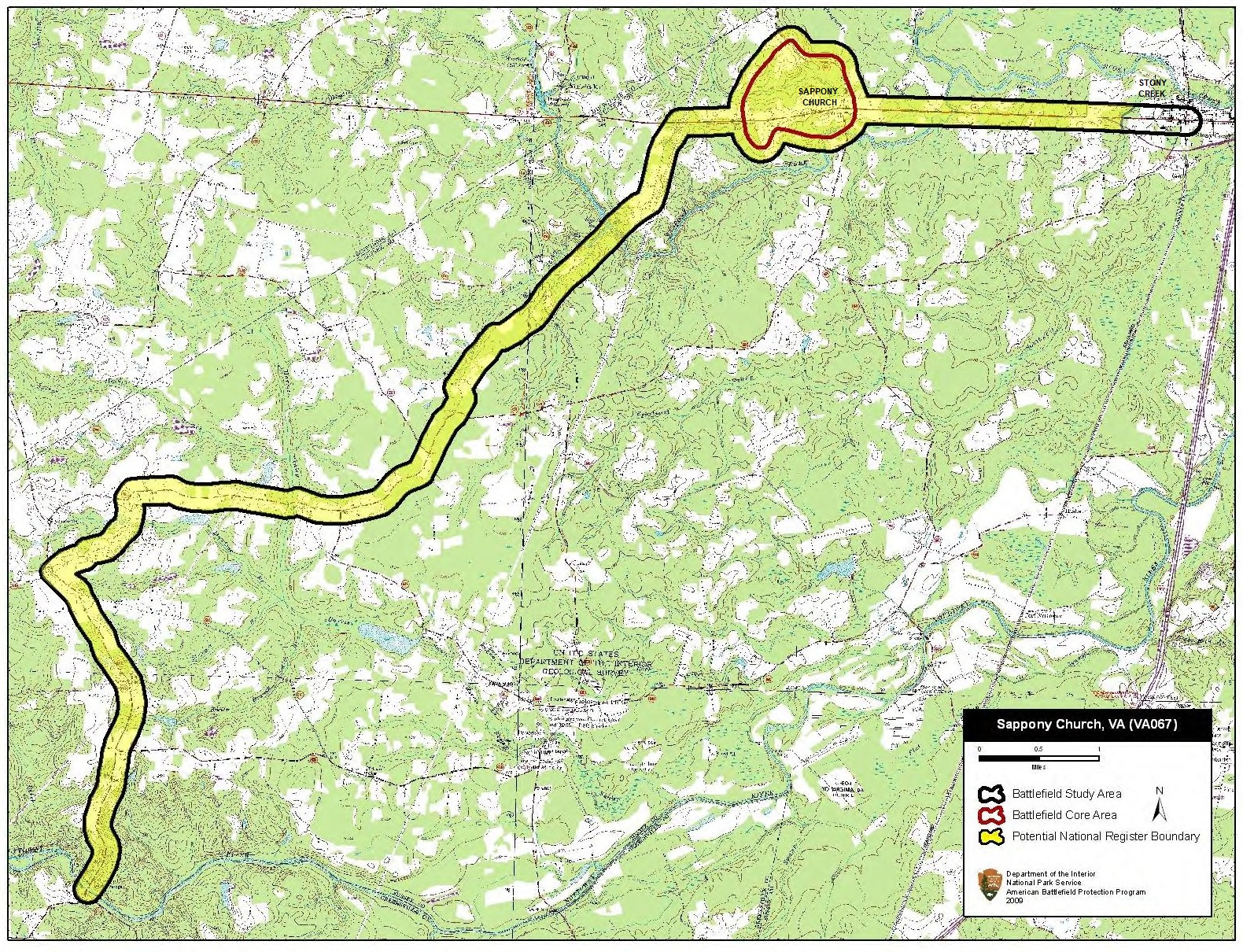
Map of Sappony Church Battlefield core and study areas by the American Battlefield Protection Program.

On June 28, the Union cavalry crossed the Nottoway River and reached the Stony Creek Depot on the Weldon Railroad. Here, they were attacked by Confederate Maj. Gen. Wade Hampton and his cavalry division. During the resulting battle, Lee arrived on the field with his own forces and attacked the Union raiders. By nightfall, Kautz and Wilson ordered their forces to fall back in an attempt to reach Reams Railway Station to the north. During the retreat, a large number of slaves who had been accompanying the Union forces were left behind.
