= Wilson–Kautz Raid =

Wilson-Kautz Raid
- Part of the American Civil War
- A map depicting the circuitous route taken by Union cavalry forces in the Wilson-Kautz Raid
Date	June 22 – July 1, 1864
Location	Brunswick, Charlotte, Dinwiddie, Greensville, Halifax, Lunenburg, Mecklenburg, Nottoway, and Sussex counties of Virginia
Result	Inconclusive See § Aftermath

Belligerents
United States (Union)	(Confederate States of America) CSA (Confederacy)

Commanders and leaders
James H. Wilson; August Kautz	William Mahone; William Henry Fitzhugh Lee; Wade Hampton

Strength
2 Union cavalry divisions (5,000)	Lee's Confederate cavalry division (?), Hampton's cavalry division (4 brigades), Mahone's infantry division (?)

Casualties and losses
1,500 and 12 guns	?

The Wilson–Kautz Raid was a cavalry operation in south central Virginia in late June 1864, during the American Civil War. Occurring early in the Richmond-Petersburg Campaign, the raid was conducted by Union cavalry under Brigadier Generals James H. Wilson and August Kautz, who were ordered to cut railroads between Lynchburg, Virginia, and the vital Confederate rail supply center at Petersburg. While the raid had the intended effect of disrupting Confederate rail communications for several weeks, the raiding force lost much of its artillery, all of its supply train, and almost a third of the original force, mostly to Confederate capture.

== Background ==
Immediately following the Overland Campaign, Union Army commander Lt. Gen. Ulysses S. Grant proposed to encircle both the Confederate capitol at Richmond and its strategic supply center ten miles south at Petersburg. While infantry began the entrenchment activities of investment, Grant determined to take advantage of new positions to launch light operations with the objective of disrupting rail activity.

On June 22, 5,000 Union cavalry and 16 artillery pieces were pulled from the siege of Petersburg and sent, under the command of Brig. Gens. James H. Wilson and August V. Kautz, to destroy the lines of supply.

== Opposing forces ==
Union commanders
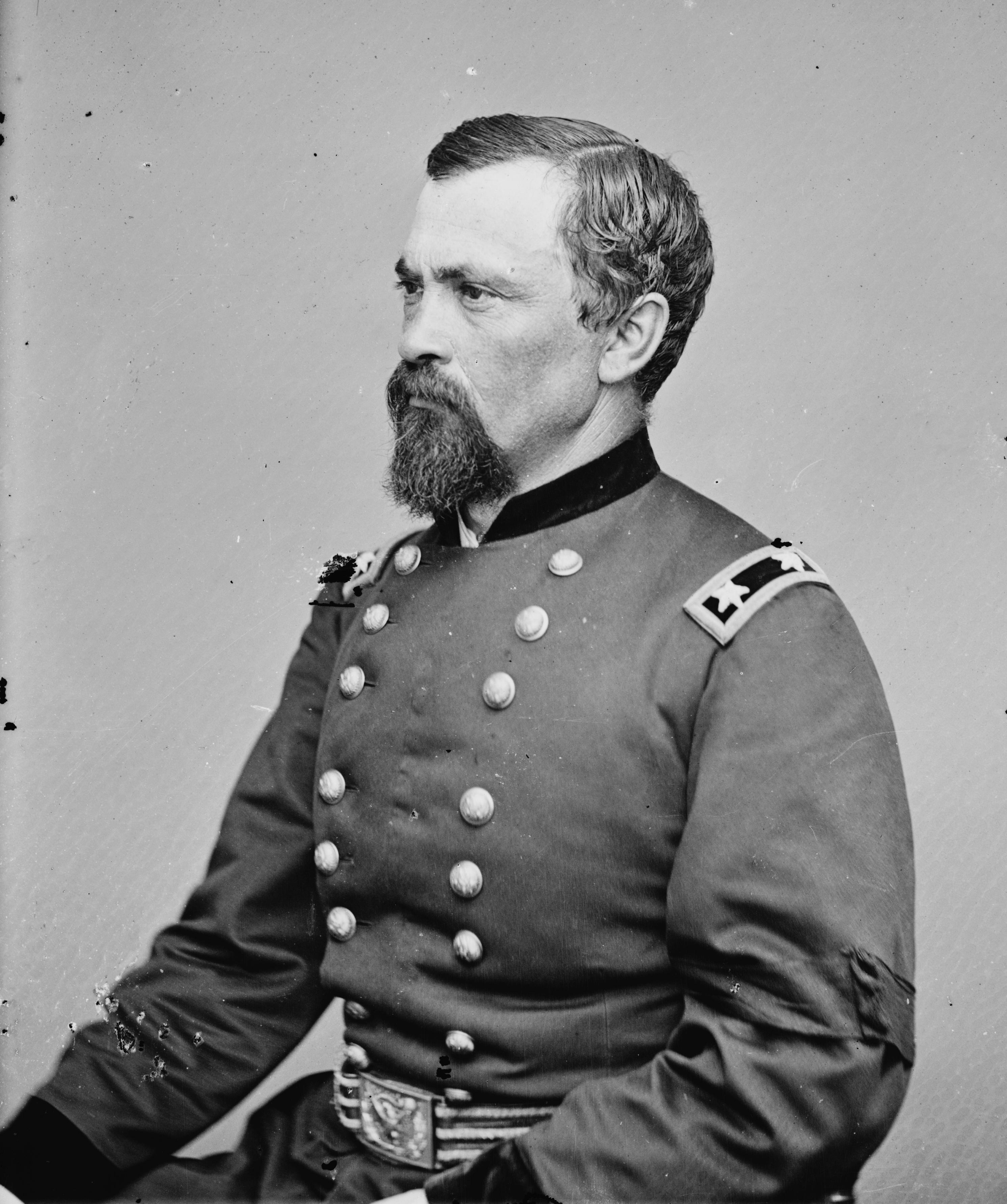
Brig. Gen.
August Kautz, USA

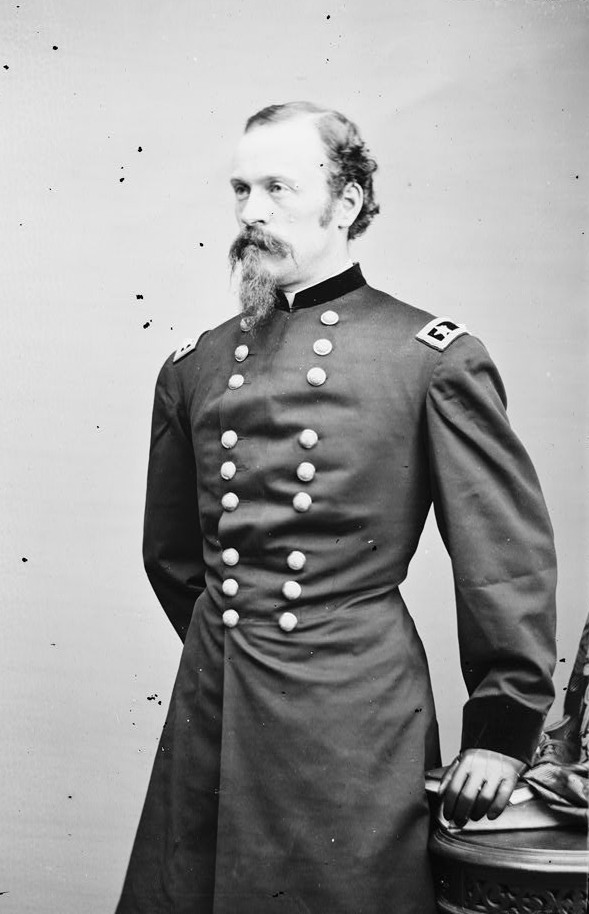
Brig. Gen.
James H. Wilson, USA

Confederate commanders
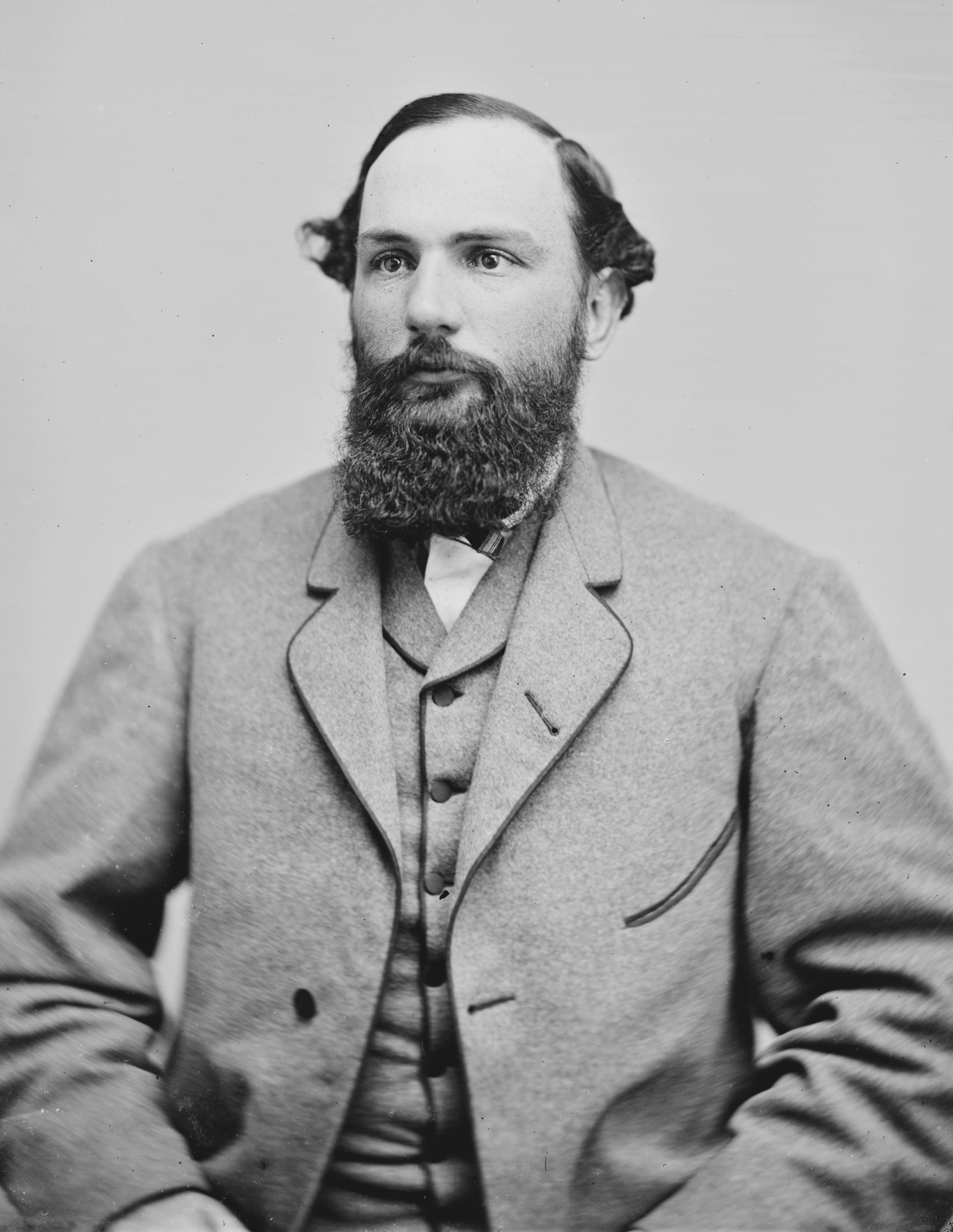
Maj. Gen.
William H.F. Lee, CSA

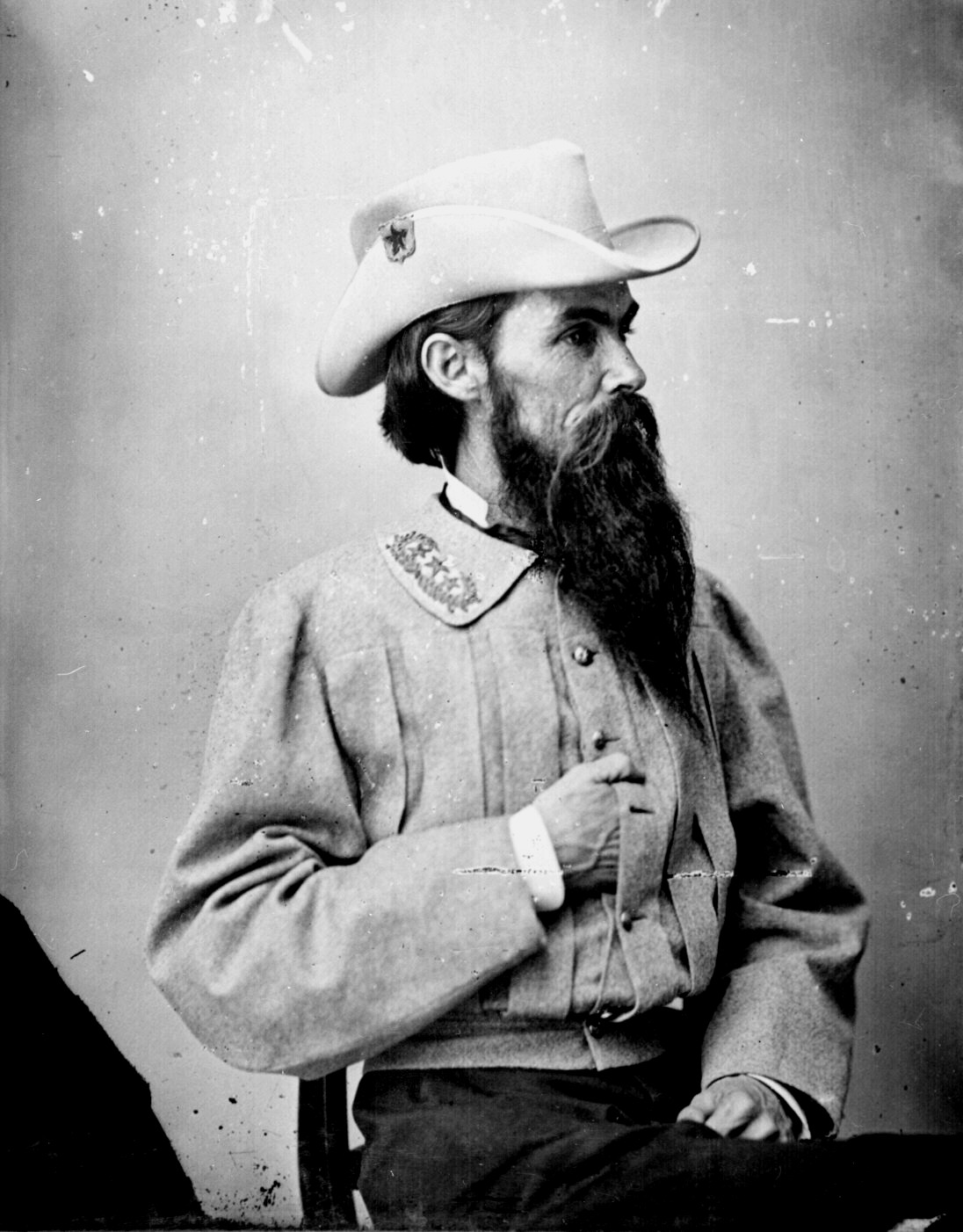
Brig. Gen.
William Mahone, CSA

== Battles ==
Battle of Staunton River Bridge (June 25, 1864) 36°53′14″N 76°42′13″W
Despite pursuit and harassment from Confederate cavalry under the command of Maj. Gen. W.H.F. "Rooney" Lee, the Union cavalry succeeded in destroying 60 miles of railway in the first three days. Approaching the bridge over the Staunton River, Union scouts saw what appeared to be Confederate reinforcements arriving by railcar, but was instead part of an elaborate ruse intended to delay attack from the rapidly advancing Union cavalry force. Confederate detachment commander Captain Benjamin L. Farinholt utilized the time to assemble a force of "Old Men and Young Boys" drawn from neighboring counties which included regulars, reservists, local volunteers and six cannon. When the expected Union cavalry charge finally occurred, Farinholt's force, deployed in prepared positions, repulsed the superior force. A few hours later, Lee's pursuing cavalry caught up with Wilson's rear guard. Despite the earlier success, Kautz was unable to destroy the railroad bridge, and the force turned back to the east.

Battle of Sappony Church (June 28, 1864) 36°56′45″N 77°27′11″W
After more than a week of continuous operation in enemy-held territory, Wilson's and Kautz's brigades crossed the Nottoway River, reached the Stony Creek Depot on the Wilmington and Weldon Railroad and were within ten miles of friendly lines. Before they reached Stony Creek, they met an attack from Maj. Gen. Wade Hampton's cavalry division astride their path. Lee's cavalry brigade again caught the Union force in the rear, and the Federals were forced northward toward the crossing at Ream's Station.

First Battle of Ream's Station (June 29, 1864) 37.0959°N 77.4226°W
The exhausted Union raiders had moved toward Ream's Station expecting it to be in friendly hands, but finding themselves almost surrounded and under attack by Confederate infantry under Brig. Gen. William Mahone and Lee's relentless pursuit, brigade commanders Wilson and Kautz were forced to abandon their artillery, burn their remaining supply wagons and, separated, attempt breakouts eastward toward Union forces under Maj. Gen. Benjamin F. Butler. Kautz's brigade moved cross country toward the southeast, where it met friendly lines after sundown. After suffering heavy casualties, Wilson's brigade withdrew to the southwest, circling eastward again to recross the Nottoway River and finally northward to safety at Light House Point on July 2.

== Aftermath ==
Along with the arguable Union loss at the Jerusalem Plank Road, the raid's partial failure (resulting in only moderate damage to Confederate infrastructure but with high casualties) added to frustrations for Grant, Lincoln, and the Northern populace. In spite of pinning Lee into a defensive position at Petersburg, Jubal Early's raid on Washington two weeks later suggested that Lee still retained some freedom of maneuver. Nevertheless, some argue that Grant still considered the raid an overall success. He later commented that “The damage to the enemy in the expedition more than compensated for the losses we sustained.”

== See also ==
- Battles of the American Civil War
- Bibliography of Ulysses S. Grant
- Bibliography of the American Civil War
