= Battle of Staunton River Bridge =

Battle of the American Civil War

Coordinates: 36.8857°N 78.7044°W

- Part of the American Civil War
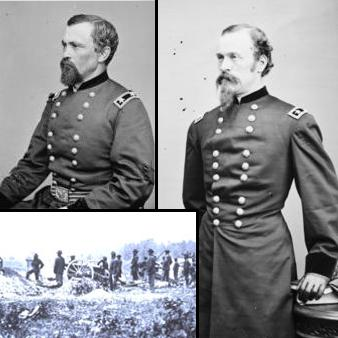
- Clockwise from upper left: Brigadier General August V. Kautz, Brigadier General James H. Wilson, Confederate artillery firing across the river
Date	June 25, 1864
Location	Halifax County, Virginia; Charlotte County, Virginia
Result	Confederate victory

Belligerents
United States (Union)	(Confederate States of America) CSA (Confederacy)

Commanders and leaders
James H. Wilson; August V. Kautz	William Henry Fitzhugh Lee; Benjamin L. Farinholt

Strength
5,000	4,100

Casualties and losses
116 total 42 killed 44 wounded 30 missing/captured	34 total 10 killed 24 wounded

The Battle of Staunton River Bridge was an engagement on June 25, 1864, between Union and Confederate forces during Wilson-Kautz Raid of the American Civil War. The battle took place around the Staunton River Bridge, over the Staunton River, in Halifax and Charlotte counties, Virginia.

== Background ==
During the month of June 1864, Confederate General Robert E. Lee was commanding the Army of Northern Virginia in the defense of Petersburg, Virginia, against the Union siege under the command of Union Lt. Gen. Ulysses S. Grant. The Confederate forces were dependent on the flow of supplies from the south and west along the South Side and Richmond and Danville Railroad lines, and Grant realized that without these supplies the Confederates would be forced to abandon Petersburg.

Thus, Grant decided to dispatch Union cavalry to raid the rail lines and destroy them, thus cutting Lee off from his supplies. On June 22, 5,000 Union cavalry and 16 artillery pieces were pulled from the siege of Petersburg and sent, under the command of Brig. Gens. James H. Wilson and August V. Kautz, to destroy the lines of supply. During the next three days, despite pursuit and harassment from Confederate cavalry under the command of Maj. Gen. W.H.F. "Rooney" Lee, the Union cavalry succeeded in destroying 60 miles (97 km) of railway.

== Battle ==
The Staunton River Bridge runs south-southwest to north-northeast over the River Staunton (which itself runs northwest to southeast) and along it runs the Richmond and Danville Railroad, a vital part of the supply system for the besieged Army of Northern Virginia. The bridge was defended by 296 Confederate reservists under the command of Captain Benjamin L. Farinholt, who had been warned on June 23 that Union cavalry forces were approaching his position. Heeding this warning, Farinholt dispatched couriers to the nearby areas of Halifax, Charlotte, and Mecklenburg in order to recruit additional forces, and on the morning of the battle, 642 reinforcements arrived, of whom 150 were regular soldiers and the rest volunteer fighters.

Realizing that he would be under the surveillance of Union scouts, Farinholt ordered a train to run continually along the line from his position to a station further south in order to create the impression that he was receiving continual reinforcements. The illusion was further strengthened by Mrs. Nancy Mcphail, Mulberry Hill plantation owner's wife, who in addition to hosting Union wounded during the battle, informed the Union forces that up to 10,000 Confederate forces awaited them at the bridge. In reality, there were only 938 men.

As well as these 938 men, Farinholt commanded two earthwork sites on the southern bank of the river, and he positioned his 6 artillery pieces accordingly, with four in the fortress on the Eastern side of the rail line, and two on the western side. He also had constructed a network of concealed rifle trenches between the earthwork defenses and the bridge itself.

At 3:45 p.m., according to reports by Farinholt, the Union forces arrived on the northern bank of the river "within a mile of my main redoubt." However, Farinholt's opening salvo fell short. Kautz dismounted with his cavalry opposite the bridge, and advanced from both the east and the west.

Wilson-Kautz Raid, June 22–July 1

Colonel Robert M. West, who commanded the Union forces attacking from the western side of the rail line, attempted to quickly capture the bridge and hold it for sufficient time to set fire to it, but his attack was repulsed. Meanwhile, the Union forces reached and occupied a drainage ditch situated 150 yards (140 m) from the bridge, from which they organized four unsuccessful charges, all of which were repulsed by fire from Farinholt's concealed trench systems, which led to heavy Union casualties.

Around sunset, Rooney Lee arrived on the field with the Confederate cavalry forces that had been pursuing the Union raiders. Lee attacked the Union forces in the rear, and Wilson was forced to retire by midnight.

The following morning, Farinholt advanced with skirmishers onto the vacated Union positions, taking 8 prisoners and burying 42 Union dead. Casualties on the Union side amounted to 42 killed, 44 wounded, and 30 missing or captured; Confederate losses were 10 killed and 24 wounded.

== Aftermath ==
The defense of the Staunton River Bridge ensured the survival of the Richmond & Danville rail supply line, which was a key part of the chain supplying the besieged Confederate forces in Petersburg. However, Lee was forced to abandon Petersburg in April 1865 when his supply lines were finally cut.

Part of the area where the battle took place is now preserved as part of Staunton River Battlefield State Park, and the Confederate defensive fortifications are listed on the National Register of Historic Places.

== See also ==
- Battles of the American Civil War
- Bibliography of Ulysses S. Grant
- Bibliography of the American Civil War
