= Ispringen =

German municipality

- Municipality
- Coat of arms

- Location of Ispringen within Enzkreis district
- Interactive map of Ispringen
- Location within Germany Location within Baden-Württemberg
- Coordinates: 48°54′57″N 8°40′15″E
- Country: Germany
- State: Baden-Württemberg
- Admin. region: Karlsruhe
- District: Enzkreis

Area
  - Total: 8.21 km^{2} (3.17 sq mi)
- Elevation: 275 m (902 ft)

Population (2025-12-31)
  - Total: 5,891
  - Density: 718/km^{2} (1,860/sq mi)
- Time zone: UTC+01:00 (CET)
  - Summer (DST): UTC+02:00 (CEST)
- Postal codes: 75228
- Dialling codes: 07231
- Vehicle registration: PF
- Website: www.ispringen.de

Ispringen is a municipality in the district of Enz in Baden-Württemberg in Germany. The name of the town was first recorded in the early Middle Ages as 'Urspringen'. It refers to a natural spring which is the source of the Kämpfelbach, a small stream that ultimately empties into the Rhine. The town's coat-of-arms, yellow shears on a scarlet background, allude to the town's former main industry of raising sheep. The colours are common to communities in the area and derive from the coat-of-arms of the Grand Duchy of Baden.

== History ==
Ispringen was first mentioned in 1272. For most of its history it remained a relatively small village dominated by small livestock farms and orchards. In the fourteenth century the spiritual welfare (and by extension the temporal government) came under the patronage of the Dominican friary at Pforzheim. This remained the structure of local affairs until the upheaval of the Reformation. Following this the village came under the rule of the Duke of Baden, and would remain there until absorbed into the unified Germany. Under the Duke of Baden the inhabitants changed to Lutheranism.

During the Napoleonic wars Ispringen suffered quartering by French, Prussian, Cossack and German troops. This was the town's first large scale exposure to outside influences.

Following the end of the Second World War Ispringen experienced something of a boom. Pforzheim had been reduced to rubble in an Allied bombing raid late in the war, and Ispringen had been largely unaffected. Some light industrial businesses started building along the south side of town. This was followed by young families in the fifties and sixties looking for both employment and space outside but still close to their old place of habitation.

== Geography ==
As the source of the Kämpfelbach, Ispringen sits at the head of a shallow river valley. At the extreme eastern end of the town what flat land is available is monopolised by the Karlsruhe to Pforzheim rail link and the L570 road link. For most of the length of the town the valley floor is no wider than a hundred metres across, until the western boundary is reached and the valley opens out into fields more typical of Ispringen's downstream neighbours. As such most of the town is built on the relatively shallow but steep sides of the upper valley, and any short walk away from the centre of town will quickly allow a view of a majority of the locality.

To the south of the town is a thin isthmus of forest and the A8 Munich to Karlsruhe autobahn that separates the town from Pforzheim's shopping district. These barriers are impassable by car. The result of which being that while Ispringen is close in physical proximity to its larger neighbour, it retains a distinct identity of its own and cannot be regarded at a suburb of that city. Beyond Pforzheim the Black Forest begins.

Over the north side of the valley the countryside opens to a large plain of rolling hills and large commercial farms.

== Education ==
At kindergarten Ispringen has four establishments, two of each run by the Lutheran and Catholic churches, both denominations having one on either side of the valley.

Primary school level education was formerly provided at the old school house located on the corner of Schulstraße and Gartenstraße, now occupied by the local branch of the Sparkasse. Due to demographic pressure it was necessary to build a larger school and this now located on the southside of town on a wooded promontory between to industrial zone and the larger Ersingen town forest.

Secondary school education is also provided for at this facility, but is limited to Hauptschule and Werkrealschule levels. Those Isprigen residents who wish to take the more academic oriented gymnasium stream have the option of five such schools in Pforzheim or one further down the valley at Königsbach.

== Religion ==
Ispringen is serviced by four churches. The town's established Lutheran church, dating from the late eighteenth century, lies on the Hochstraße. On the south side of town the small Catholic and non-conformist Christian communities are served by the Maria Königen church on Höhenstraße and the Neueapostolik church respectively. Mass is not celebrated every Sunday at Maria Königen, but services are available in the predominantly Catholic village of Ersingen a few kilometres to the west. There is a secondary smaller Lutheran church. No non-Christian religion has established a house of worship in the town. Missing is the Evangelishe Kirche which our family belonged to??

== Notable people ==
- August Kautz, Union Army cavalry officer during the American Civil War
- Dieter Kosslick, director of the Berlin International Film Festival
