= Wade Hampton III =

American soldier and politician (1818–1902)

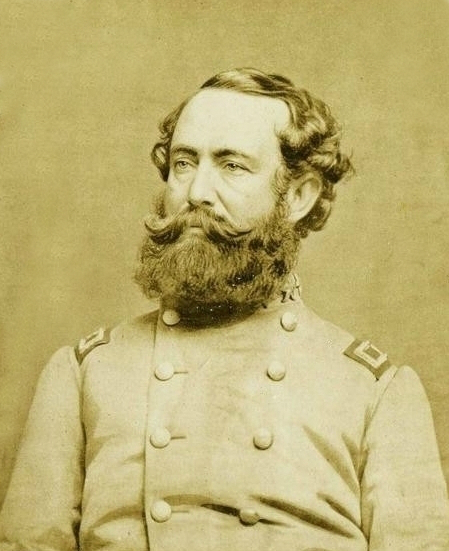
- Wade Hampton during the Civil War

United States Senator from South Carolina
- In office March 4, 1879 – March 3, 1891
- Preceded by: John J. Patterson
- Succeeded by: John L. M. Irby

77th Governor of South Carolina
- In office April 11, (Note: Declared sole governor of South Carolina) 1877 – February 26, 1879
- Lieutenant: William Dunlap Simpson
- Preceded by: Daniel Henry Chamberlain
- Succeeded by: William Dunlap Simpson
- In office December 14, 1876 – April 11, 1877; Disputed with Daniel Chamberlain (Note: After the Compromise of 1877 and the removal of federal troops from the South, Democrats began disenfranchising African Americans. Chamberlain claimed that the 1876 South Carolina gubernatorial election results were invalid because of this enfranchisement, refusing to leave office. Two governments were formed during this time.)

Member of the South Carolina Senate from Richland County
- In office November 22, 1858 – October 8, 1861
- Preceded by: John Smith Preston
- Succeeded by: Edward John Arthur

Member of the South Carolina House of Representatives from Richland County
- In office November 22, 1852 – November 22, 1858

Personal details
- Born: March 28, 1818 Charleston, South Carolina, U.S.
- Died: April 11, 1902 (aged 84) Columbia, South Carolina, U.S.
- Resting place: Trinity Cathedral Churchyard
- Party: Democratic
- Relations: Wade Hampton I (grandfather)
- Parent(s): Wade Hampton II; Ann Fitzsimmons
- Education: South Carolina College
- Profession: planter, soldier, politician
- Committees: United States railroad commissioner 1893–1897

Military service
- Allegiance: Confederate States
- Branch/service: Confederate States Army
- Years of service: 1861–1865
- Rank: Lieutenant General
- Commands: Hampton's Legion; Cavalry Corps, Army of Northern Virginia
- Battles/wars: See battles: American Civil War; First Battle of Bull Run (WIA); Peninsula Campaign; Siege of Yorktown; Battle of Eltham's Landing; Battle of Seven Pines (WIA); Seven Days Battles; Battle of White Oak Swamp; Maryland Campaign; Battle of Antietam; Raid on Chambersburg; Gettysburg campaign; Battle of Brandy Station (WIA); Battle of Upperville; Battle of Fairfax Court House; Battle of Hanover; Battle of Hunterstown (WIA); Battle of Gettysburg (WIA); Overland Campaign; Battle of the Wilderness; Battle of Todd's Tavern; Battle of Spotsylvania; Battle of North Anna; Battle of Haw's Shop; Battle of Cold Harbor; Battle of Trevilian Station; Battle of Saint Mary's Church; Siege of Petersburg; Battle of Sappony Church; Second Battle of Ream's Station; Beefsteak Raid; Battle of Vaughan Road; Battle of Boydton Plank Road; Carolinas Campaign; Capture of Columbia; Battle of Monroe's Cross Roads; Battle of Bentonville; Battle of Morrisville

Wade Hampton III (March 28, 1818 – April 11, 1902) was an American politician from South Carolina. He was a prominent member of one of the richest families in the antebellum Southern United States, owning thousands of acres of cotton land in South Carolina and Mississippi, as well as thousands of slaves. He became a senior general in the Confederate Army of Northern Virginia during the American Civil War. He also had a career as a leading Democratic Party politician in state and national affairs.

By 1877, at the end of the Reconstruction era, Hampton was a leader of the Redeemers, white Southerners who successfully fought to restore white supremacy in the state. His campaign for governor was marked by extensive violence by the Red Shirts, a white-supremacist paramilitary group that disrupted elections and suppressed black voters in the state. Hampton was elected governor, serving from 1876 to 1879. After that, he served two terms as U.S. Senator from 1879 to 1891.

== Early life and career ==
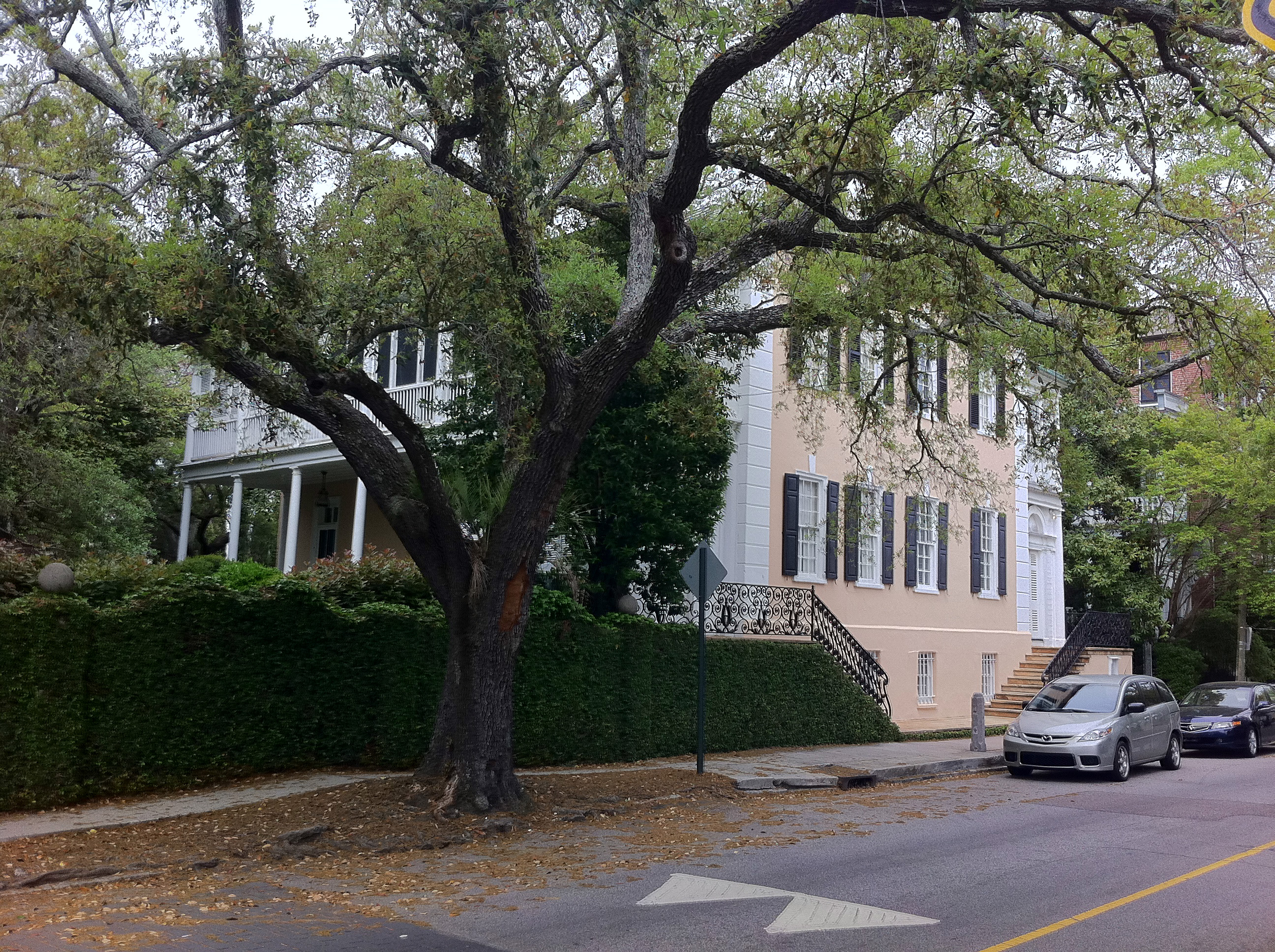
The Col. William Rhett House, 54 Hasell St., Charleston, South Carolina, the birthplace of Wade Hampton III

Wade Hampton III was born in 1818 at 54 Hasell St. in Charleston, South Carolina, the eldest son of "Colonel" Wade Hampton II (1791–1858) and Ann (née Fitzsimmons) Hampton. His mother was from a wealthy family in Charleston. After the War of 1812, his father built a fortune on land speculation in the Southern states.

The senior Hampton was an officer of dragoons in the War of 1812 and an aide to General Andrew Jackson at the Battle of New Orleans. The boy was the grandson of Wade Hampton (1754–1835), lieutenant colonel of cavalry in the American War of Independence, member of the U.S. House of Representatives, and brigadier general in the War of 1812. Wade III's uncle by marriage, James Henry Hammond, was elected to the U.S. House of Representatives, Governor of South Carolina and, in the late 1850s, elected to the United States Senate.

Wade Hampton III grew up in a wealthy planter family, receiving private instruction. He had four younger sisters. His was an active outdoor life; he rode horses and hunted, especially at his family's North Carolina summer retreat, High Hampton. All of his life he took hunting trips alone into the woods, hunting American black bears with only a pack of hounds and a knife.

In 1836, Hampton graduated from South Carolina College (now the University of South Carolina) and was trained for the law, although he never practiced. His father assigned certain plantations to him to manage in South Carolina and Mississippi. The younger man also became active in Democratic state politics.

He was elected to the South Carolina General Assembly in 1852 and was a state senator from 1858 to 1861. After Hampton's father died in 1858, he inherited a vast fortune, plantations, and enslaved people.

== Civil War ==
During the Civil War, Hampton served in the Confederate army, resigning from the South Carolina Senate to enlist as a private in the South Carolina Militia. The governor of South Carolina insisted that Hampton accept a colonel's commission.

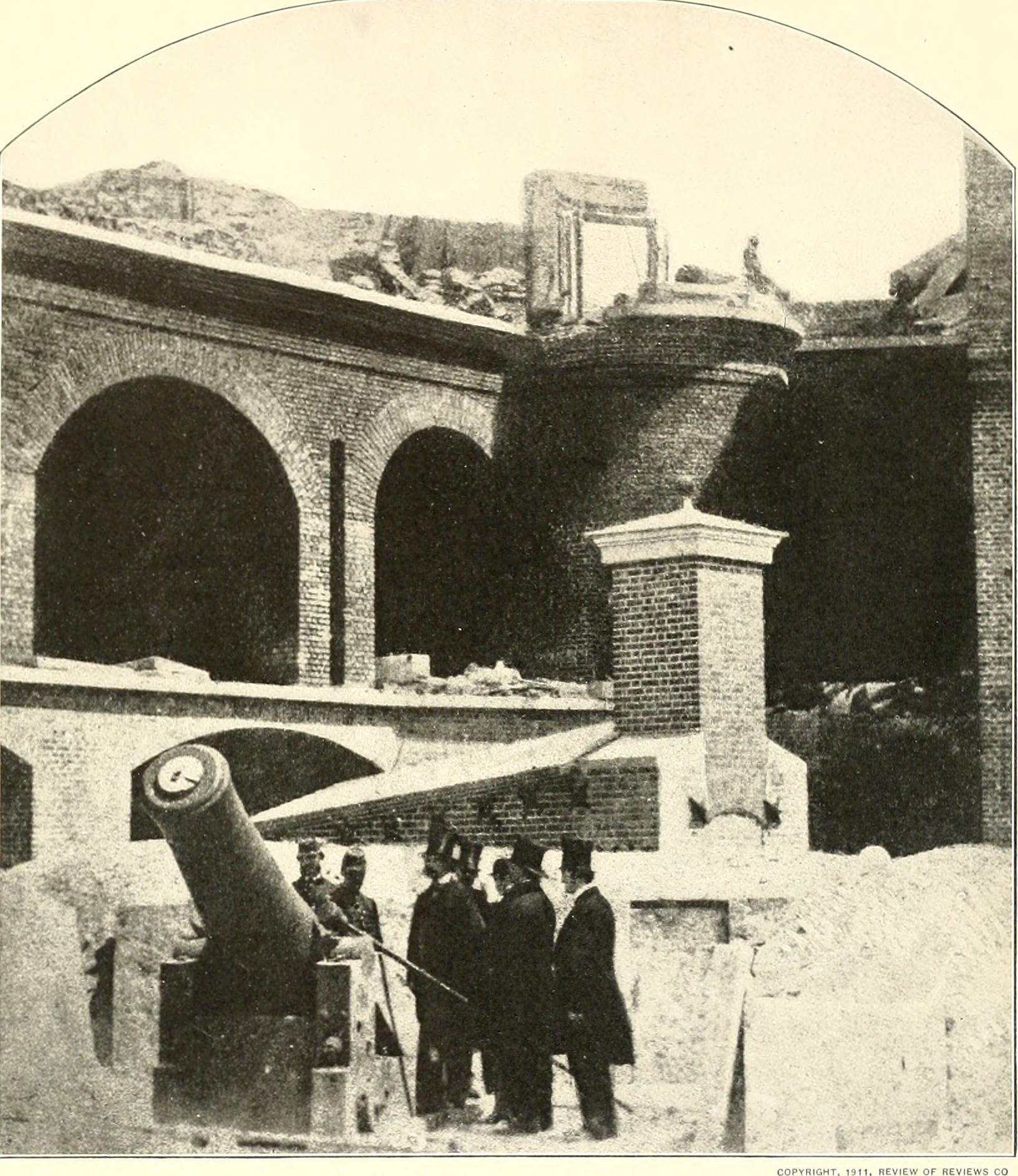
Wade Hampton and other leading South Carolinians inspecting the interiors of Fort Sumter, April 10, 1861

Although he had no military experience, his years of managing plantations and serving in state government were considered signs of leadership. Furthermore wealthy men were commissioned based on social standing and expected to finance military units. Hampton organized "Hampton's Legion", which consisted of six companies of infantry, four companies of cavalry, and one battery of artillery. He paid for all the weapons for the unit. Hampton proved a natural cavalryman—brave, audacious, and a superb horseman. Of officers without previous military experience, he was one of three to achieve the rank of Lieutenant General, the others being Nathan Bedford Forrest and Richard Taylor.

Hampton's first combat came at the First Battle of Bull Run, where he deployed his unit at a decisive moment, reinforcing a Confederate line that was retreating from Buck Hill, giving the brigade of Thomas J. Jackson the time to reach the field and make a defensive stand. A bullet creased Hampton's forehead when he led a charge against a U.S. artillery position. It was the first of five wounds he would receive during the war.

=== Peninsula Campaign ===
During the winter of 1861–62, Hampton's Legion was assigned to the command of Gustavus W. Smith. Smith's division accompanied the rest of Joseph E. Johnston's Army of Northern Virginia down the Virginia Peninsula to aid in the Siege of Yorktown (1862) before Johnston withdrew to Richmond. On May 23, 1862, Hampton was promoted to Brigadier General. At the Battle of Seven Pines on May 31, 1862, he was severely wounded in the foot, but while still under fire, he remained on his horse while the bullet was removed and the foot was treated. Hampton returned to duty in time to fill in as leader of an infantry brigade for Stonewall Jackson at the end of the Seven Days Battles, although the brigade was not significantly engaged.

=== Maryland Campaign ===
After the Peninsula Campaign, General Robert E. Lee reorganized his cavalry forces as a division under the command of Major General J.E.B. Stuart, who selected Hampton as his senior subordinate to command one of two cavalry brigades. Hampton's brigade was left in Richmond to observe McClellan's withdrawal from the Peninsula, while the rest of the army participated in the Northern Virginia Campaign. Thus, Hampton and his men missed the Second Battle of Bull Run, re-joining the army shortly thereafter; but were present on the extreme left of the Confederate line at Antietam. His brigade was selected to participate in Stuart's Chambersburg Raid in October 1862, in which Hampton was briefly appointed "military governor" of the town following its surrender to the Confederate cavalry. During the winter of 1862, Hampton led a series of cavalry raids behind enemy lines and captured numerous prisoners and supplies without casualties, earning a commendation from General Lee. In November 1862, he captured 137 men of the 3rd Pennsylvania Cavalry at Hartwood Presbyterian Church.

Hampton was not present at the Battle of Fredericksburg or the Battle of Chancellorsville due to being detached for raids elsewhere.

=== Stuart's Christmas Raid ===
Hampton's brigade would play a role in the December 27–29, 1862 Christmas Raids of Union supply depots in Virginia.

=== Gettysburg Campaign ===
At the Battle of Brandy Station, the war's largest predominantly cavalry battle, Hampton was slightly wounded, and his younger brother Frank was killed. Immediately thereafter, Hampton's brigade participated in Stuart's raid in Pennsylvania, swinging around the U.S. army and losing contact with Lee. While attempting to reunite with Lee, Hampton engaged in cavalry battles at Upperville, Fairfax Court House, and Hanover.

Stuart and Hampton reached the vicinity of Gettysburg, Pennsylvania, late on July 2, 1863. While just outside town protecting the Confederate's flank, Hampton was confronted by a U.S. cavalryman pointing a rifle at him from 200 yards. Hampton charged the soldier before he could fire his rifle, but another soldier blindsided Hampton with a saber cut to the back of his head. Hampton's Legion fought the U.S. Cavalry under the command of George Armstrong Custer all evening, resulting in a draw at the Battle of Hunterstown.

On July 3, Hampton led the cavalry attack east of Gettysburg at the same time as Pickett's Charge, attempting to disrupt the U.S. rear, but collided with Custer's cavalry. He received two more saber cuts to the front of his head but continued fighting until he was again wounded with shrapnel to the hip. Colonel Laurence S. Baker assumed command of Hampton's Brigade after the injury. Hampton was carried back to Virginia in the same ambulance as John Bell Hood.

On August 3, 1863, Hampton was promoted to Major General and received command of a cavalry division. His wounds from Gettysburg were slow to heal, so he did not return to duty until November.

=== Overland Campaign ===
During the Overland Campaign of 1864, Hampton's cavalry fought at the Battle of Todd's Tavern during the Battle of the Wilderness. It patrolled the left flank of the Confederate position at the Battle of Spotsylvania Court House, during which time J.E.B. Stuart was killed at the Battle of Yellow Tavern. Hampton escorted Lee's withdrawal to Richmond, fighting at the Battle of North Anna and the Battle of Haw's Shop before being detached from Lee's army to deal with Maj. Gen. Philip Sheridan's cavalry destroying central Virginia's railroad. He distinguished himself further with a victory at the Battle of Trevilian Station, the war's largest all-cavalry battle. After his return to Richmond, he fought at the Battle of Saint Mary's Church and was given command of the Cavalry Corps by Robert E. Lee on August 11, 1864. For the rest of the war, Hampton lost no cavalry battles.

=== Petersburg ===
In September 1864, during the Siege of Petersburg, Hampton conducted what became known as the "Beefsteak Raid", where his troopers captured over 2,400 head of cattle and more than 300 prisoners behind enemy lines. He successfully led the cavalry through battles at Sappony Church, Ream's Station, and Vaughan Road. In October, during the Battle of Boydton Plank Road, Hampton sent his son, T. Preston Hampton, a lieutenant serving as one of his aides, to deliver a message. Shortly afterward, Hampton and his other son, Wade IV, rode in the same direction. Before traveling 200 yards (180 m), they came across Preston lying on the ground; he was fatally wounded and soon died. As young Wade dismounted, he was also shot but survived.

=== Carolinas Campaign ===
While Lee's army was bottled up in Petersburg, Virginia in January 1865, Hampton returned to South Carolina via train to recruit soldiers and cut off William Tecumseh Sherman's march through the Carolinas. He was promoted to Lieutenant General on February 14, 1865, effective the morning of the 17th. Later that evening, during the Capture of Columbia, Hampton and his forces would flee the state capital as Sherman's forces entered the city. Much of Columbia was burned to the ground, including Hampton's childhood home, Millwood Plantation. Hampton's cavalry rode north to engage with U.S. Brig. Gen. Judson Kilpatrick's (often called "Kill-Cavalry") cavalry at Monroe's Crossroads and Morrisville.

Hampton drew up plans for the Battle of Bentonville, but eventually General Joseph E. Johnston surrendered the Army of Tennessee at Bennett Place in Durham, North Carolina. Hampton refused to surrender and nearly got into a personal fight with U.S. Brig. Gen. Judson Kilpatrick at the Bennett Farm. Hampton did not officially submit to federal authorities until May 15, 1865, nearly three weeks after the events at Bennett Place.

== Postwar years ==
Together with Lt. Gen. Jubal A. Early, Hampton became a proponent of the Lost Cause of the Confederacy movement. He worked to justify the Confederacy's loss and lamented the loss of his wealthy antebellum life. He embraced the negationist belief that slavery as practiced in the American South was benign and that black people were racially inferior to white people, but that upper-class whites like himself should act in paternalistic fashion. Hampton resented the U.S. government's use of United States Colored Troops in occupying forces in South Carolina.

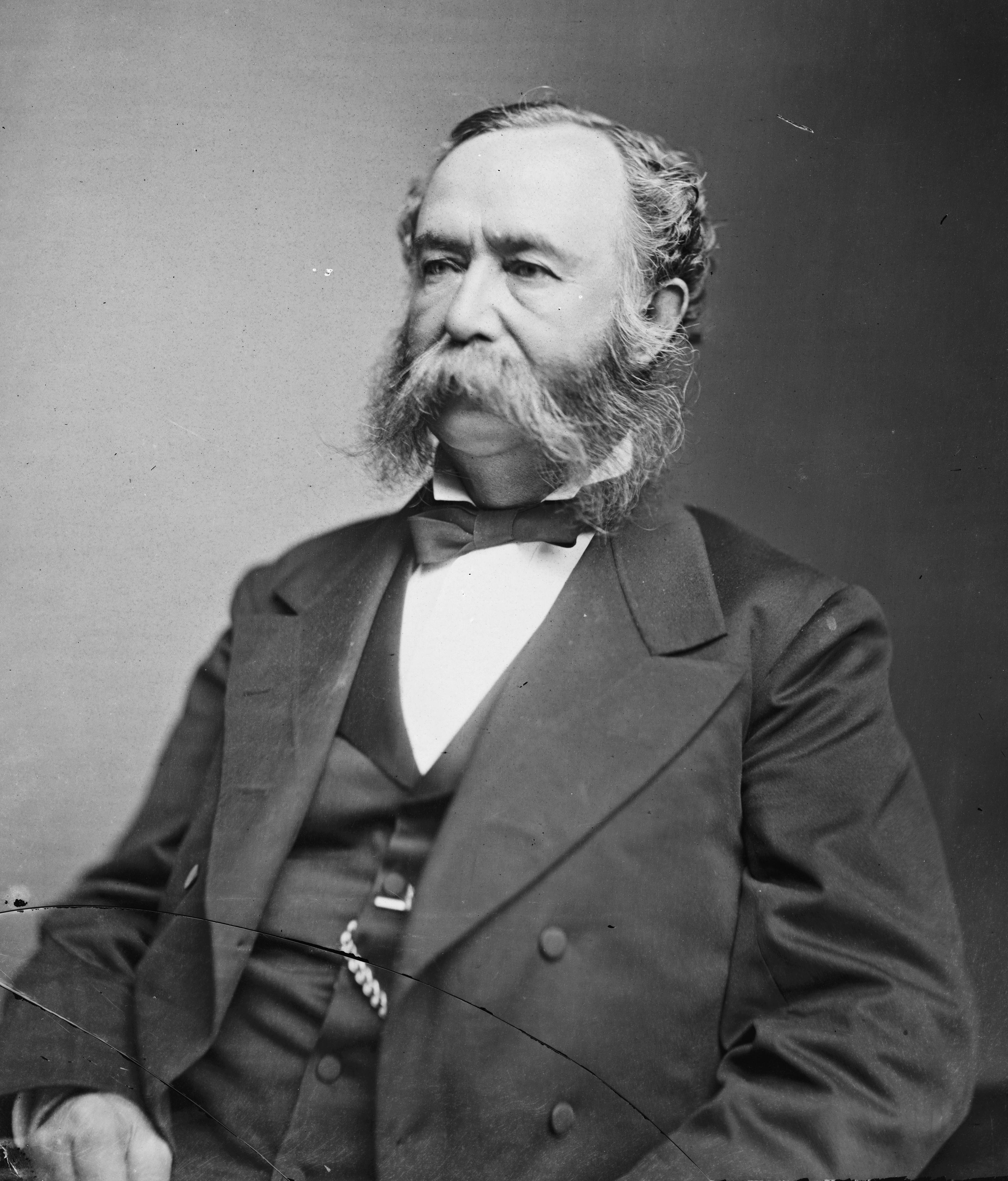
Senator Wade Hampton

Hampton was offered the nomination for governor in 1865, but he refused because he believed that Northerners would naturally be suspicious of a former Confederate general seeking political office only months after the end of the Civil War. Hampton campaigned to ask supporters not to vote for him in the gubernatorial election. In 1868, he became the chair of the South Carolina Democratic Party central committee. That year, the Radical Republicans won the election.

Hampton essentially ceased most overt political activity until 1876. He helped raise money for legal defense funds after the U.S. government began enforcing anti-Klan legislation of 1870 and 1871 to suppress the Ku Klux Klan's violence against freedmen and white Republicans. He was not active in the Klan. Hampton supported Matthew Calbraith Butler in the Union Reform campaign of 1870.

=== Redeemers recapture South Carolina ===
Other insurgent groups rapidly formed to compound the KKK. In South Carolina and other states, groups of men calling themselves "rifle clubs" formed to act as vigilantes in the years after the war. In 1876, an estimated 20,000 men in South Carolina were members of rifle clubs. Political campaigns were increasingly violent, with whites trying to suppress black voting.

Beginning in the mid-1870s, the white-supremacist paramilitary group known as the Red Shirts developed chapters in most South Carolina counties. These groups acted as "the military arm of the Democratic Party." They marched in parades during campaigns, openly disrupted Republican meetings, and worked to suppress black voting in the state by violence and intimidation.

Hampton opposed the Radical Republicans' Reconstruction-era policies in the Southern United States, especially African Americans being allowed to vote and participate in politics. He re-entered South Carolina politics in 1876, running in opposition to those policies. Hampton, a Democrat, ran against the Republican incumbent governor Daniel Henry Chamberlain. After helping to secure a pardon for Martin Delany, an African American who had been the Independent Republican nominee for lieutenant governor in 1874, he was able to obtain Delany's endorsement for the governorship. The 1876 South Carolina gubernatorial election was the bloodiest in the state's history. The Red Shirts used violence in every county to suppress black voters. "An anti-Reconstruction historian later estimated that 150 Negroes were murdered in South Carolina during the campaign." Although it seems clear that supporters of Hampton included Red Shirts, prominent Hampton biographer Rod Andrew asserted that there was "no evidence that Hampton himself supported or encouraged that violence." Indeed, Benjamin Tillman, the undisputed leader of the Red Shirts, would be instrumental in removing Hampton from his Senate seat in 1890.

Both parties claimed victory. For more than six months, two legislatures in the state claimed to be authentic. Eventually, the South Carolina Supreme Court ruled that Hampton won the election, the first Democratic governor in South Carolina since the end of the Civil War. The national election of Rutherford B. Hayes as President of the United States was settled by a compromise among Democrats, by which the national party agreed to end the Reconstruction era formally. In 1877, Hayes ordered the withdrawal of U.S. troops from the Southern United States, essentially leaving whites to reassert control over freedmen.

After the election, Hampton became known as the "Savior of South Carolina"; he was one of those Democrats elected who were called "Redeemers." He was re-elected in 1878; the Red Shirts gave support, but less violence was required.

Hampton was thrown from a mule while deer hunting two days later and broke his right leg. Several weeks later, his right leg was amputated due to complications from the injury. Despite refusing to announce his candidacy for the Senate, Hampton was elected to the U.S. Senate by the South Carolina General Assembly on the same day that his leg was amputated. He resigned from the governorship to enter the Senate, serving two terms until 1891. He was a conservative Bourbon Democrat who appealed to some freedmen in support of his win.

== Later years ==
From 1893 to 1897, Hampton served as United States Railroad Commissioner, appointed by President Grover Cleveland.

He was a hereditary member of the South Carolina Society of the Cincinnati.

== Personal life ==
In 1838, Hampton married Margaret Preston (1818–1852). Their children were: Wade Hampton IV (1840–1879), Thomas Preston Hampton (1843–1864, killed in the war), Sarah Buchanan Hampton (1845–1886), John Preston Hampton (1846–1847), and Harriet Flud Hampton (1848–1853).

In 1858, Hampton III married Mary Singleton McDuffie (1830–1874). Their children were: George McDuffie Hampton (1859–1917), Mary Singleton "Daisy" Hampton (1861–1934), Alfred Hampton (1863–1942), and Catherine Fisher Hampton (born and died 1867)

Wade Hampton died in Columbia in 1902. He was buried in Trinity Cathedral Churchyard.

== Legacy ==
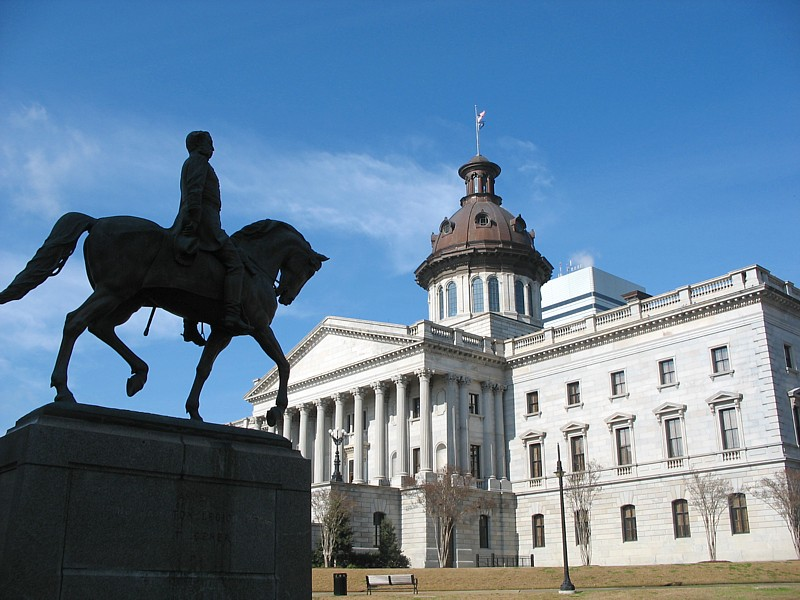
Statue of Wade Hampton at South Carolina State House

Statues of him were erected in the South Carolina State House building and the United States Capitol. An equestrian statue by Frederick W. Ruckstull was erected on the grounds of the S.C. state capitol in Columbia, in 1906.

In the wake of the June 17, 2015, massacre at the Charleston Emanuel African Methodist Episcopal Church by white supremacist Dylann Roof, there was a push to remove Confederate symbols in the United States Capitol, including the Hampton statue. Congressional representatives voted to retain the statues.

To honor Hampton for his leadership in the Civil War and the "redemption" of the state from Reconstruction-era reforms, the General Assembly created Hampton County from Beaufort County in 1878. The town of Hampton Courthouse, later shortened to Hampton, was incorporated on December 23, 1879, to serve as the county seat of Hampton County.

Across South Carolina, many towns and cities renamed streets for him. At least eight municipalities in South Carolina have a street named "Wade Hampton" (Beaufort, Charleston, Duncan, Greenville, Greer, Hampton, Taylors, and Walterboro) and approximately 47 towns in the state have streets named "Hampton". Two high schools in South Carolina are named Wade Hampton High School: in Greenville and in Varnville. A residence hall at Hampton's alma mater, the University of South Carolina, was named for him. In July 2021, the university's Presidential Commission on University History recommended removing his name from the building.

A Hampton Park was dedicated in Charleston and another in Columbia in his honor. The historic Hampton Heights neighborhood in Spartanburg is named after him. In 1964, Wade Hampton Academy was started in Orangeburg, considered a segregation academy. The school merged with Willington Academy in 1986 to become Orangeburg Preparatory Schools, Inc.

In 1913, Judge John Randolph Tucker named the Wade Hampton Census Area in Alaska to commemorate his father-in-law (it was renamed Kusilvak Census Area in 2015 to remove the blemish of having a place named for a slave-holding Confederate general).

An artillery battery was named after Wade Hampton at Fort Crockett, built on Galveston Island, Texas. The Wade Hampton Battery was one of four coastal artillery batteries and contained two 10-inch guns. During World War II, the SS Wade Hampton, a Liberty ship named in honor of the general, was sunk off the coast of Greenland by a German U-boat.

In Greenville County, South Carolina, the section of U.S. Route 29 that connects the city of Greenville to Spartanburg is called Wade Hampton Boulevard. There is also a fire district (Wade Hampton Fire Department) named in his honor placed on the east side of Greenville, adjoining the Greenville city limits, which include Wade Hampton High School.

The Sons of Confederate Veterans awarded Hampton with its Confederate Medal of Honor, created in 1977.

== In fiction ==
In Margaret Mitchell's novel Gone with the Wind, Scarlett O'Hara's first husband, Charles Hamilton, serves in Hampton's regiment. As it was fashionable (according to Mitchell) to name baby boys after their fathers' commanding officers, Scarlett's son by Charles is named Wade Hampton Hamilton. In the film version of Gone With The Wind, there is no mention of the marriage producing a son but the letter sent to Scarlett advising her of Charles's death is shown to be signed by Hampton.

In the North and South trilogy by John Jakes, the character Charles Main serves with Hampton's cavalry throughout the Civil War.

Hampton appears in a small role in How Few Remain, the first novel in Harry Turtledove's Southern Victory Series, an alternate history in which the South wins the American Civil War. Later in the series, in the novel American Empire: Blood and Iron, Hampton's fictional grandson Wade Hampton V appears as President of the Confederate States, who is assassinated in the first few months of his term by a Freedom Party stalwart.

Hampton is mentioned in Chapter 14, Section V of Go Set a Watchman by Harper Lee, when Jean Louise's Uncle Jack is trying to get her to understand her father Atticus's actions regarding the citizens' committee after the Brown v. Board of Education decision.

The 2021 independent film Hampton's Legion presents details of Hampton's military activity during the American Civil War.

== See also ==
- List of American Civil War generals (Confederate)
- List of big-game hunters

== Literature ==
- Ackerman, Robert K. Wade Hampton III. Columbia: University of South Carolina Press, 2007. ISBN 978-1-57003-667-5.
- Andrew, Rod Jr. Wade Hampton: Confederate Warrior to Southern Redeemer ( University of North Carolina Press, 2008)
- Eicher, John H., and David J. Eicher, Civil War High Commands. Stanford: Stanford University Press, 2001. ISBN 978-0-8047-3641-1.
- Jarrell, Hampton M. Wade Hampton and the Negro: The Road Not Taken. Columbia: University of South Carolina Press, 1969. OCLC 2774253.
- Hamer, Fritz. "Wade Hampton: Conflicted Leader of the Conservative Democracy?" Proceedings of the South Carolina Historical Association (2007) pp. 27–40.
- Sifakis, Stewart. Who Was Who in the Civil War. New York: Facts On File, 1988. ISBN 978-0-8160-1055-4.
- Tagg, Larry. The Generals of Gettysburg, Campbell, CA: Savas Publishing, 1998. ISBN 1-882810-30-9.
- Warner, Ezra J. (1959). Generals in Gray: Lives of the Confederate Commanders (1st ed.). Baton Rouge: Louisiana State University Press. OCLC 445052.
- Wells, Edward L. Hampton and Reconstruction. Columbia, SC: The State Co., 1907. OCLC 2339541.

Party political offices
Vacant Title last held by William D. Porter	Democratic nominee for Governor of South Carolina; 1876, 1878	Succeeded by Johnson Hagood
Political offices
Preceded by Daniel Henry Chamberlain	Governor of South Carolina; 1877–1879	Succeeded by William Dunlap Simpson
U.S. Senate
Preceded by John J. Patterson	U.S. senator (Class 3) from South Carolina; 1879–1891; Served alongside: Matthew C. Butler	Succeeded by John L. M. Irby
