= First Battle of Ream's Station =

Battle of the American Civil War

Coordinates: 37.0959°N 77.4226°W

- Part of the American Civil War
- A map of the Union raiders' route
Date	June 29, 1864
Location	Dinwiddie County, Virginia
Result	Confederate victory

Belligerents
United States	(Confederate States of America) Confederate States

Commanders and leaders
James H. Wilson; August Kautz	William Mahone; Fitzhugh Lee

Strength
4,000	7,000

Casualties and losses
- 600

The First Battle of Ream's Station was fought on June 29, 1864, during the Wilson–Kautz Raid of the American Civil War. Confederate forces under Maj. Gen. William Mahone and Brig. Gen. Fitzhugh Lee defeated Union cavalry raiding Confederate railroads south of Petersburg, Virginia.

== Background ==
In June 1864, a Union division under the command of Brig. Gen. August V. Kautz moved into southern Virginia where they began destroying sections of the Wilmington and Weldon Railroad as part of the Richmond-Petersburg Campaign. On June 29 the division reached Ream's Station south of Petersburg on the Weldon Railroad, which was thought to be held by Union infantry. Instead, Kautz found the road barred by Mahone's Confederate infantry division. Wilson's division, fighting against elements of Maj. Gen. W.H.F. "Rooney" Lee's cavalry, joined Kautz's near Ream's Station, where they were virtually surrounded.

== Battle ==
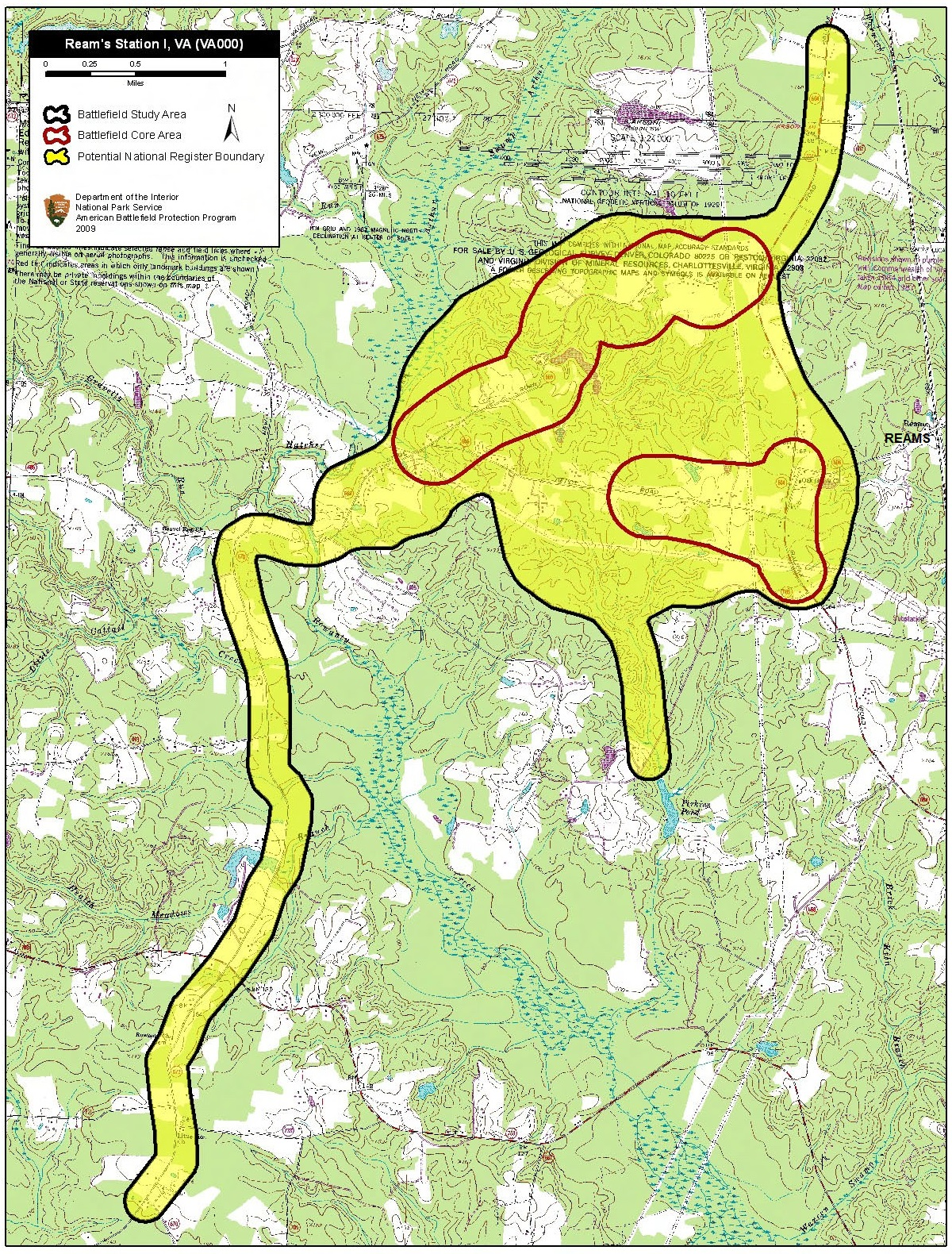
Map of Ream's Station Battlefield core and study areas by the American Battlefield Protection Program.

Around noon, Mahone led Confederate infantry against the Union front while cavalry under Fitzhugh Lee attacked the Union left flank. The fierce assault split the Union forces. Wilson and Kautz were forced to withdraw quickly, burning their supply wagons and abandoning their artillery.

Separated by the Confederate attacks, Wilson and his men cut their way through and retreated southwest on the Stage Road to cross the Nottoway River, while Kautz headed south and east cross-country, reaching Federal lines at Petersburg about dark. Wilson continued east to the Blackwater River before turning north, eventually reaching Union lines at Light House Point on July 2.

The Wilson-Kautz raid tore up more than 60 miles (97 km) of track, temporarily disrupting rail traffic into Petersburg, but at a great cost in men and mounts.

== Battlefield preservation ==
The American Battlefield Trust and its partners have acquired and preserved 293 acres (1.19 km^{2}) of the fields of battle at Ream's Station through November 2021.

== See also ==
- Second Battle of Ream's Station
- Battles of the American Civil War
- Bibliography of Ulysses S. Grant
- Bibliography of the American Civil War
