= Second Battle of Ream's Station =

Battle of the American Civil War

Coordinates: 37.0959°N 77.4226°W

- Part of the American Civil War
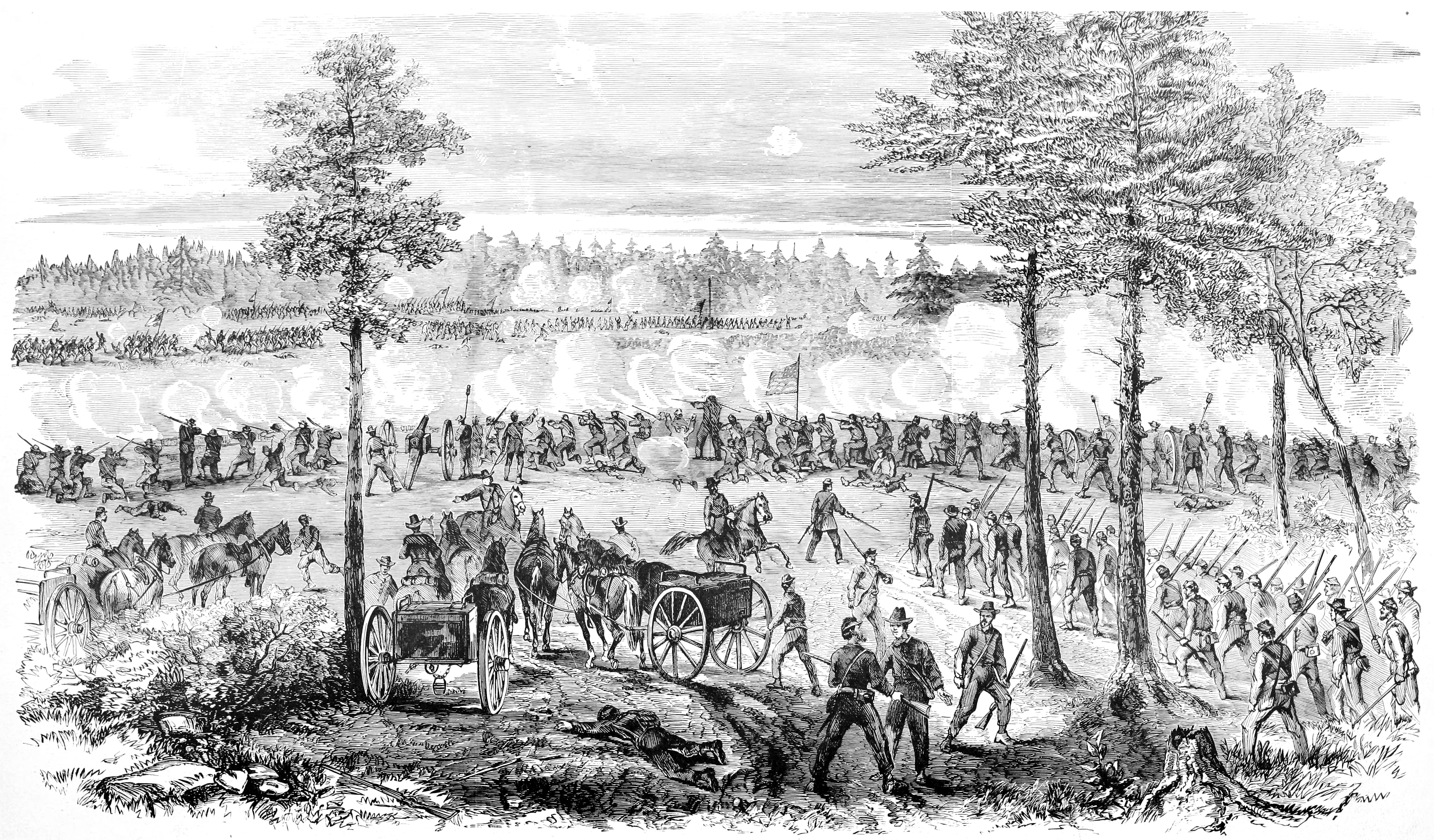
- Contemporary engraving showing the final repulse of the Confederate assault
| Date | August 25, 1864 |
| Location | Dinwiddie County, Virginia |
| Result | See aftermath |

Belligerents
| United States (Union) | (Confederate States of America) CSA (Confederacy) |

Commanders and leaders
| Winfield S. Hancock | A. P. Hill; Henry Heth |

Strength
| 9,000 | 8,000–10,000 |

Casualties and losses
| 2,747 (Killed 140; Wounded 529; Captured 2073) | 814 |

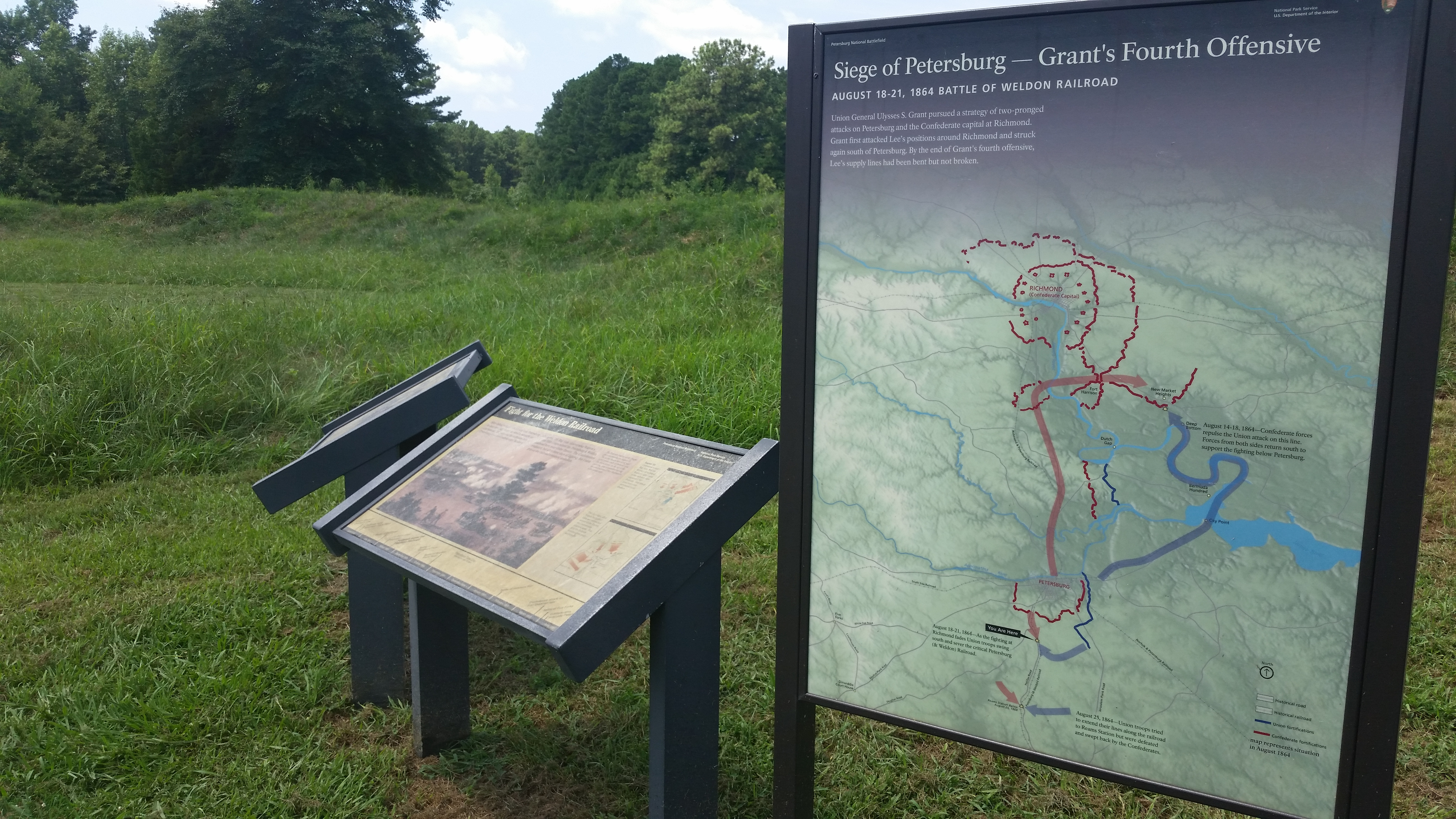
National Park Service marker at Fort Wadsworth

The Second Battle of Ream's Station (also Reams or Reams's) was fought during the siege of Petersburg in the American Civil War on August 25, 1864, in Dinwiddie County, Virginia. A Union force under Maj. Gen. Winfield S. Hancock began destroying part of the Petersburg Railroad, which was a vital supply line for Gen. Robert E. Lee's Confederate army in Petersburg, Virginia. Lee sent a force under Lt. Gen. A. P. Hill to challenge Hancock and the Confederates were able to rout the Union troops from their fortifications at Ream's Station. However, they lost a key portion of the railroad, causing further logistical difficulties for the remainder of the Richmond-Petersburg Campaign.

== Background ==
As the siege of Petersburg began to take hold, Union Lt. Gen. Ulysses S. Grant continued to look for ways to sever the railroad links supplying the city of Petersburg, Virginia, Confederate Gen. Robert E. Lee's army, and the Confederate capital of Richmond. One of these critical supply lines was the Petersburg Railroad, also called the Petersburg and Weldon Railroad, which led south to Weldon, North Carolina, and connected to the Wilmington and Weldon Railroad which led to the Confederacy's only remaining major port, Wilmington, North Carolina. In the Battle of Jerusalem Plank Road (June 21–23, 1864), Maj. Gen. Winfield S. Hancock's II Corps was able to destroy a short segment of the Weldon before being driven off by the Third Corps of Gen. Robert E. Lee's Army of Northern Virginia.

In the Battle of Globe Tavern (August 18–21), Maj. Gen. Gouverneur K. Warren's V Corps with reinforcements from the IX Corps destroyed miles of track and withstood strong attacks from Confederate troops under Gen. P.G.T. Beauregard and Lt. Gen. A.P. Hill. This Union victory forced the Confederates to carry their supplies 30 miles (48 km) by wagon to bypass the new Union lines that were extended farther to the south and west. However, this was not yet a critical problem for the Confederates. A member of Lee's staff wrote, "Whilst we are inconvenienced, no material harm is done us."

General Grant wanted the Petersburg Railroad closed permanently, destroying 14 miles (23 km) of track from Warren's position near Globe Tavern as far south as Rowanty Creek (about 3 miles (4.8 km) north of the town of Stony Creek). He assigned the operation to Hancock's II Corps, which was in the process of moving south from their operation north of the James River at the Second Battle of Deep Bottom. He chose Hancock's corps because Warren was busy extending the fortifications at Globe Tavern, although his selection was of troops exhausted from their efforts north of the James and their forced march south without rest; Hancock himself continued to suffer lingering effects from his wounds at the Battle of Gettysburg in 1863. Grant augmented Hancock's corps with the cavalry division of Brig. Gen. David McM. Gregg.

Gregg's division departed on August 22 and, after driving off Confederate pickets, they and the II Corps infantry division commanded by Brig. Gen. Nelson A. Miles (replacing Brig. Gen. Francis C. Barlow, who was on leave) destroyed the railroad tracks to within 2 miles (3.2 km) of Reams Station. Early on August 23, Hancock's other division, commanded by Brig. Gen. John Gibbon, occupied Reams Station, taking up positions in earthworks that had been constructed by the Union cavalry during the Wilson-Kautz Raid in June. The earthworks were constructed in a partial ellipse with an opening facing to the east, and although they had degraded and were partially filled with water, Hancock's men made little effort to improve them.

Robert E. Lee considered that the Union troops at Reams Station represented not only a threat to his supply line, but also to the county seat of Dinwiddie County; if Dinwiddie Court House were to fall, the Confederates would be forced to evacuate both Petersburg and Richmond because it represented a key point on the army's potential retreat route. He also saw an opportunity—that he could impose a stinging defeat on the Union Army not long before the presidential election in November. Lee ordered Lt. Gen. A.P. Hill to take the overall command of an expedition that included two cavalry divisions of Maj. Gen. Wade Hampton's cavalry, Maj. Gen. Cadmus M. Wilcox's division, part of Maj. Gen. Henry Heth's division, and part of Maj. Gen. William Mahone's division, about 8–10,000 men in all. Hill, who was suffering from one of his periodic bouts of illness, assigned Heth to tactical command, telling him he "must carry the position."

Hancock arrived personally at Reams Station on August 24 and by that evening the Union troops had destroyed track for 3 miles (4.8 km) south of the station. On the morning of August 25 they left their earthworks to start working on the remaining 5 miles (8.0 km) of track, but Hancock recalled them when he heard that Confederate cavalry was approaching.

== Battle ==
After the Confederate cavalry pushed back Gregg's cavalry, Hill's column advanced down the Dinwiddie Stage Road. Wilcox's three infantry brigades assaulted the Union position at about 2 p.m. on August 25. Despite launching two attacks, Wilcox was driven back by Miles's division, which was manning the northern part of the earthworks. To the south, Gibbon's division was blocking the advance of Hampton's cavalry, which had swept around the Union line.

While these two attacks were going on, Maj. Gen. George G. Meade, commander of the Army of the Potomac and in temporary overall command while Grant was ill, became concerned that Lee was attempting to turn the left flank of the Union army. Historian John Horn wrote that if Grant had been on the scene, he might have very well ordered an attack on Petersburg at this point, similar to the tactic he would use in April 1865 that caused the fall of the city, taking advantage of the weakly defended lines vacated by the heavy force that Lee had sent to Reams Station. Meade, however, cautiously assumed a defensive stance and rushed reinforcements to his flank, thinning his own lines. The only point that Meade did not reinforce was the sector commanded by his trusty subordinate Hancock, assuming that Hancock would hold the line with his existing resources.

Confederate reinforcements from Heth's and Mahone's divisions arrived while the Confederate artillery under Col. William Pegram softened up the Union position. The final attack began around 5:30 p.m. by six brigades against Miles's position and it broke through the northwest corner of the Union fortifications; although the Union defensive fire was fierce enough to keep the Confederates at bay, suddenly two Union regiments panicked and bolted for the rear, opening a gap. Miles ordered his reserve brigade under Col. Horace Rugg to close the gap, but to his astonishment, Rugg's men fell prone and refused to open fire. Heth personally led the charge through the earthworks, tussling with Sgt. Thomas Minton of the 26th North Carolina about who would carry the colors forward.

Hancock desperately galloped from one threatened point to the next, attempting to rally his men. At one point his horse dropped from under him and, assuming that it had been killed, Hancock proceeded on foot. The horse later jumped to its feet, having been temporarily paralyzed by a glancing blow to the spine, and Hancock remounted. He shouted, "We can beat them yet. Don't leave me, for God's sake!" As he witnessed the men of his once proud corps reluctant to retake their positions from the enemy, he remarked to a colonel, "I do not care to die, but I pray God I may never leave this field."

By this time, Hampton's cavalry was making progress against Gibbon's infantry to the south, launching a surprise dismounted attack that caused many of Gibbon's men to flee or surrender. This allowed Hampton to flank Miles. Hancock ordered a counterattack, which provided time to allow for an orderly Union withdrawal to Petersburg after dark.

== Aftermath ==
The agony of that day never died from that proud soldier [Hancock], who, for the first time, saw his lines broken and his guns taken.

— Col. Charles H. Morgan, Hancock's chief of staff

Union casualties were 2,747 (the II Corps lost 117 killed, 439 wounded, 2,046 missing/captured; the cavalry lost 145); Confederate casualties were 814 (Hampton's cavalry lost 16 killed, 75 wounded, 3 missing; Hill's infantry 720 total). Although the Confederates had won a clear victory, they had lost a vital piece of the Petersburg Railroad and from this point on they would be able to transport supplies by rail only as far north as Stony Creek Depot, 16 miles (26 km) south of Petersburg. From that point, supplies had to be unloaded and wagon trains would have to travel through Dinwiddie Court House and then on the Boydton Plank Road to get the supplies into Petersburg. The South Side Railroad was the only railroad left to supply Petersburg and Lee's army.

Grant and Meade were generally satisfied with the results of their operations against the Petersburg Railroad, despite the tactical setback suffered by Hancock. Meade wrote,

These frequent affairs are gradually thinning both armies, and if we can only manage to make the enemy lose more than we do, we will win in the long run, but unfortunately, the offensive being forced on us, causes us to seek battle on the enemy's terms, and our losses are accordingly the greatest, except when they come out and attack, as recently, when they always get the worst of it.

The siege of Petersburg and its trench warfare continued. The next major combat would be seen in late September as two Union attacks proceeded in parallel: at New Market Heights, north of the James (the Battle of Chaffin's Farm), and south at the Battle of Peebles' Farm, against the South Side Railroad.

== Battlefield preservation ==
The American Battlefield Trust and its partners have acquired and preserved 293 acres (1.19 km^{2}) of the battlegrounds at Ream's Station through late November 2021.

== See also ==
- First Battle of Ream's Station
