= Raid on Chambersburg =

Battle of the American Civil War

- Part of American Civil War
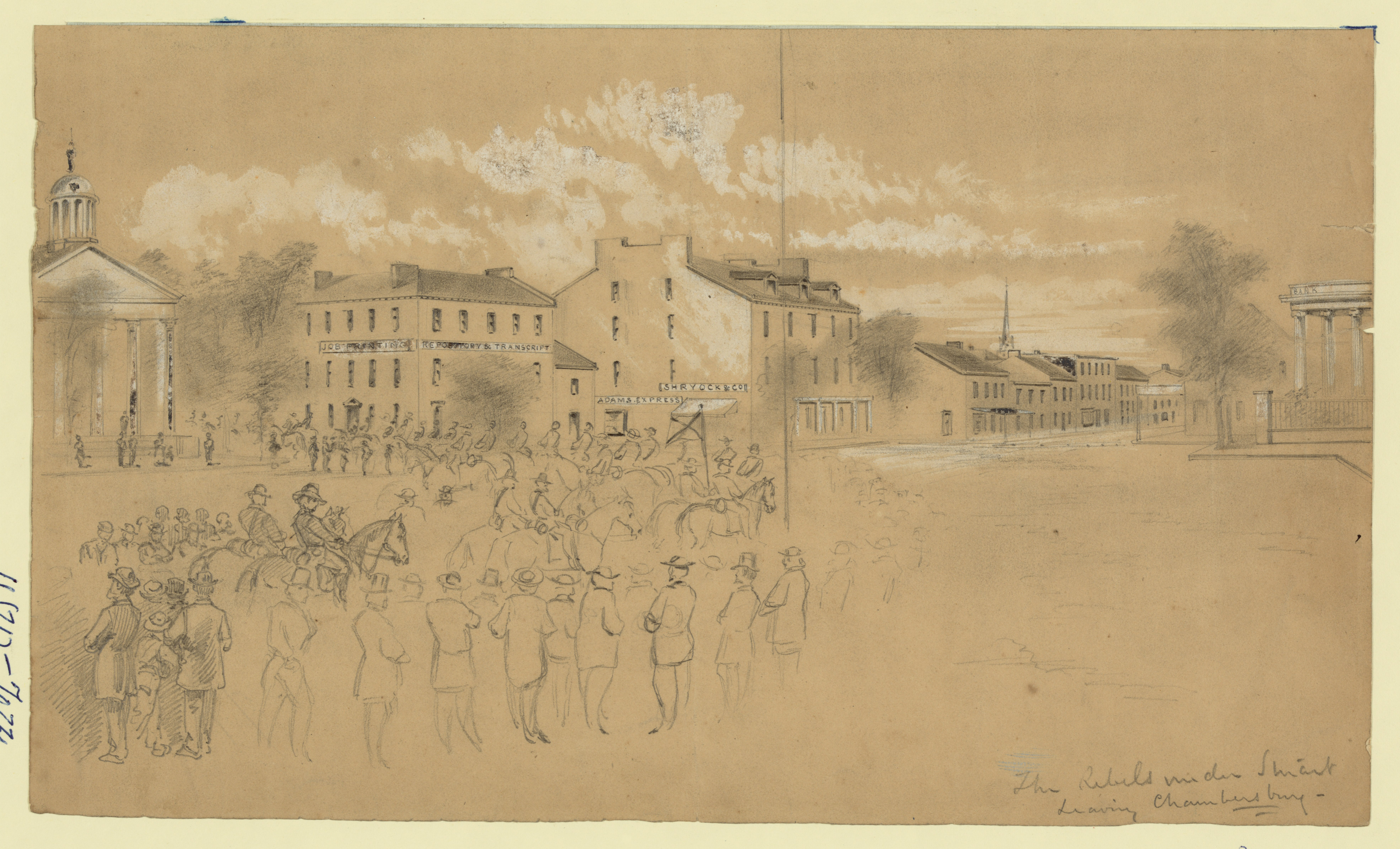
- The rebels under Stuart leaving Chambersburg, by John R. Chapin
Date	October 10, 1862 – October 12, 1862
Location	Western Maryland; South Central Pennsylvania
Result	Confederate victory

Belligerents
United States (Union)	(Confederate States of America) CSA (Confederacy)

Commanders and leaders
George B. McClellan; Alfred Pleasonton	J.E.B. Stuart

Strength
2,000+	1,800

Casualties and losses
280 captured and paroled	"A few" wounded 2 missing

The Raid on Chambersburg, often identified as J.E.B. Stuart's Chambersburg Raid, was a Confederate States Army cavalry raid into Maryland and Pennsylvania on October 10–12, 1862 during the American Civil War. It became known as Stuart's "second ride around McClellan" because it duplicated Stuart's reconnaissance ride completely around the Union Army of the Potomac under Major General George B. McClellan during the ill-fated Peninsula Campaign.

After McClellan failed to pursue the Confederate Army of Northern Virginia commanded by General Robert E. Lee from Maryland to Virginia after the Battle of Antietam on September 17, 1862, Lee planned to achieve some of his thwarted objectives from the Maryland Campaign through a cavalry raid. He asked Major General J.E.B. Stuart to lead the raid. Stuart took 1,800 men and a four-cannon light artillery battery on the raid. Stuart crossed into Maryland west of the Army of the Potomac's encampments, raided Mercersburg, Pennsylvania, Chambersburg, Pennsylvania and locations along his way, and returned south on a longer route which first took his men to the east of the Union Army positions.

Stuart achieved his objectives of securing fresh horses, mules, arms and supplies; capturing about 30 civilian officials to exchange for captured Confederates; destroying important railroad equipment, buildings and track in the vicinity of Chambersburg; capturing and paroling about 280 convalescing Union soldiers; gathering information; and avoiding a significant battle through evasion of pursuing Union cavalry. His men did fail to destroy the important railroad bridge over Conococheague Creek near Chambersburg which they were told, falsely, was made of iron. The raid contributed to President Abraham Lincoln's decision to replace McClellan as commander of the Army of the Potomac less than a month later.

== Background ==
On August 28–30, 1862, the Confederate Army of Northern Virginia commanded by General Robert E. Lee defeated Union Major General John Pope's Army of Virginia at the Second Battle of Bull Run or Second Manassas. (Note: The Army of Virginia had been created on June 26, 1862 by troops from Mountain Department of western Virginia, the Department of the Shenandoah and the Department of the Rappahannock. Units from the Army of the Potomac reinforced the Army of Virginia before the Second Battle of Bull Run. McClellan had been placed in command of the defenses of Washington, D.C. as his troops returned from the Peninsula Campaign. Sauers, Richard A. Army of Virginia in Encyclopedia of the American Civil War: A Political, Social, and Military History, edited by David S. Heidler and Jeanne T. Heidler. New York: W. W. Norton & Company, 2000. ISBN 0-393-04758-X. pp. 106–107. When McClellan was given command of Pope's troops as they returned to Washington, he abolished the Army of Virginia and combined its men with the Army of the Potomac. Rafuse, Ethan S. Army of the Potomac in Encyclopedia of the American Civil War: A Political, Social, and Military History, edited by David S. Heidler and Jeanne T. Heidler. New York: W. W. Norton & Company, 2000. ISBN 0-393-04758-X. p. 100.) Pope retreated to Centreville, Virginia where he considered having his force retreat into the defenses of Washington, D.C. Since Pope's men retreated and reorganized in seemingly good order, Major General Henry W. Halleck, then Union Army General-in-Chief, ordered Pope to attack Lee. Lee had not ordered an immediate pursuit of Pope's army because the Confederates were exhausted from three weeks of marching and the battle and were low on ammunition and supplies. On the next day, Lee ordered Major General Thomas J. "Stonewall" Jackson to outflank the Union Army and get his force between Pope's men and Washington, D.C. This led to the Battle of Chantilly or Ox Hill in Fairfax County, Virginia on September 1. Two Union Army divisions held off the Confederate force as a severe thunderstorm hampered continued fighting. After the fighting ceased, the Union forces withdrew first to Jermantown, Virginia and Fairfax Court House, Virginia and then into the Washington, D.C. defenses. This cleared the way for the Maryland Campaign, Lee's first invasion of the North.

Lee saw the Union Army defeat at Second Bull Run and its withdrawal from Chantilly into Washington as an opportunity to secure supplies and recruits in Maryland and possibly in Pennsylvania and to secure a victory that might bring foreign government recognition of the Confederacy. Meanwhile, after the Union Army's defeat and withdrawal to Washington, President Abraham Lincoln put Major General George B. McClellan back in charge of the entire Union Army in the Washington, D.C. area by adding Pope's men to his command of the Army of the Potomac. Although Lincoln was disgusted by McClellan's delays and constant calls for more men and arms earlier in the year, he recognized the need for McClellan's organizational talents to restore morale and order to the Union forces. (Note: President Lincoln officially relieved Pope of command on September 5, 1862. Hansen, 1961, p. 225. By September 12, 1862, the Army of Virginia had been totally merged into McClellan's Army of the Potomac.)

By September 3, McClellan already was aware that Lee would invade Maryland across the upper Potomac River and began to shift troops into Maryland. Otherwise, he acted without haste or energy. He was hesitant not just because that was his usual tendency but in part because he believed that Lee had about three times the number of men that he had actually brought into Maryland.

On September 13, a Union soldier, Corporal Barton W. Mitchell, found a copy of Lee's Special Order 191 which gave the disposition and objectives of his army's detachments and their instructions for joining back together. With this information, although he waited from late morning until late night to act, McClellan moved the Union Army toward Lee's location. This led to the Battle of South Mountain on September 14. A Frederick, Maryland citizen, who was at McClellan's camp, although he was a Southern sympathizer, saw McClellan's reaction on that morning and warned Lee of the Union's intelligence coup. Lee saw the danger from McClellan's acquisition of this information and from the Union troop movements in his direction. He sent instructions for the detachments he had sent on various missions to rejoin the main body of his troops at Sharpsburg, Maryland as soon as possible. On September 16, the opposing armies were taking up positions near Antietam Creek just outside Sharpsburg. On September 17, the Union and Confederate forces fought the Battle of Antietam, the bloodiest single day of battle in the Civil War. Although his force was badly depleted and outnumbered after the heavy fighting, Lee kept his army at the field during the next day, but moved across the Potomac to Virginia that night. At Antietam, the Union Army recovered from the defeat at Second Manassas and put an abrupt end to Lee's Maryland Campaign. Nonetheless, McClellan lost the opportunity to destroy the Confederate army and allowed Lee to escape, reorganize and make up his losses.

President Lincoln was disturbed that McClellan did not follow up on his gains of the previous day or immediately pursue Lee's army. On October 6, Halleck, on behalf of the President, ordered McClellan to pursue Lee, but McClellan continued to delay.

== Plan ==
On October 6, the same day Halleck ordered McClellan to move, Lee asked Major General J.E.B. Stuart, to make a raid toward Chambersburg, Pennsylvania. Lee wanted Stuart to destroy the important railroad bridge over the Conococheague Creek, bring back horses and capture government officials who might be exchanged for captured Confederate leaders or sympathizers. (Note: Lee had instructed Stuart, "To keep your movement secret, it will be necessary for you to arrest >11 citizens that may give information to the enemy, and should you meet with citizens of Pennsylvania holding State or Government offices, ! it will be desirable, if convenient, to bring them with you, that they may ! be used as hostages, or the means of exchanges, for our own citizens I that have been carried off by the enemy." Stuart went even further,} "As a measure of justice to our many good citizens who, without crime, have been taken from their homes and kept by the enemy in prison, all public functionaries, such as magistrates, postmasters, sheriffs, &c., will be seized as prisoners.") The railroad bridge was an important link in the movement of supplies to the Union Army at Hagerstown, Maryland. Lee also wanted "all information of the position, force and probable intention of the enemy."

Stuart picked 1,800 men, divided into three groups led by Brigadier Generals Wade Hampton III, W.H.F. "Rooney" Lee and William E. "Grumble" Jones, and Major John Pelham's four-gun battery of light horse artillery to carry out the mission. (Note: Lee had instructed Stuart to take 1,200 to 1,500 men on the raid but Stuart increased that number to 1,800. Freeman, 1943, p. 286.) Stuart ordered his men to observe "implicit obedience to orders...and the strictest order and sobriety on the march and in bivouac." They set out for Maryland from Darkesville, (West) Virginia on the night of October 9, and camped at Hedgesville, (West) Virginia in what is now the Eastern Panhandle of West Virginia before crossing the Potomac at dawn on October 10. (Note: McCoy's Ford was about 5 miles (8.0 km) north of Hedgesville and 10 miles (16 km) up the Potomac River from Williamsport. Freeman, 1943, p. 286.)

== Raid ==
=== October 10, 1862 ===
A small detachment of the 12th Illinois Cavalry Regiment under Captain Thomas Logan observed Stuart's force cross the Potomac River at McCoy's Ford near Old Fort Frederick, Maryland, west of Williamsport, Maryland, on the morning of October 10, but the small force could do no more than send the information back to Union headquarters as it was scattered out of its position by an advance detail of Stuart's men. (Note: The Illinois cavalry patrol correctly reported Stuart's direction toward Mercersburg, Pennsylvania although they overestimated his men to be about 2,500 in number and that he had 8 cannons with him rather than the 4 cannons he actually had. Longacre, 2002, pp. 143–145.) At this point, Stuart was only 8 miles (13 km) from the Maryland-Pennsylvania state line. Stuart also learned that he had narrowly missed being intercepted by six regiments of infantry under the command of Major General Jacob Cox when he reached the National Road. A detail captured a signal station at Fairview Heights, Maryland while Stuart's force moved north, guided by Maryland native, Captain Benjamin S. White.

Stuart ordered his men to take any horses they could carry off but not to pillage personal property or to take plunder for private use. Pennsylvanians, Hugh and Alexander Logan, guided the Confederate force after they crossed into Pennsylvania. The Confederates seized shoes and clothing at Mercersburg, Pennsylvania and paid for it with Confederate scrip. A Mercersburg doctor said that the Confederates "behaved very decently. They were gentlemen's robbers."

By dark, at around 7:00 p.m., in a steady rain, the Confederates reached Chambersburg with the many horses and much fresh food and supplies that they had picked up already. Town officials sent an alarm to Governor Andrew Curtin, who passed the message on to United States Secretary of War Edwin M. Stanton just before the Confederates cut the telegraph wires. After Stuart demanded and received surrender of the town, he appointed Wade Hampton as its "military governor." Stuart and his staff took time to sign the register at the Franklin Hotel. Stuart's men took as many arms, ammunition, and military clothing as they could carry from a local warehouse and destroyed the rest.

Stuart tried to take the money from the town's bank but a banker had removed the funds before Stuart's arrival. Stuart sent a party to destroy the Cumberland Valley Railroad bridge over Conococheague Creek, sometimes referred to as the Conococheague River, but the men could not find a way to destroy the bridge. Historian Jeffry Wert says that the Confederate patrol under Captain Thomas Whitehead sent to destroy the bridge in the pouring rain actually never reached the bridge. (Note: Wert's first name is correctly spelled Jeffry.) Relying on a false response from local citizens who told the raiders that the bridge was made of iron, they turned back. Historian Edward G. Longacre also wrote that the raiders did not reach the bridge, which they mistakenly believed to be almost entirely built of wrought iron. In fact, Wert states that the bridge was wooden and subsequently was destroyed during the Gettysburg campaign. The Confederates were able to capture and parole 280 sick and wounded Union soldiers convalescing in the town. (Note: Some sources do not mention the condition of the Union soldiers but it is clear they put up no resistance because of the lack of reported casualties by either side.) They set ablaze the Chambersburg railroad depot, loaded trains, machine shops and warehouses with military supplies.

After he heard of Stuart's movement, Major General Halleck ordered Major General McClellan to close all roads back to Virginia and to be sure none of the Confederates could return. McClellan sent out his cavalry and sent infantry to guard the river crossings, assuring Halleck that Stuart would not escape. However, McClellan had sent much of his cavalry to western Maryland because of pleas from local commanders for help against Confederate raiders and a diversionary movement toward Cumberland, Maryland by a Confederate detachment from Lee's army. Also, McClellan's response was both slow and erratic, leaving little time or opportunity for his men to catch up with Stuart. (Note: Pleasonton at least made a good effort to catch Stuart. Brigadier General William W. Averell delayed for eight hours and then headed due north, leaving him many miles from Chambersburg and Stuart's force and giving Averell no chance of catching Stuart. Longacre, 2000, p. 109. However, Pleasonton wore out his men and horses in fruitless chasing of Stuart. When his advance units encountered part of Stuart's force during the night of October 11, he pulled them back and had his men ride parallel to Stuart's line of march. Longacre, 2000, p. 110. His actions on October 12 are stated in the text above.) Ultimately Stuart evaded or outran all of the forces McClellan sent after him or to guard the river crossings.

=== October 11, 1862 ===
On the morning of October 11, Stuart's men began their return movement along a different route to the east by way of Cashtown, Pennsylvania and into Maryland through Emmitsburg, Maryland on their way back to Virginia. The rain from the previous day left the ground wet and the 5-mile (8-kilometer) long column raised no dust from which they might be detected. They rode within 8 miles (13 km) of the small town of Gettysburg, Pennsylvania on their way. At Emmitsburg, Maryland, a pro-Confederate crowd welcomed the raiders, who did not linger but quickly moved on toward Frederick, Maryland. They captured a Union courier about 6 miles (9.7 km) south of Emmitsburg with information which disclosed some of the Union cavalry movements, allowing Stuart to change his route again to avoid Union troops at Frederick, but also assuring him that his location was not definitely known. Confederate troopers who had lived in the vicinity guided Stuart on back roads to avoid being observed by Union scouts. Stuart's longer return route to the east and south allowed him to avoid any troops that might be waiting for his return along his original, more hilly, route, and enabled him to again completely circle McClellan's army.

Near dark, at Woodsboro, Maryland, off the main road from Frederick, troops of the 6th Pennsylvania Cavalry Regiment saw the Confederates, but were too few in number to mount an attack. (Note: Wert, 2005, p. 174 says that the four companies of Pennsylvania cavalry rode through Emmitsburg an hour before the Confederates arrived there.) The Confederates had ridden completely around the Union Army of more than 100,000 men still encamped in the general region of the Antietam battlefield.

During the night, as his men continued to ride, Stuart, with about 12 men, visited a young woman at Urbana, Maryland whose family sympathized with the Confederates and whom he had met during the Antietam campaign. He stayed about half an hour and returned to the column at about 7:00 a.m. The troopers rode all night, cutting telegraph wires and obstructing the Baltimore and Ohio Railroad as they went, and some were literally falling asleep in the saddle as they pressed on.

=== October 12, 1862 ===
On the morning of October 12, scouts reported to Stuart that Union Brigadier General George Stoneman was guarding the Potomac River fords near Poolesville, Maryland with several thousand men. On the 11 miles (18 km) of the Potomac River from the mouth of the Monocacy River to Edwards Ferry, which is near Poolesville, at least four crossings were available. Stuart followed the recommendation of Captain White, who was from the local area, to avoid Stoneman's likely position by using White's Ford, which was 3 miles (4.8 km) below the mouth of the Monocacy River near present-day White's Ferry and little used as it was a rough crossing, to cross the Potomac to Loudoun County, Virginia.

Stuart did not come into contact with Stoneman, whose men, other than a small guard unit, arrived at White's Ford too late to confront the Confederates. His force did meet Union cavalry commanded by Brigadier General Alfred Pleasonton at the mouth of the Monocacy River near Barnesville, Maryland. Pleasonton initially was deceived by the blue uniforms the Confederates were wearing after having acquired them during the raid. Pleasonton ordered his men to fire when the Confederates charged from a short distance away. Then he withdrew his men to engage in a long range rifle fire exchange with Stuart's sharpshooters and cannon. Pleasonton was not at full strength, since he had sent many of his men toward a ford near the mouth of the Monocacy River in a mistaken guess about where Stuart was headed. Here the Union cavalry encountered Union infantry and both paused in order to insure that the other party was not a Confederate force in Union uniforms.

Meanwhile, Confederate Brigadier General W.H.F. Lee demanded the surrender of about 200 Union infantry blocking the way to the ford because, as he wrote to them, the Confederates were present in overwhelming force. This and some cannon and rifle fire bluffed and forced the Union soldiers to abandon their strong position. The Union troops did not flee completely but lingered in the vicinity awaiting possible reinforcements, who as it turned out were busy identifying each other. The ford now was open for the Confederates to cross.

Pelham's artillery came up and kept the Union forces, including Pleasonton's men, back while Stuart's men crossed the Potomac with their 1,200 captured horses, supplies and 30 civilian hostages. It was a close call for Stuart's rear section which had been deployed to protect the column and needed to be urged to withdraw quickly in order not to be caught by Union reinforcements.

The small Union force detailed to White's Ford, where Lee had crossed into Maryland in September, proved to be a weak link in McClellan's dispositions. Although Union reinforcements arrived just after the last of Stuart's men crossed the Potomac, Pleasonton did not believe it would be useful to pursue the Confederates across the river. The Confederates soon rode safely into Leesburg, Virginia with their captured horses, supplies and hostages and without having lost a man to death or a serious injury.

== Aftermath ==
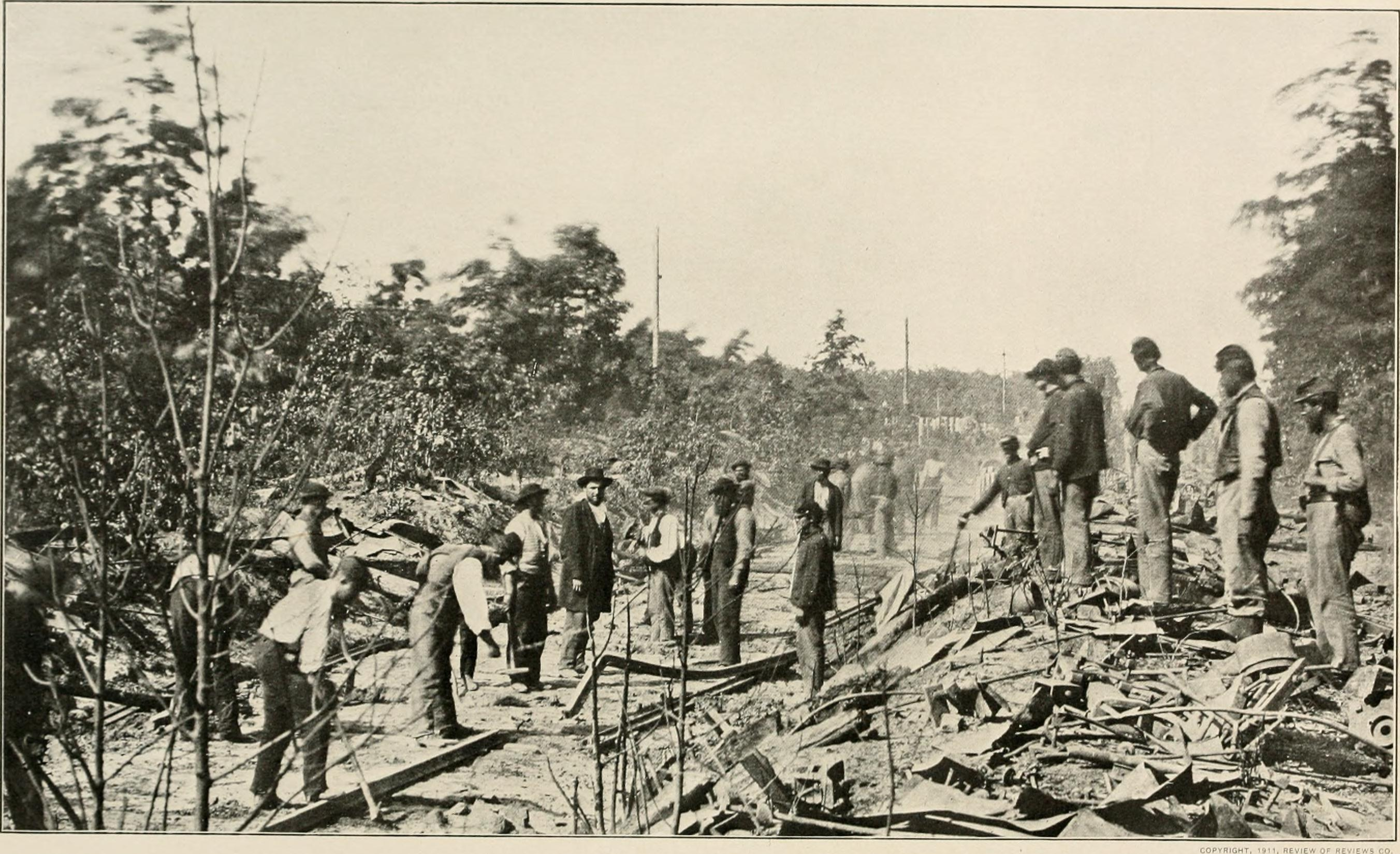
Rebuilding destroyed railroad

Stuart had managed a "second ride around McClellan," as he had done during the Peninsula Campaign four months earlier. He had traveled 126 miles (203 km). The Confederates progressed over the final 80 miles (130 km) in 36 hours without a stop. Stuart had two men missing and a few wounded upon his return to Virginia. About 60 broken down Confederate horses were left behind. Stuart also returned without his servant, Bob, who had fallen asleep along the route and, along with two of Stuart's three horses, had been captured by Union soldiers. In late November, however, Bob rejoined Stuart.

Stuart had secured the parole of 280 soldiers, captured about 1,200 horses, 30 public officials, a variety of arms and ammunition, intelligence about the Union Army and turned aside Pleasonton's force while embarrassing McClellan. His men had destroyed the railroad depot, shops, warehouses and several miles of railroad line, although they failed to destroy the Conococheague Creek railroad bridge. Stuart's force also captured at least 8 local free blacks and took them back into the South to be enslaved. (Note: As many as thirty civilians were brought back and interened as hostages in Libby Prison, in addition to the black men seized in Chambersburg, it appears that "several colored men were taken captive and carried to Richmond." Due to bands of contrabands congregated around Union camps, Rebel attempts to re-enslave (or enslave inre free black residents) them were not uncommon during incursions into Union held territory. The prior month when Jackson captured Harpers Ferry, he paroled its white garrison, but prevented the large black refugee population from crossing the Potomac to freedom and sending perhaps as many as one thousand blacks were taken south into bondage.) The value of the destroyed property was estimated at about quarter of a million dollars at the time.

Stuart's Chambersburg raid provided a boost to Confederate morale and corresponding depression of Union morale, especially among the cavalry, and embarrassment to McClellan and Lincoln administration so soon after the Battle of Antietam. Sergeant Major Elisha Hunt Rhodes wrote in his diary: "We are very much ashamed that the Rebels were allowed to make their late raid into Pennsylvania...." Union Brigadier General Marsena R. Patrick said the affair was "a burning disgrace."

The raid also provided Lee with information about McClellan's dispositions and intentions. Stuart received near universal acclaim in the South, including Robert E. Lee's conclusion that the raid was "eminently successful" and his praise for Stuart's "boldness, judgment and prowess." Brigadier General Jubal Early did not entirely agree, calling the raid "the greatest horse stealing expedition" that only "annoyed" the enemy. Many of the horses were draft animals, fit for hauling artillery but not of much use for cavalry.

McClellan responded to his failure to keep his assurance to Halleck that he would capture or destroy Stuart's force with a variety of excuses, including the poor condition of his cavalry's horses, and by having his cavalry undertake a reconnaissance towards Charlestown, (West) Virginia and Martinsburg, (West) Virginia. The destruction of supplies at Chambersburg and the failure of the Union quartermasters to get supplies to Harpers Ferry, (West) Virginia and Hagerstown, Maryland, when McClellan expected them on October 10, gave McClellan further reasons to postpone the movement of his army. In view of his conclusion about the fatigue of his horses from heavy patrolling and the chase of Stuart's force, on October 21, McClellan, who still was encamped in Maryland, sent Halleck a message asking for more horses. President Lincoln responded to McClellan in a telegram asking: "Will you pardon me for asking what the horses of your army have done since the Battle of Antietam that fatigue anything?" McClellan did not send his army toward Warrenton, Virginia until October 25. It took nine days to get the men and equipment entirely across the river. (Note: Longacre, 2002, p. 152 states the crossing took place from October 25, 1862 through October 30, 1862.) Stuart's cavalry fought a series of inconclusive cavalry skirmishes with various Union Army units in Loudoun County, Virginia, between October 31 – November 2, in what is now known as The Battle of Unison or Battle of Union.

McClellan's failure to deal effectively with the Chambersburg raid contributed to his imminent loss of his command. As McClellan allowed Lee's army to get between his army and Richmond, Virginia, President Lincoln reached the end of his patience with McClellan and replaced him as commander of the Army of the Potomac with Major General Ambrose Burnside on November 7.
