= Beefsteak Raid =

Part of the American Civil War

Coordinates: 37.2982°N 77.1650°W

- Part of the American Civil War
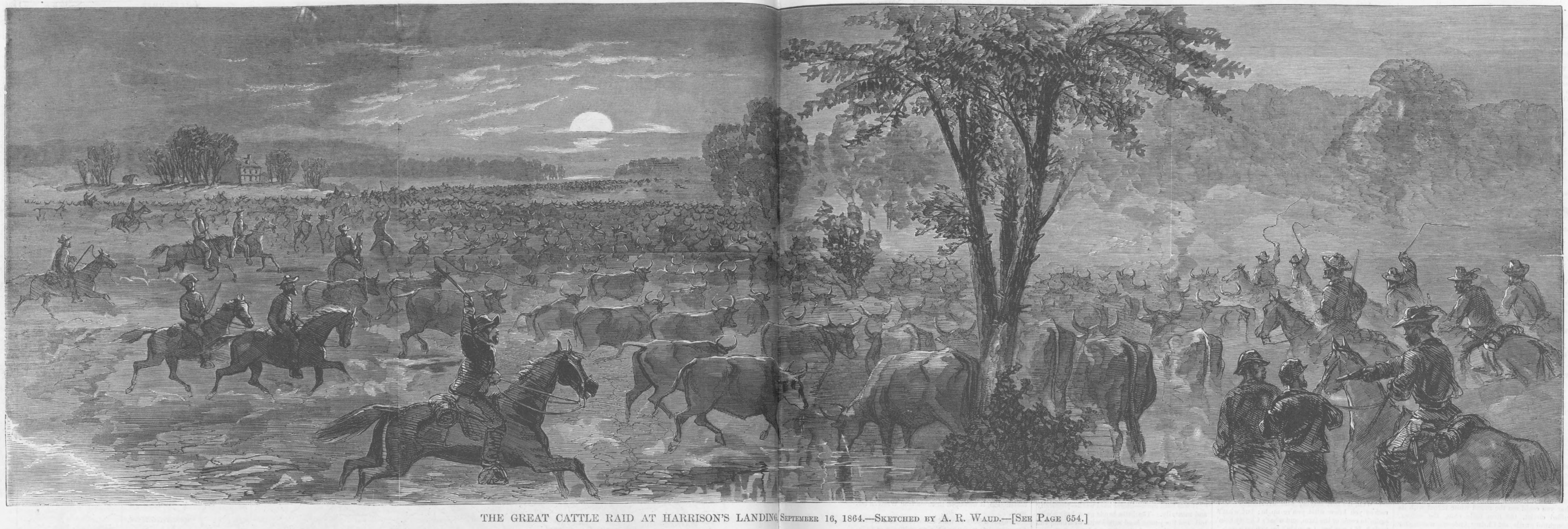
- "The Great Cattle Raid at Harrison's Landing" (from Harper's Weekly)
Date	September 14, 1864 – September 17, 1864
Location	Prince George County, Virginia
Result	Confederate victory

Belligerents
United States (Union)	(Confederate States of America) CSA (Confederacy)

Commanders and leaders
	Wade Hampton

Strength
	3,000

Casualties and losses
304 captured 2,685 cattle captured	10 killed 47 wounded 4 missing

The Beefsteak Raid was a Confederate cavalry raid that took place in September 1864 as part of the Siege of Petersburg during the American Civil War. Confederate Maj. Gen. Wade Hampton led a force of 3,000 troopers of the Confederate States Army on what was to become a 100-mile (160 km) ride to acquire cattle that were intended for consumption by the Union Army, which was laying a combined siege to the cities of Richmond and Petersburg, Virginia.

== Background ==
Always lacking in supplies, the Confederate forces that were defending the capital of Richmond were beginning to run out of food. A report by General Robert E. Lee on August 22, 1864, stated that corn to feed the Southern soldiers was exhausted. A scout, Sergeant George D. Shadburne, informed General Hampton on September 5 that there were 3,000 lightly defended cattle behind Union lines, at Edmund Ruffin's plantation on Coggin's Point, 5 miles (8 km) down the James River from Lt. Gen. Ulysses S. Grant's headquarters. Believing the cattle were defended by only 120 Union soldiers and 30 civilians (the actual force was larger, but still less than 500), Hampton arranged for 3,000 Confederate troops to follow him.

== Raid ==
On September 14, 1864, Hampton led his men to the south of Petersburg and the Union trenches, in order to eventually turn north behind Union lines. He chose to cross where the Cook's Bridge over the Blackwater River once stood, knowing that an attack from there would be unexpected. He had some engineers reconstruct the bridge. At 5 a.m. on September 16, Hampton's force attacked with a three-prong strike, with the center directed toward the cattle. Hampton's force captured more than 2,000 cattle, along with 11 wagons and 304 prisoners, leading them back to the Confederate lines at 9 a.m. on September 17.

== Aftermath ==
The total losses for the Confederates, who saw some opposition, were 10 killed, 47 wounded, and 4 missing. The official count of cattle successfully reaching the Confederates for food was 2,468.

For days afterwards, the southerners would taunt the northern sentries, thanking them for all the food and inviting them over for dinner. There was so much beef available that Confederate sentries would sometimes offer it in unauthorized trades with Union sentries for certain luxury items of which the Federal soldiers had a plentiful supply, but the Confederates lacked.

Abraham Lincoln called the raid "the slickest piece of cattle-stealing" he ever heard of. General Lee's adjutant, Lt. Col. Walter H. Taylor, said it made up for disruption of Confederate supply lines caused by the loss of the Weldon Railroad.

== Legacy ==
Much of the action of the Beefsteak Raid took place in Prince George County. The Prince George County Regional Heritage Center commemorates the raid with a steak dinner each September.

A fictionalized depiction of the raid is featured in the 1966 film Alvarez Kelly.
