= August Kautz =

Union Army General

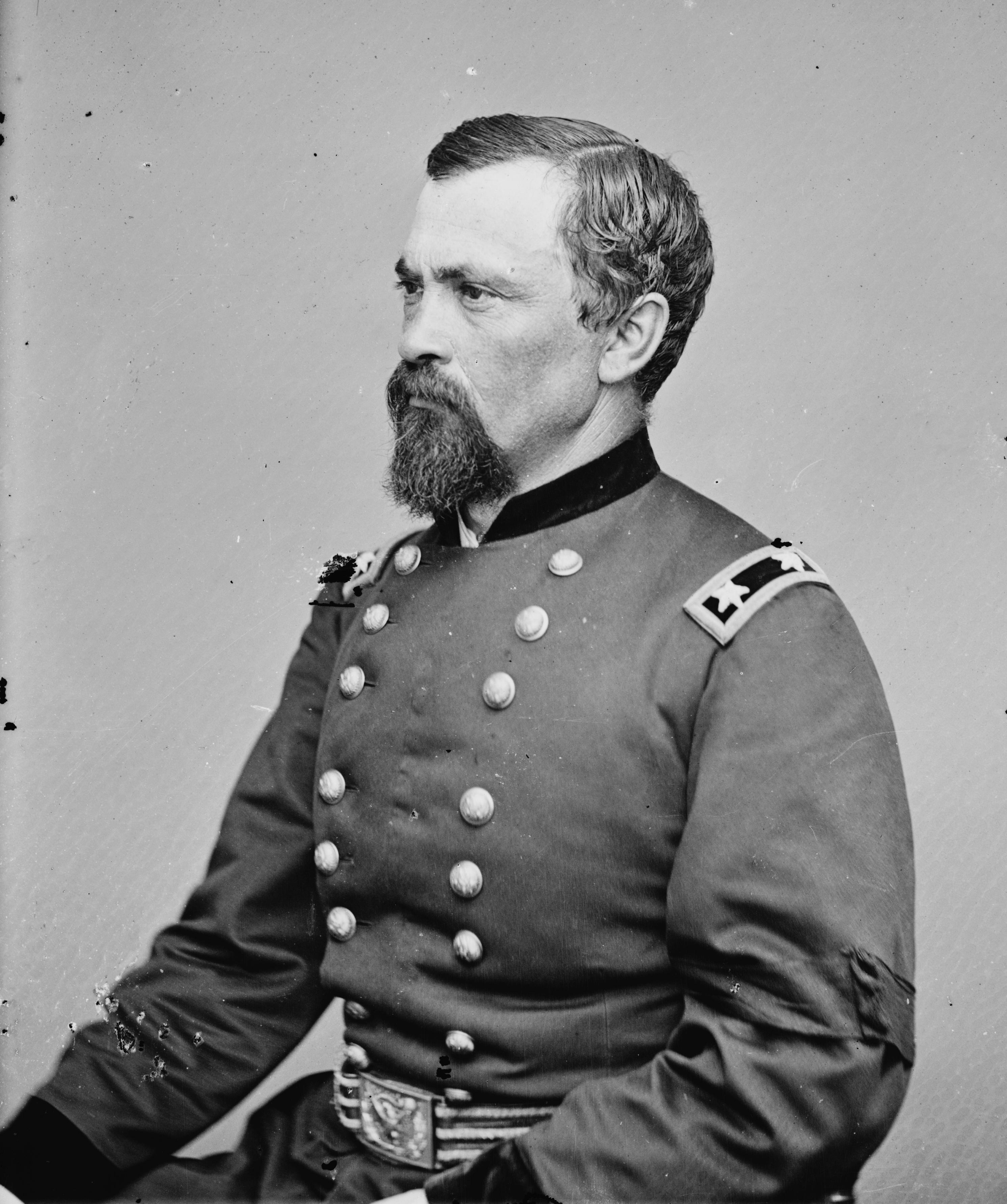
- August Kautz
- Born: January 5, 1828; Ispringen, Grand Duchy of Baden
- Died: September 4, 1895 (aged 67); Seattle, Washington, US
- Burial place: Arlington National Cemetery
- Relatives: Rear Admiral Albert Kautz (brother)
- Military career
- Allegiance: United States of America; Union
- Branch: United States Army; Union Army
- Service years: 1846–1847, 1852–1892
- Rank: Brigadier General; Brevet Major General
- Commands: 2nd Ohio Cavalry; 15th U.S. Infantry; 8th U.S. Infantry; Department of the Columbia
- Conflicts: Mexican–American War; Rogue River Wars; Puget Sound War; American Civil War; Peninsula Campaign; Battle of Buffington Island; Bermuda Hundred Campaign; Siege of Petersburg

August Valentine Kautz (January 5, 1828 – September 4, 1895) was a German-American officer. He served in the Rogue River Wars and Puget Sound War. He served as a general in the Union cavalry during the American Civil War. He was the author of several army manuals on duties and customs eventually adopted by the U.S. military.

== Early life and career ==
Born in Ispringen, Baden, Germany, Kautz immigrated with his parents to Brown County, Ohio in 1832. He later enlisted as a Private in the 1st Ohio Infantry, serving in the Mexican–American War from 1846 to 1847.

Entering the United States Military Academy following the war, Kautz graduated in the class of 1852. He primarily served at Fort Steilacoom in the Pacific Northwest, where he was wounded twice with the 4th U.S. Infantry during Rogue River Wars with Indians along the Rogue River in 1855, and also served in the Puget Sound War in 1856. He was rewarded with a commission as a lieutenant in the regular army.

In the 1850s he married a Nisqually woman named Tenas Puss (Little Kitten) called Etta or Kitty in English. Son, Nugen, was born in 1857 and son, Doctin (later changed to Augustus) was born 1859. Both sons attended the Forest Grove Indian Training School (later called the Chemawa Indian School.)

On July 16, 1857, Kautz made what is sometimes credited as the first ascent of Mount Rainier. Kautz is reported as having climbed to the edge of Rainier's crater rim, but as he did not make the final walk to Rainier's Columbia Crest, his ascent has often been described as incomplete.

During his time in the Pacific Northwest, Kautz became a supporter of Chief Leschi, who was executed in 1858. Kautz believed the execution was illegal and that Leschi should have been considered a prisoner of war. Shortly before Leschi's execution, Kautz published two issues of a newspaper defending him. The newspaper was called the Truth Teller, and its masthead stated: "Devoted to the Dissemination of Truth and the Suppression of Humbug."

From 1859 to 1860, he traveled in Europe. In August 1860, under Major George A. H. Blake's command, he traveled with recruits on a march from Fort Benton to Fort Vancouver, commanding a detachment of 150 recruits, which broke off from the main group at Coeur d'Alene, Idaho to begin service at Colville Depot, Washington Territory. He returned to the Eastern United States in April 1861, shortly after the outbreak of hostilities between the Union and Confederacy.

== Civil War ==
Kautz was a captain with the 6th U.S. Cavalry during the Peninsula Campaign from April to July 1862. Transferred to the Western Theater, Kautz later assisted in operations as a colonel with the 2nd Ohio Cavalry against Confederate General John Hunt Morgan's raid behind Union lines in Indiana and Ohio during June–July 1863 and under the command of Maj. Gen. Ambrose Burnside at the Battle of Knoxville from September to December 1863.

Promoted to brigadier general of volunteers on April 16, 1864, Kautz led cavalry operations under the command of Maj. Gen. Benjamin Butler during Ulysses S. Grant's campaigns against Richmond and Petersburg between April and June 1864. His cavalry division was a part of the Army of the James and was forced to withdraw from its position at White's Tavern following an attack by parts of Confederate Lt. Gen. Richard H. Anderson's Corps. On December 12, 1864, President Abraham Lincoln nominated Kautz for appointment to the brevet grade of major general of volunteers, to rank from October 28, 1864, and the U.S. Senate confirmed the appointment on February 14, 1865. He was mustered out of the volunteers on January 15, 1866. On July 17, 1866, President Andrew Johnson nominated Kautz for appointment to the brevet grade of major general, U.S. Army, to rank from March 13, 1865, and the U.S. Senate confirmed the appointment on July 23, 1866.

In early April 1865, Kautz marched into Richmond in command of a division of colored troops which belonged to Godfrey Weitzel's XXV Corps. He was active during the Union pursuit of Robert E. Lee from April 2 to April 9, 1865, until Lee's surrender at Appomattox Court House.

== After the Civil War ==
After the war, Kautz served (from May to June 1865) on the trial board investigating the conspirators involved in the assassination of President Abraham Lincoln, before performing extensive service in the southwest frontier. He was the commander of the Department of Arizona from March 1875 to March 1878, and commanding officer of Fort McDowell. He was appointed commander of the Department of the Columbia in July 1891 with the rank of brigadier general. After leaving military service in 1892, he lived in retirement until his death at Seattle, Washington. He is buried in Arlington National Cemetery.

== Bibliography ==
- The Company Clerk (1863)
- Customs of Service for Non-Commissioned Officers and Soldiers (1864)
- Customs of Service for Officers (1866)

== See also ==
- Wilson-Kautz Raid, which Kautz helped lead
- List of American Civil War generals (Union)
- Battles of the American Civil War
- Bibliography of Ulysses S. Grant
- Bibliography of the American Civil War
