= Milton Cline =

Union scout and Colorado pioneer (1825–1911)

Captain Milton Cline
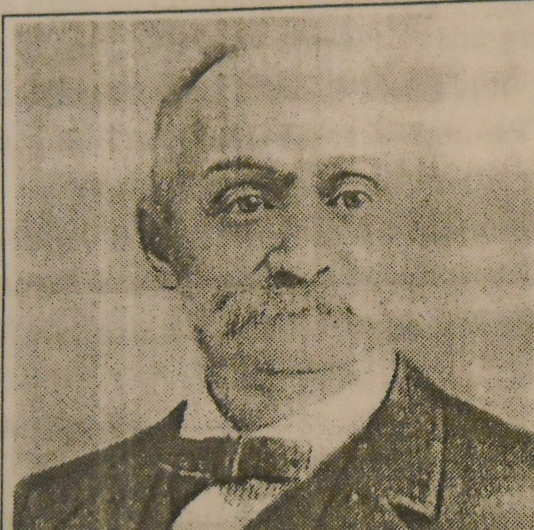
- Born: May 16, 1827; Whitehall, New York
- Died: October 7, 1911 (aged 84); Montrose County, Colorado
- Burial place: Cimmaron, Colorado
- Occupations: Scout, prospector, pioneer
- Known for: Founding of Ouray County, Colorado
- Spouse: Eliazabeth
- Children: 3, including T.H. and William

Milton William Cline (May 16, 1827 in Whitehall, New York – October 7, 1911 in Montrose County, Colorado) was a 19th-century American sailor, soldier, scout and pioneer. His name appears throughout the history of the United States Civil War and post-bellum period.

== Early life ==
Milton Cline was born in Whitehall, New York to German immigrants, William and Martha Cline on May 16, 1827.

Cline began his career as a sailor aboard the whaling ship SS South Carolina in 1846. He married his wife Elizabeth in 1852. The pair would have three children together.

== Military career ==
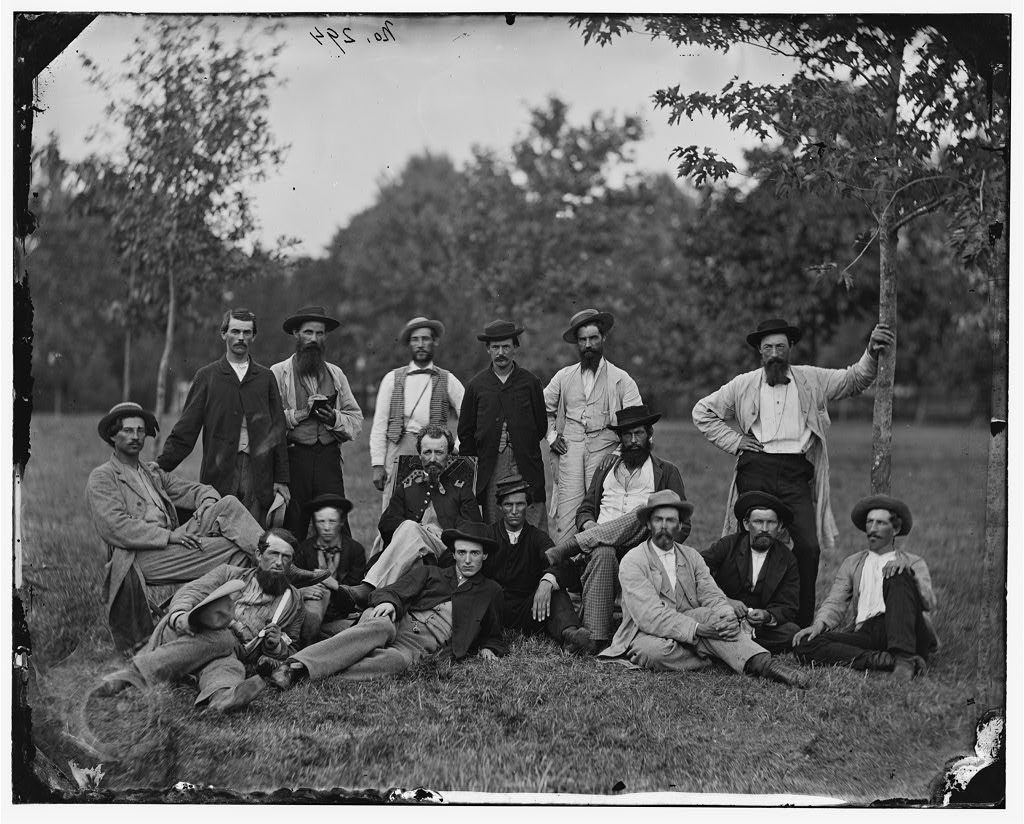
Picture of Milton W Cline (seated in center) 1864 provided by Library of Congress

Prior to the US Civil War, Cline moved to Indiana. During the War, he served as a scout with the 3rd Regiment Indiana Cavalry. Under the command of Major General Joseph Hooker and Major General George Henry Sharpe Cline was assigned to a newly formed core of scouts. He later rose to chief scout. In one mission, Sgt. Cline managed to attach himself to a Confederate cavalry captain and rode the entire length of Lee's lines a few days before the Battle of Chancellorsville. Sharpe requested that Federal military authorities send him tens of thousands of dollars in captured Confederate currency, for him to give to his military scouts and civilian spies to use.

Cline's success as a spy was mixed. According to one account, he accomplished "the deepest and longest infiltration of the Confederate Army recorded during the war" and was instrumental in obtaining key intelligence about orders being sent by Jefferson Davis. However, he was later blamed for the failure of an infiltration mission, the Kilpatrick-Dahlgren Raid during the Battle of Walkerton, leading to the infamous Dahlgren affair. The botched raid caused all but one of the infiltrators to be killed or captured. Colonel Ulric Dahlgren was killed in retreat, and the later desecration of his corpse by the Confederates caused great offence across the north.

Cline and the rest of the 3rd Indiana Cavalry were mustered out of the Union Civil War ranks in August 1864. Cline would later be known as "Captain", yet no information remains how he became known by this title.

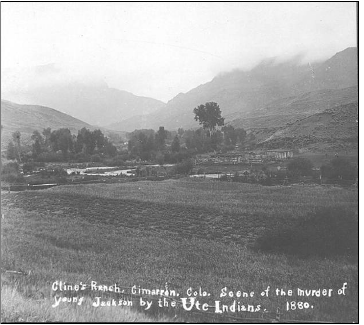
Early photo of "Then Cline Ranch"

== Colorado pioneer ==
After the Civil War, Cline moved west. Historical records list Cline as one of the first prospectors and founding settlers of the county and town seat of Ouray, Colorado. By 1875, Cline had travelled from Silverton to explore the area that would come to be known as Ouray.

=== Founding of Ouray ===
Ouray was incorporated by Cline and Judge R.F. Long in August 1876. Cline served as President of the Board of Trustees for the county's incorporation, and paid for some of the incorporation expenses.

At the time, the terrain around Ouray was treacherous and difficult to reach. Positioned at the north end of the San Juan mountains, sheer cliff faces prevented easy access. It would be years before Otto Mears would build the "impossible road" linking Ouray to Silverton. Later parts of the route would become known as the Million Dollar Highway.

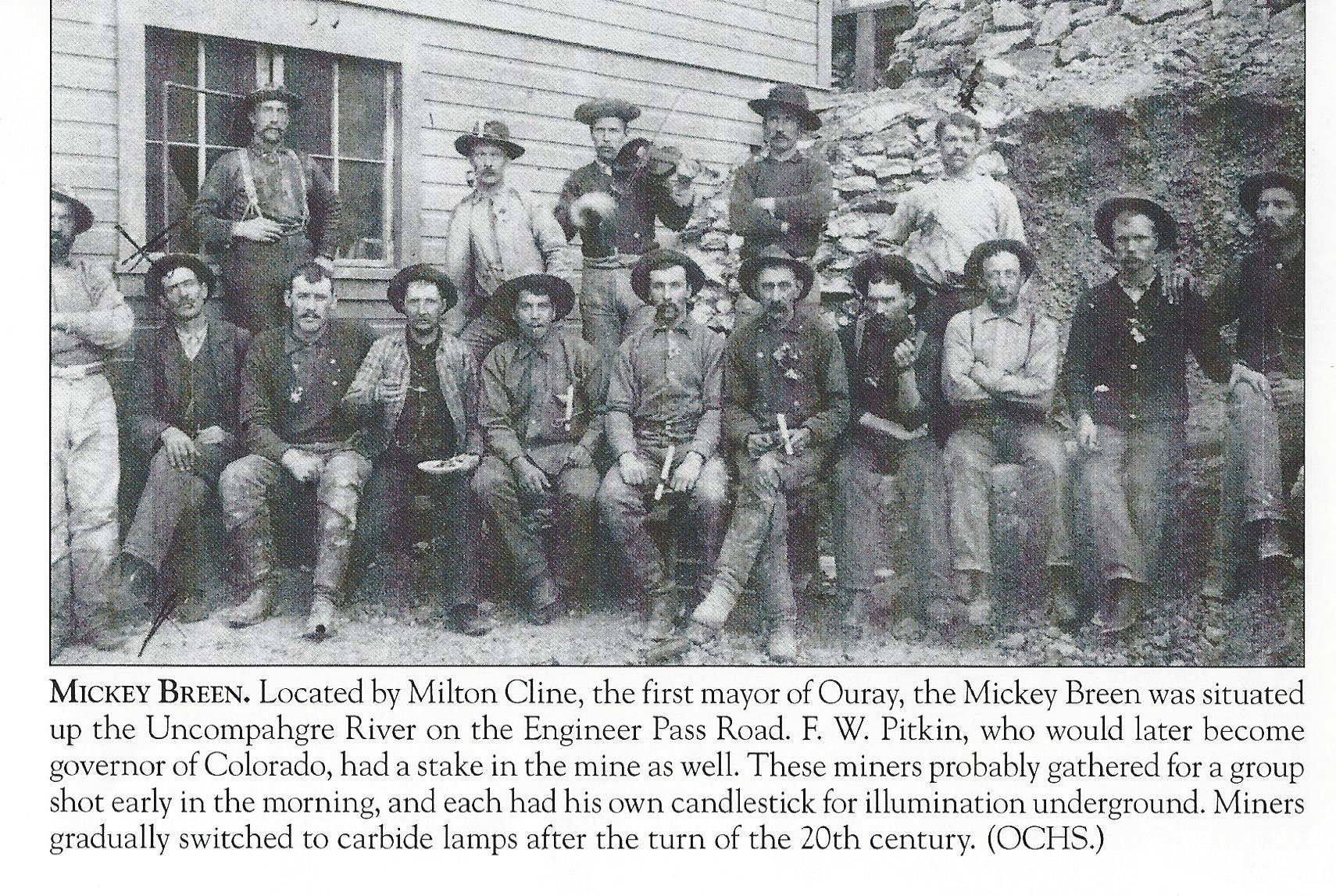
Picture of Mickey Breen Mine workers, candlesticks in hand ready to go underground to mine

By November 1876, Ouray had 400 inhabitants. "Captain" Milton W. Cline is listed as Ouray's first postmaster, treasurer, Justice of the Peace, mayor and Sheriff of Cimarron. Shortly after being appointed county treasurer, in March of that year, he resigned the role of treasurer. In 1877, he was named to the board of the first Bank of Ouray.

=== Business endeavors ===
Alongside Frederick Walker Pitkin, Cline founded the Michael "Mickey" Breen mine on Engineer Pass. After several years of prospecting and owning mines such as "The Mickey Breen" and "Mother Cline Slide", Cline became a cattle rancher. Between 1876 and 1879, Capt. Cline and his family settled in Cimarron, Colorado. At its peak, Cline's ranch covered 450 acres (180 ha) and had 5,400 head of cattle.

Cline's ranch in Cimarron was a regular stopping off point for travelers and he was additionally engaged as a road overseer. His ranch was described as a "headquarters for strangers", where "no one goes away hungry". There, he managed a stage coach station where passengers rested overnight, an enterprise that was said to make him "lots of money". Cline's wife Elizabeth, known as "Mother" to visitors, was esteemed for her hospitality to ranch visitors and those passing through the area.

== Involvement with the Ute people ==
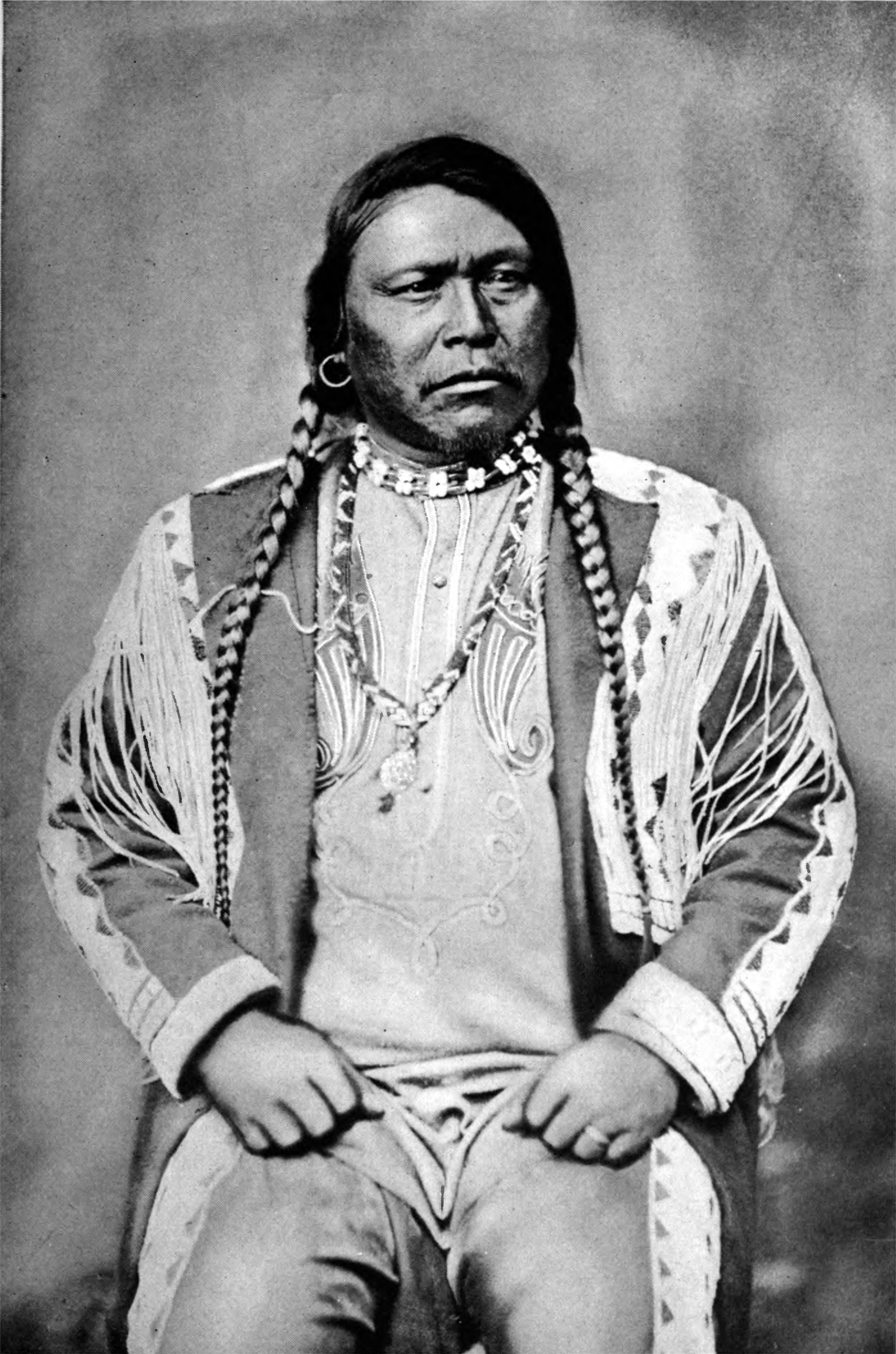
Chief Ouray

Cline had a close relationship with Chief Ouray and the Ute people who neighbored his range. He was known to intervene in local disputes between the Tabeguache and the white settlers, and his ranch became a meeting spot to resolve conflicts. Governor Pitkin claimed Cline had more influence when negotiating with the Ute than any other white man in Colorado.

=== Meeker Massacre ===
During the hostage crisis following the Meeker Massacre, Cline was among the party sent by the US government to negotiate the release of hostages taken by the Utes. Cline personally drove the wagon that carried Chief Ouray and his wife Chipeta to negotiate the release of women settlers that had been taken hostage. After negotiations for their freedom were secured, Cline drove the party to safety.

=== Blue Mountain Incident ===
In 1880, Cline was imprisoned after becoming involved in an incident between Ute tribe members and a travelling freight wagon crew.

On September 29, 1880, several Ute tribe members went into a freight wagon's camp on nearby Blue Mountain Mesa asking for food. They were refused by the travelling party. As the tribe members departed, one of the freighters, A Donald Jackson shot and killed one of the inquiring tribe members, Johnson Shavano. The murder victim happened to be the son of the Ute Chief Shavano.

After the shooting, the freighters quickly moved their camp to Cline's ranch for safety, as some military troops were camping there. Upon learning of the shooting, 60 Utes assembled by Shavano, headed to Cline's ranch to avenge Johnson Shavano's death. On his ranch, Cline found several bands of angry Ute warriors potentially coming in contact with the 500 assembled infantry and 3-400 assembled cavalry troops camping there, as well as the group of freighters who perpetuated the incident. Sensing the situation could quickly get out of control if the military became involved, Cline, in an effort to reduce tension, sought to appeal to the Utes by suggesting to take perpetrator A.D. Jackson to Gunnison to stand trial for Johnson's murder.

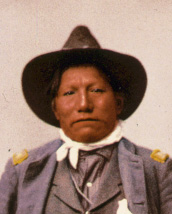
Ute Chief Sarvano from the incident

Cline assured the military that he could escort Jackson to Gunnison safely without retribution. Cline and three military escorts set off with Jackson the next morning. Three miles outside Cline's ranch, Jackson was taken hostage, said to be tortured and subsequently killed by the vigilantes. Cline was considered responsible for turning Jackson over to the Utes for retribution. Cline was arrested for complicity in Jackson's murder and placed in Gunnison jail. Due to the allegations of torture, and the ongoing challenges settlers were having with the Ute people, Cline was vilified in the press for his alleged involvement in the crime, and significant funds were raised to support his conviction. While Cline was in prison, rumors circulated in the county that a band of Ute warriors was making plans to spring him from jail.

At his trial, Cline was described as well-educated, and "intelligent in his conversation". Taking the stand in his defense, Cline was "convincing" at showing that he was a victim of circumstance, rather than a perpetrator. Cline was eventually cleared of all wrongdoing. Later, Jackson's body was found and did not show evidence of torture.

The next year, a Grand Jury indicted a number of Ute warriors for Jackson's death. Cline was named accessory to murder, causing him great anguish. The case never went to trial.

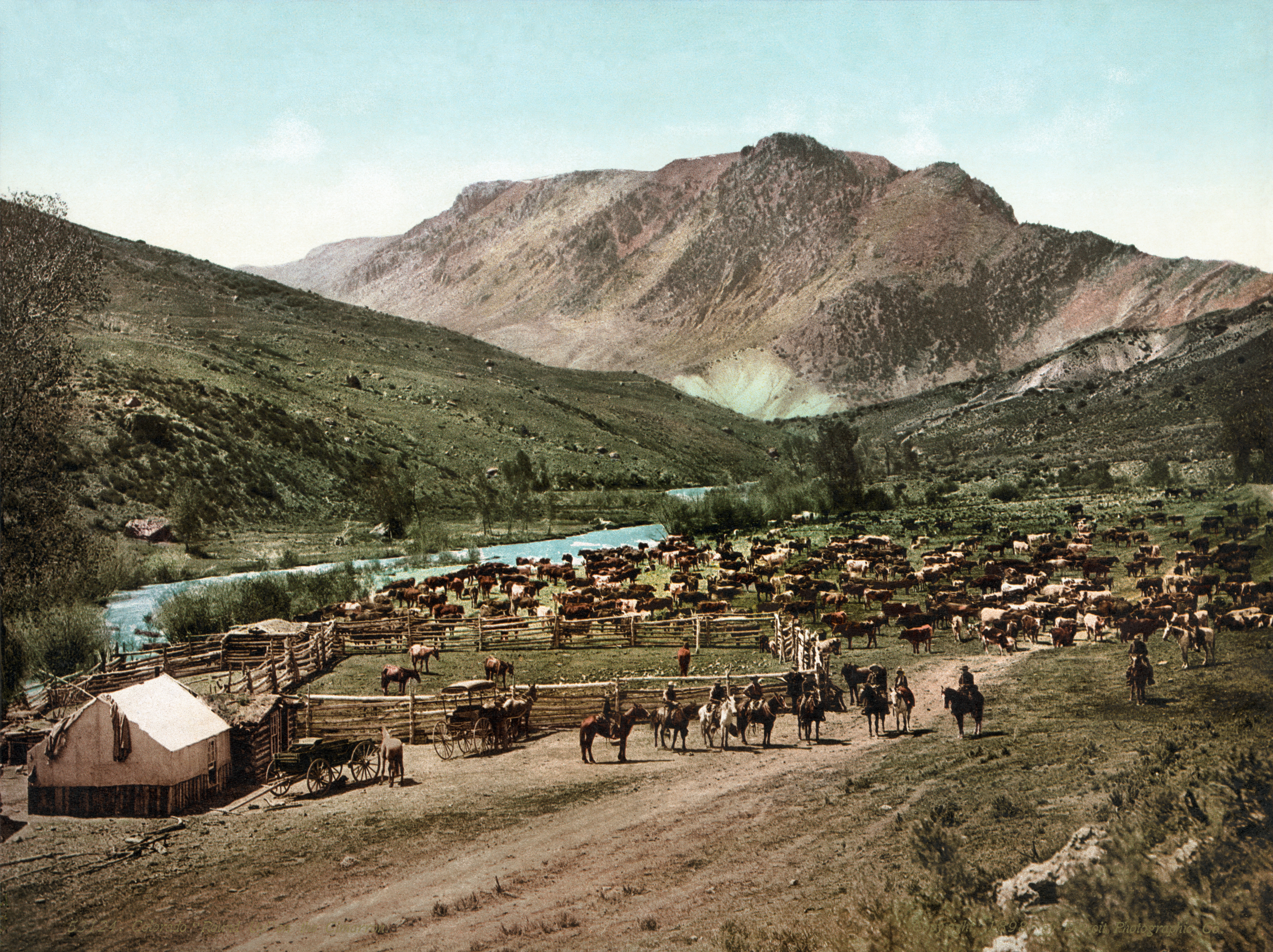
Cimarron, Colorado c. 1898

== Later life ==
After the events at Blue Mountain and Cline's acquittal, Cline did not find himself short of controversy. In 1881, a man died on his ranch in pursuit of medical treatment, and Cline was publicly accused of stealing from the body. The accusation suggested Cline had regularly stole from the Utes, wagon trains and stagecoaches that crossed his land, but that "robbing from the dead is carrying larceny beyond frontier limits", even for Cline.

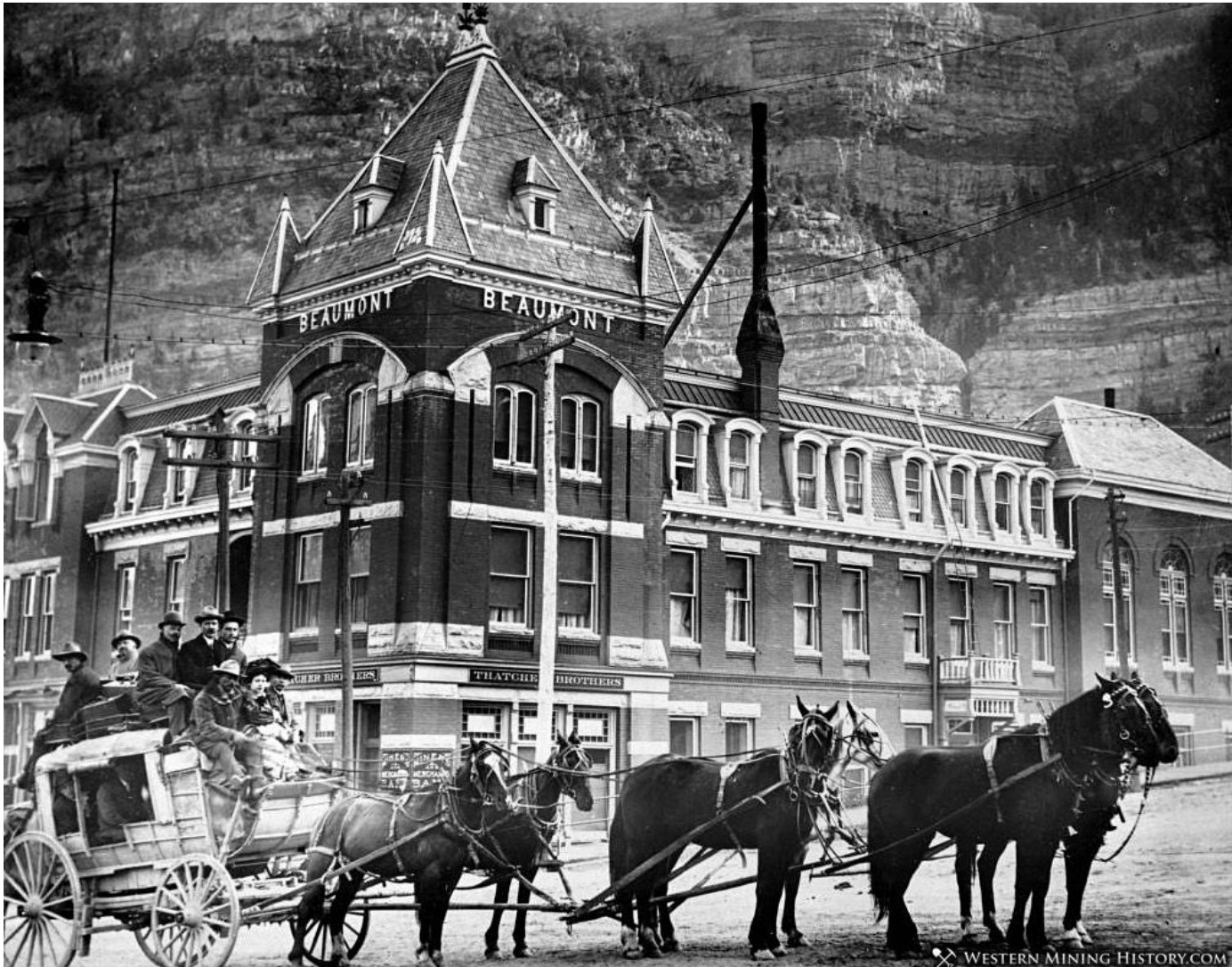
Ouray, Colorado ca. 1890

In May 1882, Cline's wife Elizabeth died of cancer. After her death, less is known about Cline's later life. He was known to be employed in carpentry for other Colorado settlers in 1899. That year, he was "chief contractor, builder and decorator" of "one of the neatest and prettiest schoolhouses in the county". In 1904, Miltion Cline was granted a pension from Washington for his Civil War service. After a short illness, Cline died on October 7, 1911, in Montrose County, Colorado. He was 86 years old. At the time, the Ouray County Plaindealer noted his death as "A famous old pioneer dead."

=== Legacy ===
Some of the land that once made up Cline's Cimarron ranch is today is part of the Curecanti National Recreation Area. The historic town of Cimarron no longer exists, but parts are preserved as "Historic Cimarron" within the recreation area. The National Park Service maintains a visitor center, campground and picnic area on the site.
