= John Tribe (Medal of Honor) =

United States Army soldier (1836–1917)

- Born: December 4, 1836; Tioga County, New York, US
- Died: December 4, 1917 (aged 81)
- Burial place: Halsey Valley Cemetery, New York
- Military career
- Allegiance: United States
- Branch: Union Army
- Rank: Sergeant
- Units: Company G, 5th New York Cavalry
- Conflicts: American Civil War
- Awards: Medal of Honor

John Tribe (December 4, 1841 – December 4, 1917) was a Union Army soldier in the American Civil War who received the U.S. military's highest decoration, the Medal of Honor.

== Personal life ==
Tribe was born just north of the Pennsylvania state line in central upstate in Barton, New York, in 1841. He was the fifth child of twelve and fourth son of English immigrants, John Tribe Sr. and Sarah Pearson. In 1850, his father was working as a laborer, but by 1860, he had become a farmer. At that time, John and his family were a farming family.

== Military service ==
=== 1861 ===
At 19, he lied about his age and enlisted as a private in Company G, 5th New York Cavalry at Oswego on August 22, 1861. With his company, he went to Camp Scott on Staten Island where the regiment was organizing. Tribe mustered into Federal service with his company on October 9.

As one of the first volunteer cavalry regiments in the state, the regiment was organized into three battalions of four companies making a total of twelve companies. By the end of October 1861, the regiment included 50 officers and 1,064 enlisted men. Two of the regiment's three battalions received horses during October. On November 18, the regiment moved by train to Baltimore, where the Third Battalion received its horses and equipment. On November 25, as a mounted trooper, Tribe marched with his regiment to Annapolis. They established a winter quarters camp nearby (Camp Harris) where more drills were conducted.

While Tribe was in Annapolis, his two older brothers, Pierson and William enlisted in the 64th New York Infantry. Pierson enlisted as a private in Company H an William enlisted as a Wagoner. Neither would survive the war.

=== 1862 ===
In March, Tribe and his regiment were sent to join Bank's V Corps in the Shenandoah Valley. They fought against Jackson's army. While his regiment was recovering in Williamsport, his brother William was killed at the Battle of Fair Oaks. In July, Bank's V Corps became II Corps of Pope's Army of Virginia during the Northern Virginia Campaign. On August 24 and 25, the regiment was involved in the First Battle of Rappahannock Station where Corporal Tribe helped destroy Waterloo Bridge while under enemy fire on August 25. The action forced Jackson to cross the river further upstream, unfortunately keeping Pope unaware of Jackson's location.

During the Second Battle of Bull Run, Tribe and his company acted as escorts for Pope's headquarters. After the defeat, Tribe and his regiment spent the next six months in the defenses of Washington and ranging from there to the Blue Ridge Mountains in anti-guerilla warfare against, among others, Mosby's Rangers, who were under the command of John S. Mosby.

=== 1863 ===
In April 1863, the regiment became part of the 3rd Brigade, Stahel's Cavalry Division, XXII Army Corps. On May 3, the 5th New York faced Mosby again—this time at Warrenton Junction. About 40 men from the regiment, led by Major Hammond, surprised Mosby's men after they had surprised a detachment of about 100 men from the 1st (West) Virginia Cavalry. Most of Mosby's prisoners were rescued, and Mosby had significant losses.

Tribe and his regiment were soon swept up in the Gettysburg campaign. In early June, his cavalry division detached from Washington to the Army of the Potomac (AoP) to counter Lee's Army of Northern Virginia. On June 28, the army was reorganized, and the cavalry division became the 3rd Division of the Cavalry Corps, AoP. Brig. Gen. Hugh J. Kilpatrick was the new division's commander, and the division was detached eastward as the army moved from Frederick, Maryland, to Pennsylvania.

At the Battle of Hanover on June 30, Tribe's regiment was the penultimate in line of march when the rear regiment was attacked by rebel cavalry under Maj. Gen J.E.B. Stuart. After close fighting, the Confederates withdrew to the cover of their artillery in the hills leaving the streets full of dead and wounded men and horses. Tribe's brigade and Custer's Second Brigade counterattacked, silencing the Confederate artillery, and Stuart's men were driven toward Lee's army. The 5th New York had one officer killed and one officer wounded. Casualties for enlisted men were more numerous: 4 killed, 29 wounded, and 18 became prisoners.

Tribe, now a sergeant, was with the regiment at Gettysburg where it guarded the left wing of the army, about 2.5 miles (4.0 km) from Gettysburg south of Little Round Top. After the Battle of Gettysburg, during Lee's retreat, the 5th New York Cavalry suffered significant casualties on July 6 in the Battle of Williamsport (also known as Battle of Hagerstown) in Hagerstown, Maryland, (near the road to Williamsport) where with the 1st Vermont Cavalry, the two regiments were flanked on both sides, outnumbered, and eventually driven back. Tribe's unit had 2 officers wounded and 3 officers captured, and 3 enlisted men killed, 8 wounded, and 54 captured. Tribe's command skirmished at Hagerstown again on July 11. After Lee's army crossed the Potomac on July 14, the AoP eventually crossed back to Virginia, and Tribe's division was posted near Warrenton where it saw no contact until a skirmish at Ashby's Gap on July 26.

For the Bristoe campaign beginning October 10, Tribe's regiment was in the First Brigade of Kilpatrick's 3rd Division commanded by Brigadier General Henry E. Davies. After initial success, portions of Kilpatrick's division were partially surrounded on October 19 in the Battle of Buckland Mills. Without the brigade's skill and daring, the "entire command would have been annihilated," and the Union cavalry escaped with Tribe's unit fighting off attacking infantry. The next month, in the Mine Run Campaign (began November 26), Brig. Gen. George A. Custer replaced Davies who remained in command of 1st Brigade. The regiment faced artillery duels and cold, wet weather, and one of its battalions held off the enemy at Raccoon Ford for six days.

On December 3, 1863, the regiment set up camp near Stevensburg, Virginia.

=== 1864 ===
On January 1, Corp. Tribe re-enlisted in the 5th New York at Stevensburg.

On February 28, 1864, detachments from the 2nd New York, 5th New York, 1st Vermont, 1st Maine, and 5th Michigan departed Stevensburg, for a special mission under the command of Colonel Ulric Dahlgren and consisted of 400 men. The detachment from Tribe's regiment were 40 men from companies I and K. Kilpatrick's main Union force (with Tribe and the rest of his regiment) would attack Richmond from the north as a diversion, while Dahlgren's command approached from the south. Dahlgren's goal was to liberate prisoners in several prisons (including Libby Prison), destroy mills and warehouses, destroy railroad communications, and capture artillery at Frederick Hall Station on the Virginia Central Railroad. The mission failed and Dahlgren was killed. This failed mission became known as Kilpatrick's Raid or Dahlgren's Raid. There was some controversy over some papers allegedly found on Dahlgren's body that discussed killing Jefferson Davis and burning Richmond. However, both Meade and Kilpatrick said nothing like that was "authorized, sanctioned, or approved".

During March, Ulysses S. Grant became commander of all Union armed forces. Although Grant decided not to replace Meade as commander of the Army of the Potomac, he kept his headquarters with Meade's and provided direction. Philip Sheridan was appointed commander of Meade's cavalry corps. Kilpatrick was assigned to a larger command out west, and he was replaced as commander of Sheridan's 3rd Division by General James H. Wilson. Colonel John B. McIntosh replaced Davies as commander of the cavalry division's First Brigade—which consisted of the 18th Pennsylvania, 1st Connecticut, 2nd New York, and 5th New York cavalries.

At the Battle of the Wilderness, on May 4, as the Cavalry Division moved on the Plank Road toward Chancellorsville, the 5th was detached and sent down the Orange Plank Road to Parker's Store to guard an approach from the west. The next day, as the remainder of the division moved southward, it patrolled the area. While the regiment ate breakfast at Parker's Store, Company I probed west and made contact with Confederate infantry. In dismounted skirmishing, the company, joined by the regiment, discovered it was fighting Hill's entire infantry corps. Tribe's regiment, only about 500 men, fought dismounted in a skirmish line using their Spencer carbines' greater firepower in a slow, delaying retreat east beyond the Orange Plank Road until relieved by infantry from Getty's 2nd Division of VI Corps. Nearly out of ammunition, Tribe's regiment was sent about 1 mile (1.6 km) to the rear to resupply after a desperate five-hour engagement against a much larger force suffering significant casualties. This delaying action prevented Hill from cutting off Hancock's II Corps, and the fire from the Spencers led the Confederates to believe they had been fighting an entire brigade. The Wilderness continued through May 7 and finished as a draw. For the next two weeks, the fighting shifted southeast toward Spotsylvania Court House. On May 7, the regiment guarded Germania Plank Road. Although the regiment's casualties for Spotsylvania were few, the two battles' combined casualties were the regiment's third highest in the American Civil War.

In the Battle of Cold Harbor, which lasted May 31 through June 12, the 5th New York was at Ashland Station on the Virginia Central Railroad to destroy two railroad bridges over the North Anna River. The fighting was fierce and part of the First Brigade was temporarily surrounded before fighting its way to safety. In this portion of the battle, losses for both sides were heavy.

On June 22, Tribe's regiment went on the Wilson-Kautz Raid to "cut the enemy's lines of communication south." Wilson's division used lesser-traveled roads to move south and west to "avoid the observation of the enemy", and targets included the rail line that ran from Petersburg to Lynchburg and the Richmond and Danville Railroad. By June 26, the force could not capture the Staunton River bridge near Roanoke Station, and could not continue southward along the rail line. On the return trip, Wilson lost two battles and found his path back blocked by Confederate troops. In the desperate escape, artillery was spiked, supply wagons burned, and ambulances were abandoned with wounded that would become prisoners. A Confederate infantry attack caused Tribe's half of the raid under Kautz to become separated from Wilson. Some men did not reach the safety of Union lines until July 8. The failed 350-mile raid destroyed some railroad track but cost 1,445 casualties out of a force of 5,500 men. The regiment rested and regrouped for several days in early July. Many men were sent to hospitals, and almost 100 men had no horse. The dismounted men were sent to a camp in the District of Columbia and eventually fought at Maryland Heights, Rockville, Toll Gate, Poolesville, Snicker's Ferry, and Kernstown.

Beginning in August, Tribe fought in Sheridan's Shenandoah Valley Campaign. On August 13, Tribe's regiment proceeded through Leesburg and Snicker's Gap and reached Sheridan's Army of the Shenandoah near Opequon Creek about 2 miles (3.2 km) from Winchester after travelling about 75 miles (121 km) in 22 hours. The regiment was in the Battle of Summit Point on August 21 but did not have multiple casualties until the "furious fighting" at Kearneysville Station on August 25. Skirmishing for the next few weeks was at Berryville and Opequon Creek. At the Battle of Opequon, or the Third Battle of Winchester, a Union victory on September 19, Tribe's regiment followed the 2nd New York leading the initial advance in this battle during which it made five charges, including four against infantry. The regiment spent the next few days pursuing Confederates while having few casualties. In early October, Custer replaced Wilson as division commander as it retreated down the valley burning anything the Confederate army could use. Enemy cavalry attacks on the rear guard led Sheridan to order Torbert to "whip the rebel cavalry or get whipped himself". Torbert had Merritt's 1st Division to attack Lomax's cavalry and Custer's 3rd to attack Rosser. On October 9, near Toms Brook, Custer personally led the Tribe's unit in a highly successful attack leading to victory and causing a quick Confederate retreat some called the "Woodstock Races".

The Battle of Cedar Creek, on October 19, with over 47,000 participants began when Early's Confederate army surprised Sheridan's army while Sheridan was away in Winchester, driving back Crook's VIII and Emory's XIX Corps. Sheridan returned and rallied his army. Custer's 3rd Division attacked from the right preventing enemy cavalry from outflanking the aremy's line. Tribe's unit performed well in this battle, capturing 22 artillery pieces, 14 caissons, 24 wagons and ambulances, 83 sets of artillery harnesses, 75 sets of wagon harnesses, 98 horses, and 67 mules.

The regiment spent the next month on reconnaissance and picket duty. Major Boice took command on October 20. The regiment became Sheridan's escort on December 1. On December 14 Sheridan was escorted to his new headquarters in Winchester where Tribe's regiment constructed its winter quarters.

=== 1865 ===
Beginning February 27, Sheridan moved his army south along the Valley Pike. On March 2, Sheridan's 1st and 3rd divisions destroyed Early's Confederate army in the Battle of Waynesboro. Most of Early's army was killed or captured, although Early evaded capture. Tribe's division did the fighting, and all of Early's headquarters equipment and artillery were captured. After the battle, while a few men remained with Sheridan as he returned to Grant, Tribe remained with the bulk of the regiment as part of a force that escorted about 1,400 prisoners 100 miles (160 km) north to Winchester, joined by several of the army's depleted regiments and dismounted men. The escort totaled about 1,200 from the 1st and 3rd Divisions.

During the trip north, Tribe, now Company G Quartermaster-Sergeant, was in the rear guard with his regiment when, on March 7, near Rude's Hill, Rosser's cavalry attacked it. (Note: Boudrye spells Rude's Hill as "Rood's Hill". A map at the Library of Congress uses the "Rude's Hill" spelling.) A counterattack drove off the Confederates in hand-to-hand fighting and numerous Confederates were killed and 35 were captured. The Union force and all prisoners arrived at Winchester on March 7. On March 13, the regiment went on its the last combat patrol to Berryville. On April 9, when Lee surrendered at Appomattox, Tribe was in Winchester. In early May, his regiment went from Staunton to Lexington and captured former Virginia Governor John Letcher. Tribe spent most of June in Winchester.

On July 18, Colonel White, commanding the regiment, notified the regiment that it would leave on the next day to New York City to muster out. July 19 is the official muster out date for the 5th New York Cavalry. However, the regiment camped on Hart's Island in New York beginning July 20. On July 25, Tribe received his pay and departed for home.

== Medal of Honor citation ==
The President of the United States of America, in the name of Congress, takes pleasure in presenting the Medal of Honor to Private John Tribe, United States Army, for extraordinary heroism on 25 August 1862, while serving with Company G, 5th New York Cavalry, in action at Waterloo Bridge, Virginia. Private Tribe voluntarily assisted in the burning and destruction of the bridge under heavy fire of the enemy.

== Post war ==
Tribe returned to Tioga where the 23-year-old returned to the family farm. With the loss of his two brothers in the war, he was the oldest surviving son. In 1866, he married Sarah Esther Gilkey, in 1867, had a daughter named Flora Belle Tribe, (Note: Flora would marry Charles Atchison in 1888 and die in childbirth on July 4, 1888, survived by her spouse and daughter, Flora, who lived until 1962.) and by the 1870 census, he was working as a blacksmith in Barton. Ten years later, he had his own farm and another daughter, Ellene.

In 1888, his eldest daughter died in childbirth. On June 15, 1896, his wife Sarah died.

In the ongoing review of official records in the 1890s, he was nominated for his actions in 1862. His Medal of Honor was issued on June 11, 1895.

Two years later, the 55-year-old widower married again to 51-year-old Emma Josephine Allington on July 14, 1897, in Nichols, NY. He continued farming in his community for the next 15 years. He was a member of the Grand Army of the Republic, Post 529. Again, Tribe was widowed on July 13, 1913. Tribe wed for a third time on May 31, 1916, when the 74-year-old retired farmer married the 55-year-old widowed nurse, Ella Morgan.

Tribe died on his 81st birthday, on December 4, 1917.

== See also ==
- 5th New York Cavalry Regiment
- New York in the Civil War
