= Three Chopt Road Historic District =

Historic district in Virginia, United States

- U.S. National Register of Historic Places
- U.S. Historic district
- Virginia Landmarks Register
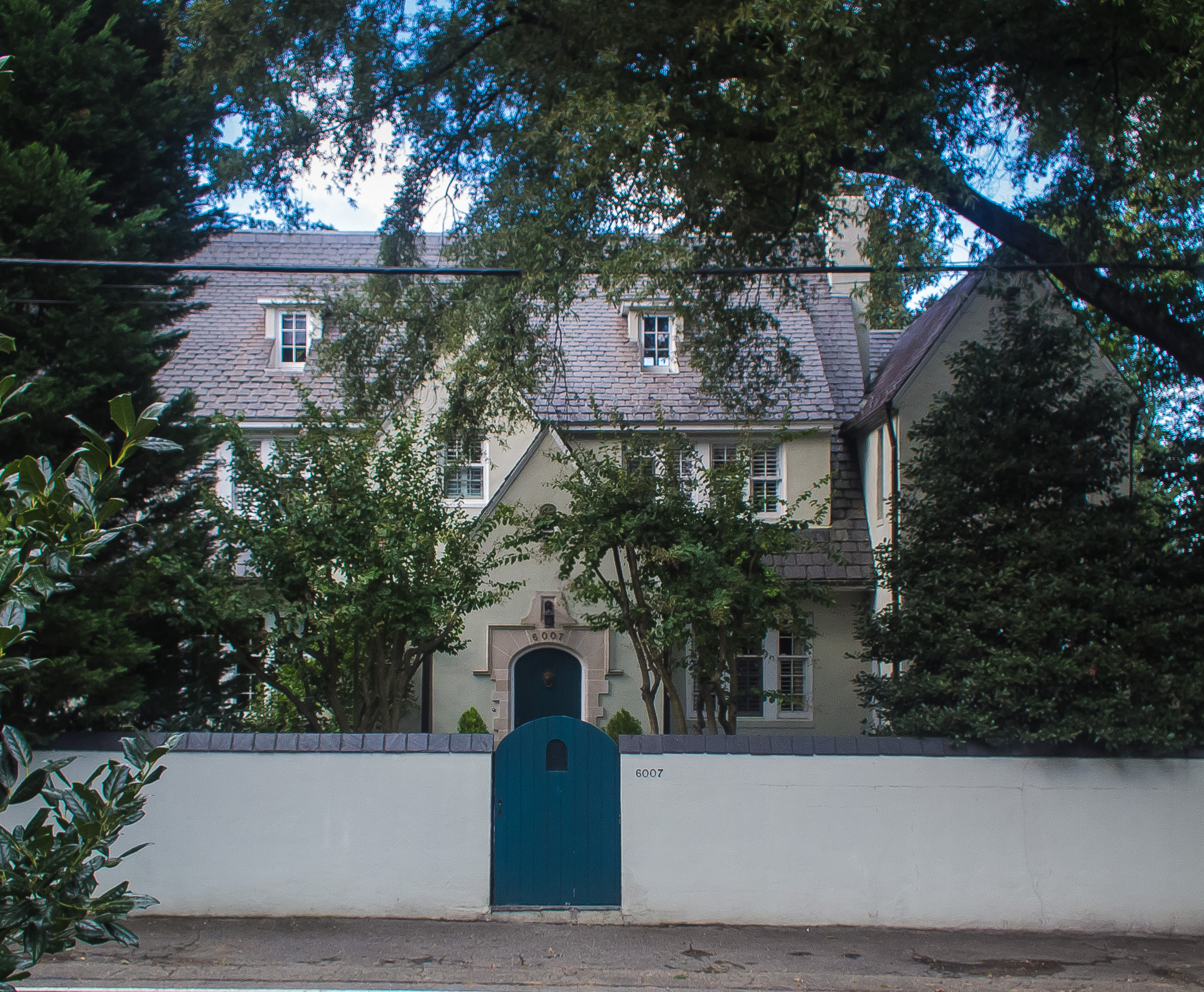
- Residence in the Three Chopt Road Historic District, September 2013

- Location within Virginia Location within the United States
- Location: Three Chopt Rd. from Cary St. to Bandy Rd., Richmond, Virginia
- Coordinates: 37°34′43″N 77°31′35″W
- Area: 65 acres (26 ha)
- Built: c. 1890
- Architect: Lee, W. Duncan; Noland & Baskervill, et al.
- Architectural style: Late 19th And 20th Century Revivals, Late 19th And Early 20th Century American Movements, et al.
- NRHP reference No.: 12000520
- VLR No.: 127-6064

Significant dates
- Added to NRHP: August 14, 2012
- Designated VLR: June 21, 2012

The Three Chopt Road Historic District is a national historic district located at Richmond, Virginia. The district encompasses 90 contributing buildings, 4 contributing sites, and 4 contributing structures located west of downtown Richmond. The primarily residential area developed starting in the early-20th century as one of the city's early "streetcar suburbs." The buildings are in a variety of popular late-19th and early-20th century architectural styles including frame bungalows, Colonial Revival, Tudor Revival, and Mission Revival. There are a remarkable group of unusually large, architect-designed houses and churches. Notable non-residential buildings include St. Bridget's Catholic Church (1950) and St. Stephen's Episcopal Church. Located in the district is the separately listed Green's Farm (Huntley).

It was added to the National Register of Historic Places in 2012.
