= Stevensville, Virginia =

Unincorporated community in Virginia, United States

- Unincorporated community
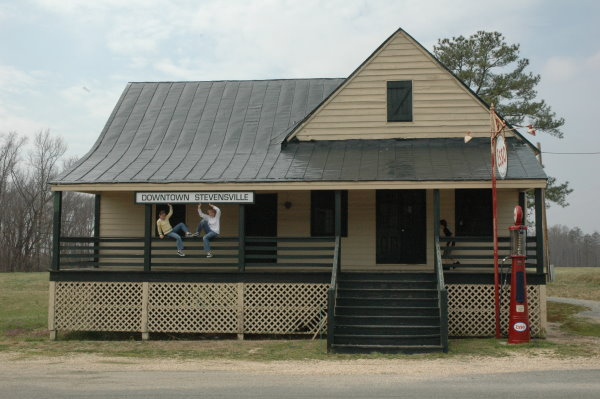

- Location within the Commonwealth of Virginia Stevensville (the United States)
- Coordinates: 37°43′41″N 76°55′11″W
- Country: United States
- State: Virginia
- County: King and Queen
- Time zone: UTC−5 (Eastern (EST))
  - Summer (DST): UTC−4 (EDT)
- ZIP code: 23161
- Area code: 804

Stevensville is an unincorporated community in King and Queen County, Virginia, United States. The community is an agricultural community located along Virginia State Route 14, east of Bruington and St. Stephens Church. In 1864, Union Army colonel Ulric Dahlgren was killed during an assassination attempt against Confederate President Jefferson Davis and his cabinet near Stevensville at a junction known as Dahlgrens Corner since at least 1918. It is at the intersection of Virginia State Route 631 and Virginia State Route 632.
