= Battle of Walkerton =

Battle of the American Civil War

Coordinates: 37°42′33″N 76°55′29″W

- Part of the American Civil War
Date	March 2, 1864
Location	Walkerton, King and Queen County, Virginia
Result	Confederate victory

Belligerents
United States of America (Union)	(Confederate States of America) CSA (Confederacy)

Commanders and leaders
Hugh Judson Kilpatrick; Ulric Dahlgren †	Wade Hampton

Strength
4,000	

The Battle of Walkerton was an engagement of the American Civil War. It occurred March 2, 1864, in Walkerton, King and Queen County, Virginia during the Kilpatrick-Dahlgren Raid.

The campaign started with Brig. Gen. Hugh Judson Kilpatrick leaving Stevensburg on February 28 with 4,000 men, intending to raid Richmond. The force rode along the Virginia Central Railroad tearing up track, while an advance force was sent south along the James River. The plan was that the advance force, led by Col. Ulric Dahlgren, son of Rear Admiral John Dahlgren, should penetrate Richmond's defenses from the rear, and release prisoners at Belle Isle. Yet, when Kilpatrick reached Richmond on March 1, Dahlgren had not yet arrived. Kilpatrick had to withdraw because he was under pursuit by Confederate cavalry, led by Maj. Gen. Wade Hampton. Hampton caught up with Kilpatrick near Old Church on March 2, but the Federals were able to take refuge with elements of Butler's command at New Kent Court House.

Meanwhile, Dahlgren had found himself unable to penetrate Richmond's defenses, and tried to escape northwards. The group became separated, and on March 2, Dahlgren, along with about 100 men, was ambushed by a detachment of the 9th Virginia Cavalry and Home Guards in King and Queen County near Walkerton. Dahlgren was killed with several of his men and most of the rest were captured.

The gravest implications of the raid came as a result of papers found on Dahlgren's body. The papers allegedly contained an official Union order to burn Richmond and assassinate Jefferson Davis and his cabinet. An angry mob disinterred Dahlgren's remains and put them on display in Richmond. Meade, Kilpatrick, and Lincoln all disavowed any knowledge of the Dahlgren Papers, and their authenticity has been disputed. At the time, however, the affair caused a great public outcry among Southerners, who accused the North of initiating "a war of extermination."
