= 3rd Indiana Cavalry Regiment =

3rd Indiana Cavalry Regiment 45th Indiana Infantry Regiment
- A detachment of 3rd Indiana Cavalry Regiment in Petersburg, Virginia.
- Active: August 22, 1861 - August 7, 1865
- Engagements: American Civil War: Northern Virginia Campaign; Second Battle of Bull Run; Battle of Chantilly; Maryland Campaign; Battle of South Mountain; Battle of Antietam; Battle of Fredericksburg; Mud March (American Civil War); First Battle of Rappahannock Station; Chancellorsville Campaign; Stoneman's 1863 Raid; Battle of Brandy Station; Battle of Gettysburg; Second Battle of Rappahannock Station; Battle of Morton's Ford; Mine Run Campaign; Dahlgren Affair; Overland Campaign; Battle of the Wilderness; Battle of Ground Squirrel Church; Battle of Yellow Tavern; Battle of Cold Harbor; Battle of Totopotomoy Creek; Battle of Salem Church; Battle of Haw's Shop; Siege of Petersburg; Second Battle of Ream's Station; Wilson–Kautz Raid; Valley Campaigns of 1864; Third Battle of Winchester; Appomattox Campaign; Battle of Dinwiddie Court House; Battle of Five Forks; Battle of Sailor's Creek; Battle of Appomattox Station; Battle of Appomattox Court House; Grand Review of the Armies

Commanders
- Notable commanders: Colonel George Henry Chapman

The 3rd Indiana Cavalry Regiment, also designated the 45th Indiana Infantry Regiment or the 45th Indiana Volunteers was a military unit from the U.S. state of Indiana that participated in the American Civil War. It consisted of two separate "wings" or battalions that were separated for much of the regiments service.

== Service ==
George Henry Chapman, one of the prominent officers of the 3rd Indiana Cavalry Regiment. Chapman went on to command a cavalry brigade following the Battle of Gettysburg.

The 3rd Indiana Cavalry Regiment "East Wing" or "Right Wing" consisted of Companies A, B, C, D, E, and F, which were organized at Madison, Indiana on August 22, 1861, that were intended for service with the 1st Indiana Cavalry Regiment. On October 22, 1861, the six companies were designated as part of the 3rd Indiana Cavalry Regiment and assigned to the Army of the Potomac in the Eastern Theater of the war. The East Wing saw action at the Battle of Antietam and fought with distinction at the Battle of Gettysburg, where in the opening day's action on July 1, 1863, the unit held off far larger Confederate forces until the main Union force arrived.

The 3rd Indiana Cavalry Regiment "West Wing" or "Left Wing" consisted of Companies G, H, I, K, L and M. The first four companies were organized at Madison, Indiana on October 1, 1861. In December 1861 the companies were assigned to the Army of the Ohio. Company L was organized in October 1862, and Company M, organized in December 1862, both companies L and M later joined the unit in Eastern Tennessee. The West Wing saw action at the Battle of Chickamauga. In December 1864, the West Wing companies were transferred to the 8th Indiana Cavalry Regiment.

Original Organization of Regiment
Company	Primary Place of Recruitment	Earliest Captain
A	Switzerland County	Jacob S. Buchanan
B	Harrison County	James D. Irvin
C	Switzerland County	Theophilus M. Danglade
D	Dearborn County	Daniel B. Keister
E	Jefferson County	William Simrall McClure
F	Union County	Patrick Carland
G	Johnson County	Felix W. Graham
H	Clinton County	Alfred Gaddis
I	Henry County	Will C. Moreau
K	Switzerland County	Robert Klein
L	No cities or counties given	Oliver M. Powers
M	No cities or counties given	Charles U. Patton

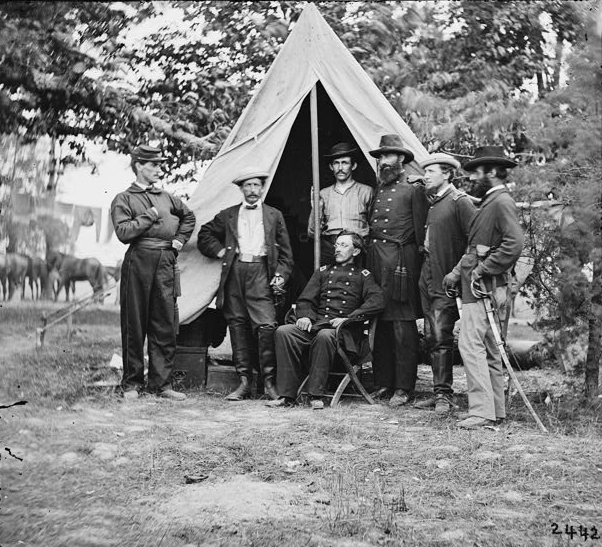
Col. George Henry Chapman and his staff of the 3rd Regiment Indiana Cavalry (East Wing) on duty with the Army of the Potomac.

== Casualties ==
The regiment lost a total of 148 men during its service: 2 Officers, and 146 Enlisted men.

== Commanders ==
- Scott Carter: October 21, 1861 - March 11, 1863 (resigned commission).
- George Henry Chapman: March 12, 1863 - July 21, 1864.

== Notable people ==
- William Nimon Pickerill: Originally from Brown County, Ohio Pickerill served as a private in Company F. Pickerill later wrote a book on the official history of the 3rd Indiana Cavalry Regiment in 1906 titled History of the Third Indiana Cavalry. Pickerill is buried at Crown Hill Cemetery.

== Memorials ==
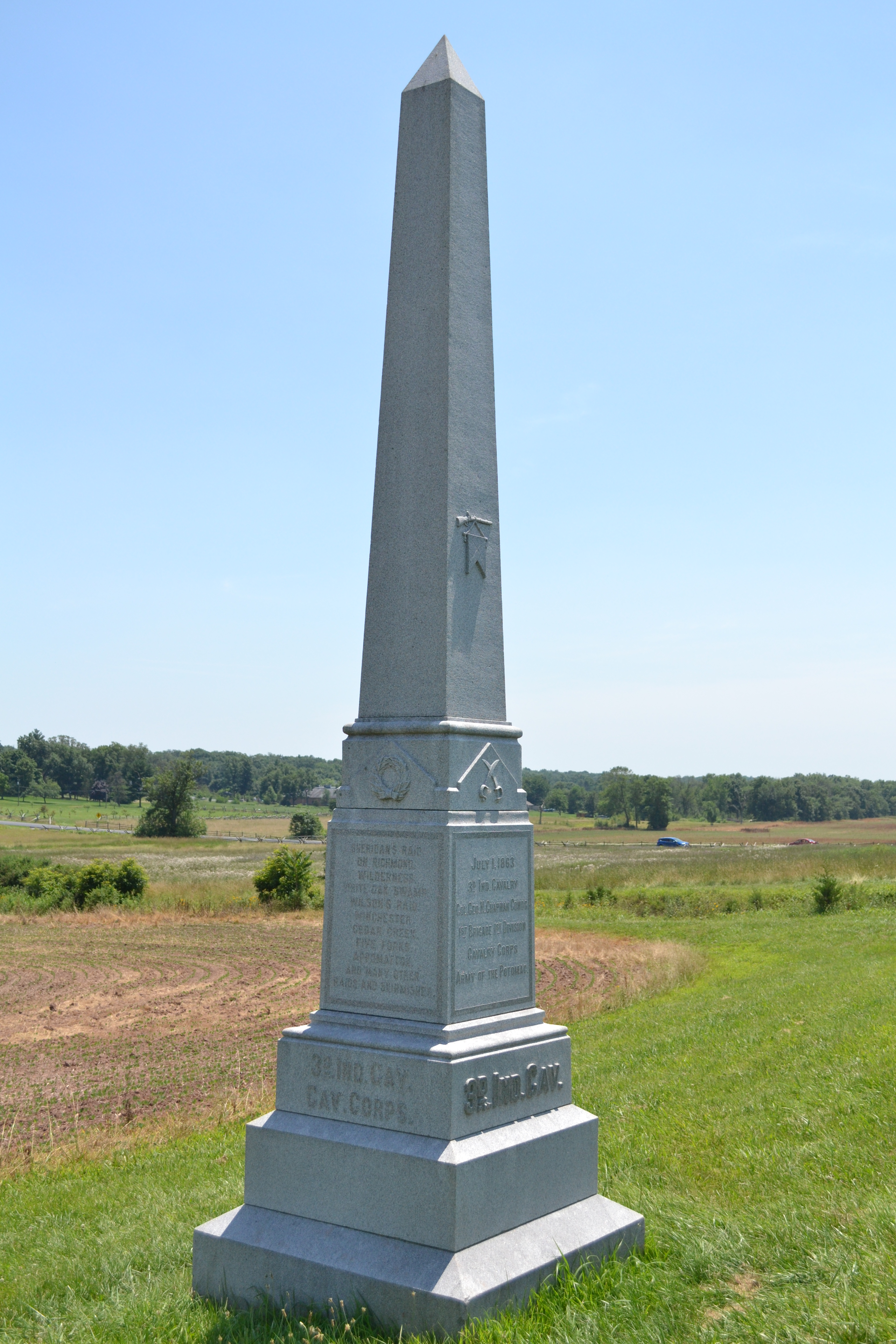
The 3rd Indiana Cavalry marker at Gettysburg.

A memorial for the 3rd Indiana Cavalry Regiment stands at the Gettysburg Battlefield at North Reynolds Avenue.

== See also ==
- Indiana in the Civil War
- List of Indiana Civil War regiments
