= Green's Farm (Huntley) =

Historic house in Virginia, United States

- U.S. National Register of Historic Places
- Virginia Landmarks Register
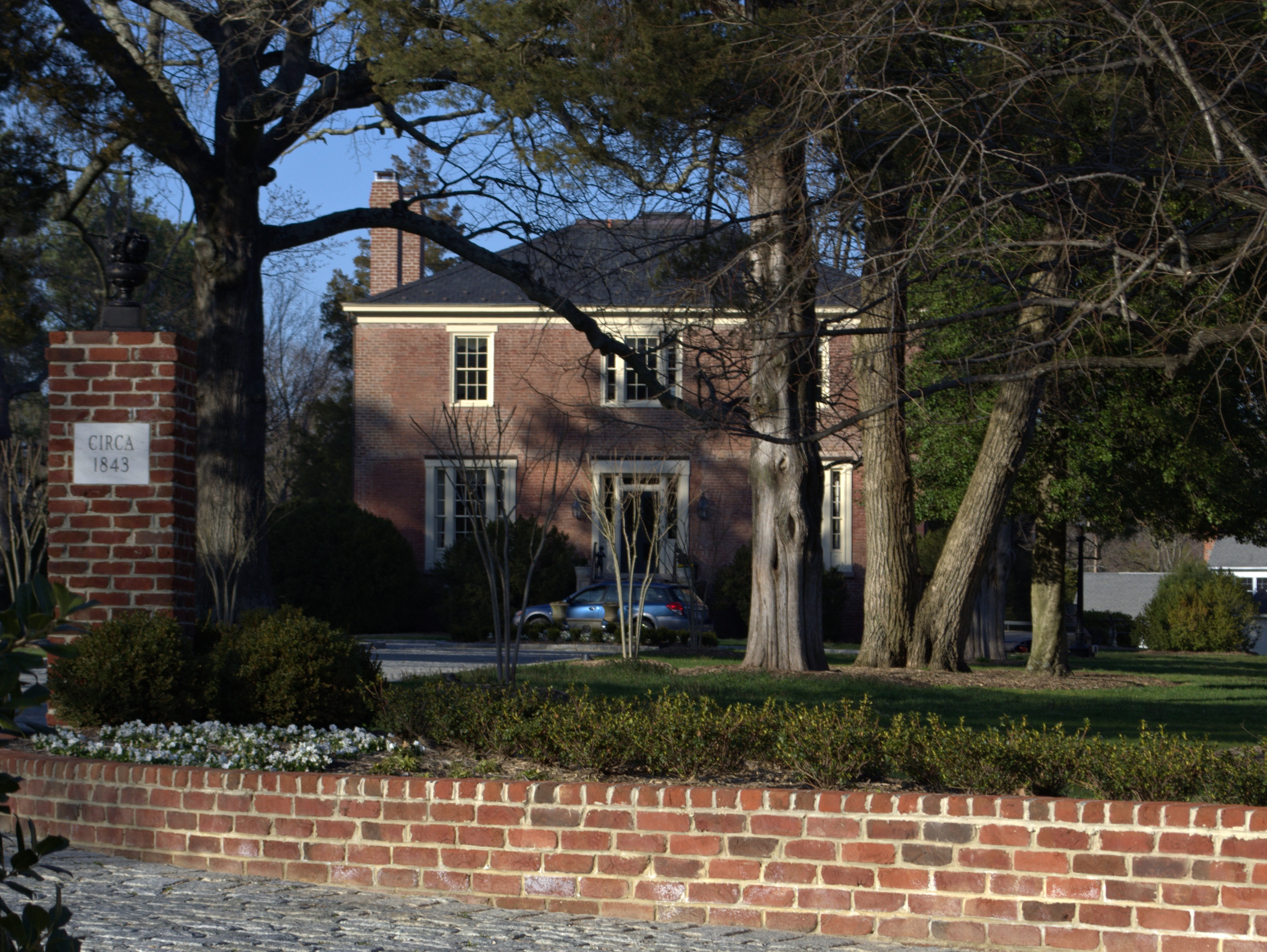
- Green's Farm House, March 2013

- Location within Virginia Location within the United States
- Location: 6510 Three Chopt Rd., Richmond, Virginia
- Coordinates: 37.58259°N 77.52942°W
- Area: 3.8 acres (1.5 ha)
- Built: 1843
- NRHP reference No.: 05001228
- VLR No.: 127-6141

Significant dates
- Added to NRHP: November 9, 2005
- Designated VLR: September 14, 2005

Green's Farm (Huntley), also known as Roselawn, is a historic estate located in Richmond, Virginia. The original section of the main house was built between 1843 and 1846, and is a two-story, three-bay, brick dwelling with a slate-covered hipped roof. It has additions built in 1906 and about 1977. Also on the property are the contributing kitchen (c. 1846), well house (c. 1846), and ice house. During the American Civil War, the original portion of the house was used as a field hospital and saw some action in March 1864 during Dahlgren's Raid.

It was added to the National Register of Historic Places in 2005.
