= George Henry Chapman =

American sailor, editor, lawyer, and writer

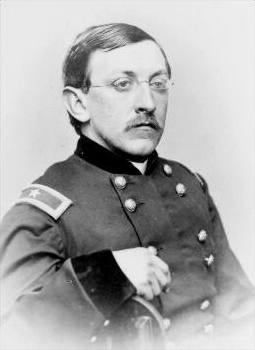
- Born: November 22, 1832; Holland, Massachusetts, US
- Died: June 16, 1882 (aged 49) near Indianapolis, Indiana, US
- Burial place: Crown Hill Cemetery and Arboretum, Section 6, Lot 12; 39.8201243°N 86.1746721°W
- Military career
- Allegiance: United States; Union
- Branch: United States Navy; Union Army
- Service years: 1847–1850 (USN); 1861–1866 (Union Army)
- Rank: Midshipman (USN); Brigadier General; Brevet Major General (Union Army)
- Conflicts: Mexican–American War; American Civil War

George Henry Chapman (November 22, 1832 – June 16, 1882) was an American sailor, newspaper editor, lawyer, and soldier. He served in the United States Navy during the Mexican–American War and as a Union Army general during the American Civil War. Later in life he was a judge and a state legislator.

== Early life and career ==
Chapman was born in Holland, Massachusetts, in 1832. At the age of six, Chapman and his family moved to Indiana. His father and uncle published newspapers in Terre Haute and then in Indianapolis, including Indiana State Sentinel, a pro-democratic newspaper. Chapman later studied at Marion County Seminary.

In 1847 Chapman was appointed to the U. S. Navy as a midshipman. He served on the frigates USS Cumberland and USS Constitution until 1850, when he resigned following the death of his uncle. He then had a short-lived career in the mercantile business, and afterward he studied law. Chapman was admitted to the bar in 1857. From 1854–55, he edited and published his own newspaper called the Indiana Republican. He became the assistant clerk to the U.S. House of Representatives in 1860.

== Civil War service ==
At the beginning of the American Civil War in 1861, he resigned his clerk position to volunteer in the Union Army. On November 2 he was commissioned a major in the 3rd Indiana Cavalry. Chapman briefly led the cavalry division of the Army of the Ohio in May of the following year. Transferring to the infantry, he commanded a brigade in the Army of the Potomac until June 27, 1862.

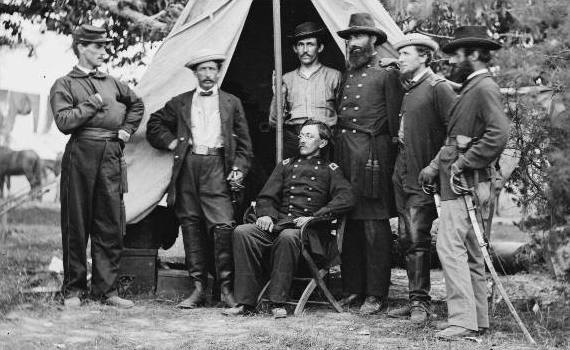
Chapman (seated) and his staff during the American Civil War

Chapman was promoted to lieutenant colonel on October 25, 1862. He fought at the Second Battle of Bull Run in August, the Battle of Antietam in September, and the Battle of Fredericksburg in December. On March 12, 1863, Chapman was promoted to colonel, and that May he participated in the Battle of Chancellorsville.

Returning to the cavalry service, Chapman led his regiment during the Battle of Gettysburg in July 1863. Here his command was part of Col. Thomas C. Devin's brigade, and was noted as the first Union soldiers to engage Confederate forces approaching Gettysburg via the Cashtown road. Shortly after the battle, Chapman was given brigade command in the cavalry of the Army of the Potomac until March 1864.

Chapman participated in the Valley Campaigns of 1864 against Confederate Lt. Gen. Jubal Early's forces, lasting from May to October. He was promoted to the rank of brigadier general on July 21, 1864, to rank from that date. Chapman led a cavalry brigade in the Union Army of the Shenandoah from August 6 until September 19, when he was wounded during the Third Battle of Winchester. Recovered by the following month, Chapman resumed leading a cavalry brigade in the Shenandoah Valley.

Beginning on January 5, 1865, Chapman led a cavalry division of the Army of the Shenandoah. After the Battle of Waynesboro, Virginia, on March 2, he was ordered to remain in the Shenandoah Valley while the rest of the Union forces headed for Petersburg, Virginia. Chapman had with him now three small regiments and a few artillery pieces to hold the Valley. Beginning on April 19, 1865, he was given command of the cavalry division assigned to Washington, D.C. In recognition of his performance at Winchester in September 1864, on January 13, 1866, President Andrew Johnson nominated Chapman for appointment to the grade of brevet major general of volunteers, to rank from March 13, 1865, and the United States Senate confirmed the appointment on March 12, 1866.

== Postbellum ==
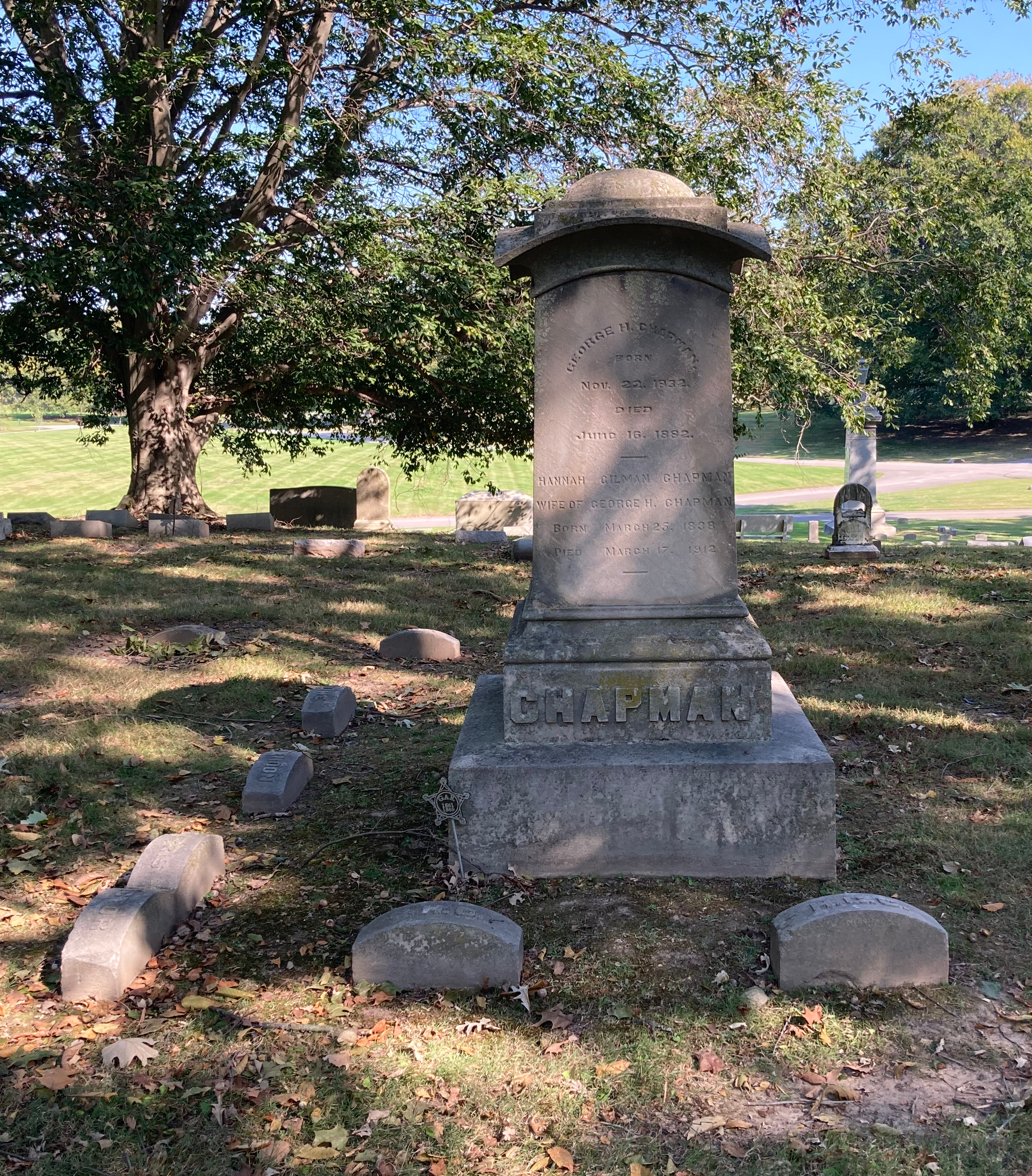
Chapman's grave at Crown Hill Cemetery

After the war, Chapman spent two months serving on court-martial boards. His military career ended with his resignation on January 7, 1866. He then served as a judge of the Criminal Court of Marion County, Indiana, for five years. He also served as receiver for two financially challenged railroads during the 1870s. He then served as a state legislator in the Indiana Senate, after being elected to the Senate in 1880. In June 1882 he died near Indianapolis and was buried at Crown Hill Cemetery located in Indianapolis (Section 6, Lot 12).

== See also ==
- List of American Civil War generals (Union)
