= Old Church, Virginia =

Unincorporated community in Virginia, United States

Coordinates: 37°38′41″N 77°13′16″W

Old Church is an unincorporated community in Hanover County in the Central Region of the U.S. state of Virginia. Formerly consisting primarily of farmland, today Old Church includes many residents who commute to jobs in the metropolitan Richmond area.

Old Church is also known for a Civil War campaign in the area. U.S. Brig. Gen. Alfred Torbert defeated C.S. Brig. Gen. Matthew C. Butler's forces, resulting in approximately 900 casualties.
