= Belle Isle (Richmond, Virginia) =

Historic place in Virginia, United States

- U.S. National Register of Historic Places
- U.S. Historic district
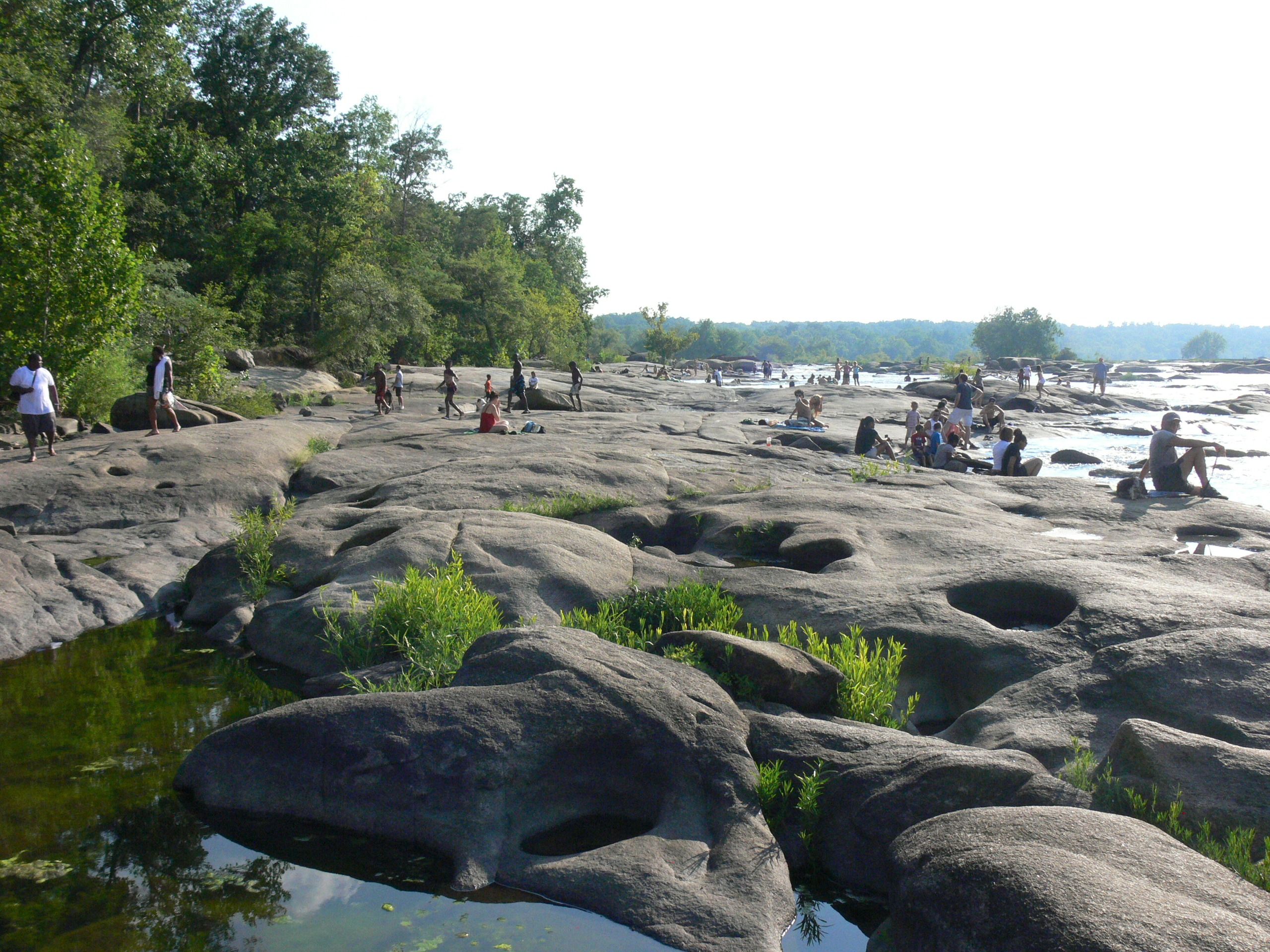
- People on the rocks of Belle Isle

- Location within Virginia Location within the United States
- Location: James R. at US 1/301, Richmond, Virginia
- Coordinates: 37.52916°N 77.45254°W
- Area: 54 acres (22 ha)
- Architectural style: Industrial Archeology
- NRHP reference No.: 95000246
- Added to NRHP: March 17, 1995

Belle Isle is a 54 acre island in the city of Richmond, Virginia on the James River, and is part of the James River Park System. It is accessible to pedestrian and bicycle traffic via a suspension footbridge that runs under the Robert E. Lee Memorial Bridge from the northern shore or via a wooden bridge from the southern shore. Except when the water level of the James is high, it is also reachable by foot from the southern shore via easy boulder-hopping. From Belle Isle, one can see Hollywood Cemetery, the old Tredegar Iron Works, and Richmond City's skyline. There are many bike trails around the island as well as a small cliff used for rock climbing instruction.

== History ==
In the 1600s, the area of Richmond, Virginia, was part of the Tsenacommacah, the homeland of the Powhatan.

Belle Isle was originally known as Broad Rock Island by the English. It was first mapped by European John Smith of Jamestown in 1607. In the 18th century the island was occupied by a fishery. In 1814, the Old Dominion Iron and Nail Company completed a nail factory. During the 1860s, the island was inhabited by a village complete with a school, church, and general store.

=== Civil War ===
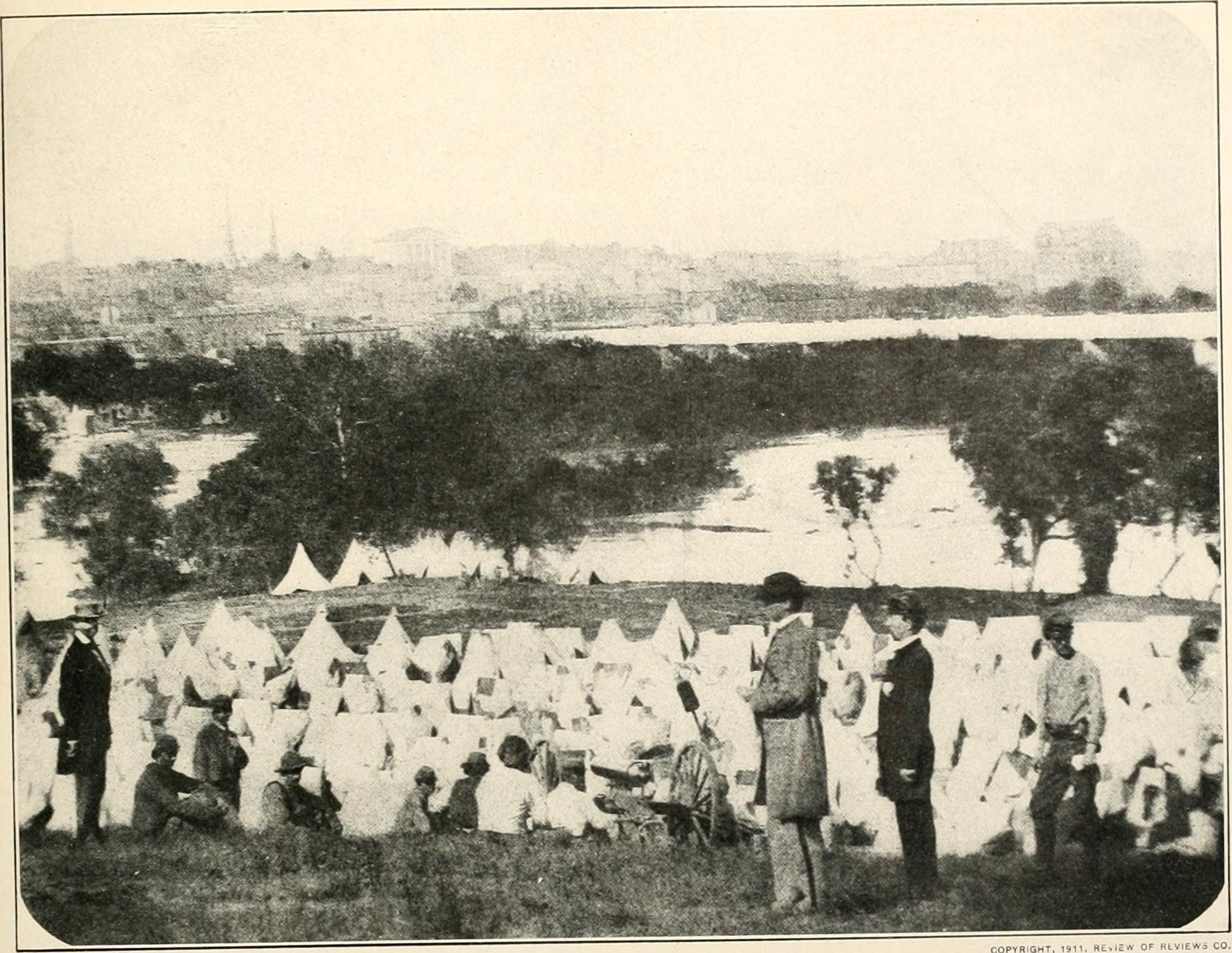
Major Thomas P. Turner (in the foreground,) commandant of Belle Isle and Libby Prison, inspects the neighbourhoods

The island served as a prison for Union soldiers during the American Civil War. Between 1862 and 1865, the island was home to about 30,000 POWs and as many as 1,000 died, though accounts vary with the South claiming the death rate was low, while the North claimed it was very high. The Battle of Walkerton was the result of a failed Union attempt to free them.

John L. Ransom, late First Sergeant Ninth Michigan Cavalry, published in 1881 his 'Andersonville Diary' which includes his account of life as a prisoner on Belle Isle during the winter of 1863-1864. He described his arrival thus:

Arrived on the morning of Nov. 13th, seven days after capture, at the south end of the “long bridge,” ordered out of the cars and into line, counted off and started for Belle Isle. Said island is in the James River, probably covers ten or twelve acres, and is right across from Richmond. The river between Richmond and the island is probably a third or half a mile. The “long bridge” is near the lower part of the island. It is a cold, bleak piece of ground and the winter winds have free sweep from up the river. Before noon we were turned into the pen which is merely enclosed by a ditch and the dirt taken from the ditch thrown up on the outside, making a sort of breastwork. The ditch serves as a dead line, and no prisoners must go near the ditch. The prison is in command of a Lieut. Bossieux, a rather young and gallant looking sort of fellow. Is a born Southerner, talking so much like a negro that you would think he was one, if you could hear him talk and not see him. He has two rebel sergeants to act as his assistants, Sergt. Hight and Sergt. Marks. These two men are very cruel, as is also the Lieut. when angered. Outside the prison pen is a bake house, made of boards, the rebel tents for the accommodation of the officers and guard, and a hospital also of tent cloth. Running from the pen is a lane enclosed by high boards going to the water's edge. At night this is closed up by a gate at the pen, and thrown open in the morning. About half of the six thousand prisoners here have tents while the rest sleep and live out of doors.

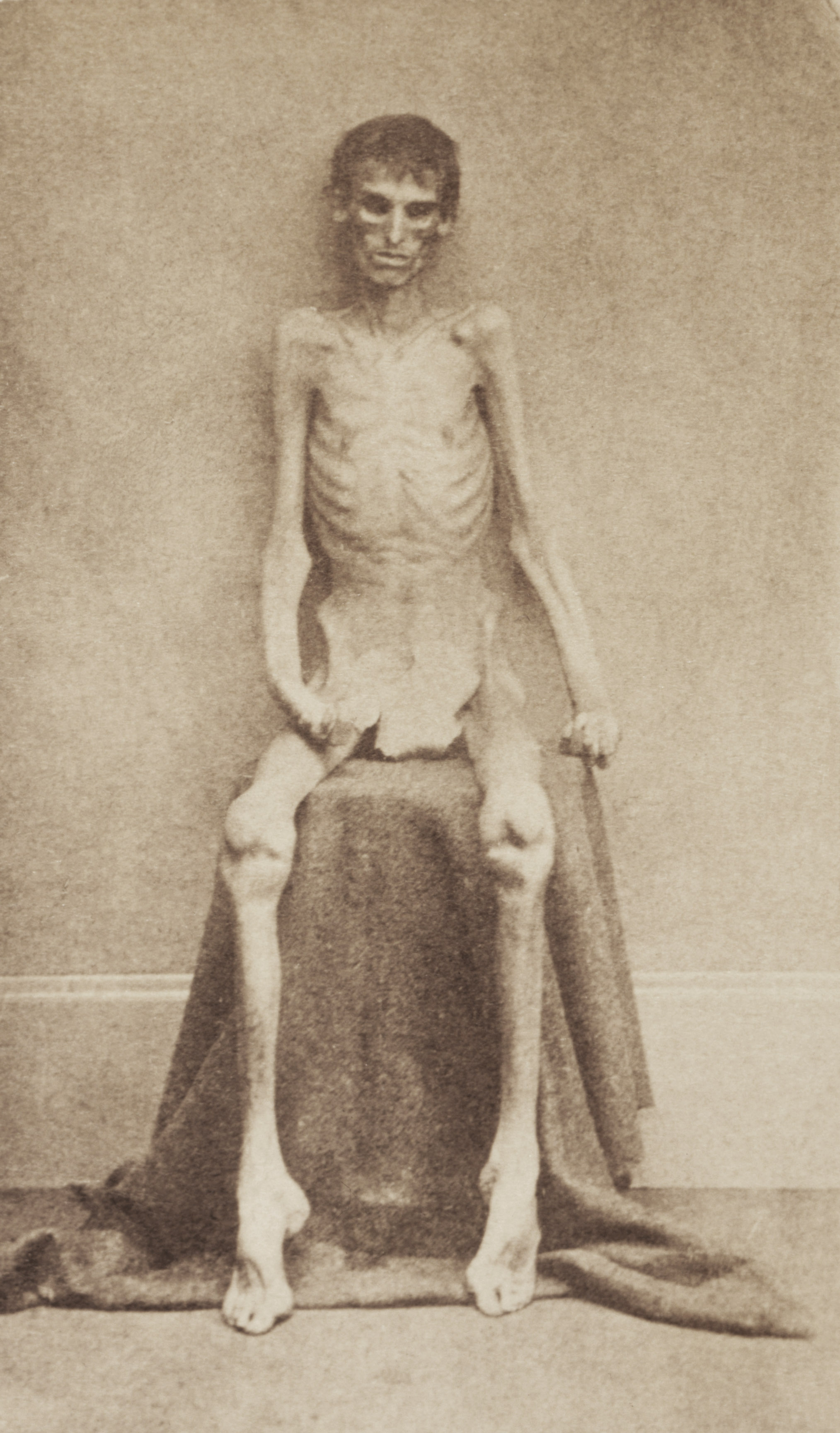
Unidentified prisoner of war from Belle Isle.

In 1864, Peter DeWitt, Assistant Surgeon at Jarvis Hospital, Baltimore, received a number of prisoners recently released from the Prisoner of War camp at Belle Isle. He described the "great majority" of the patients as being:

in a semi-state of nudity...laboring under such diseases as chronic diarrhoea, phthisis pulmonalis, scurvy, frost bites, general debility, caused by starvation, neglect and exposure. Many of them had partially lost their reason, forgetting even the date of their capture, and everything connected with their antecedent history. They resemble, in many respect, patients laboring under cretinism. They were filthy in the extreme, covered in vermin...nearly all were extremely emaciated; so much so that they had to be cared for even like infants.

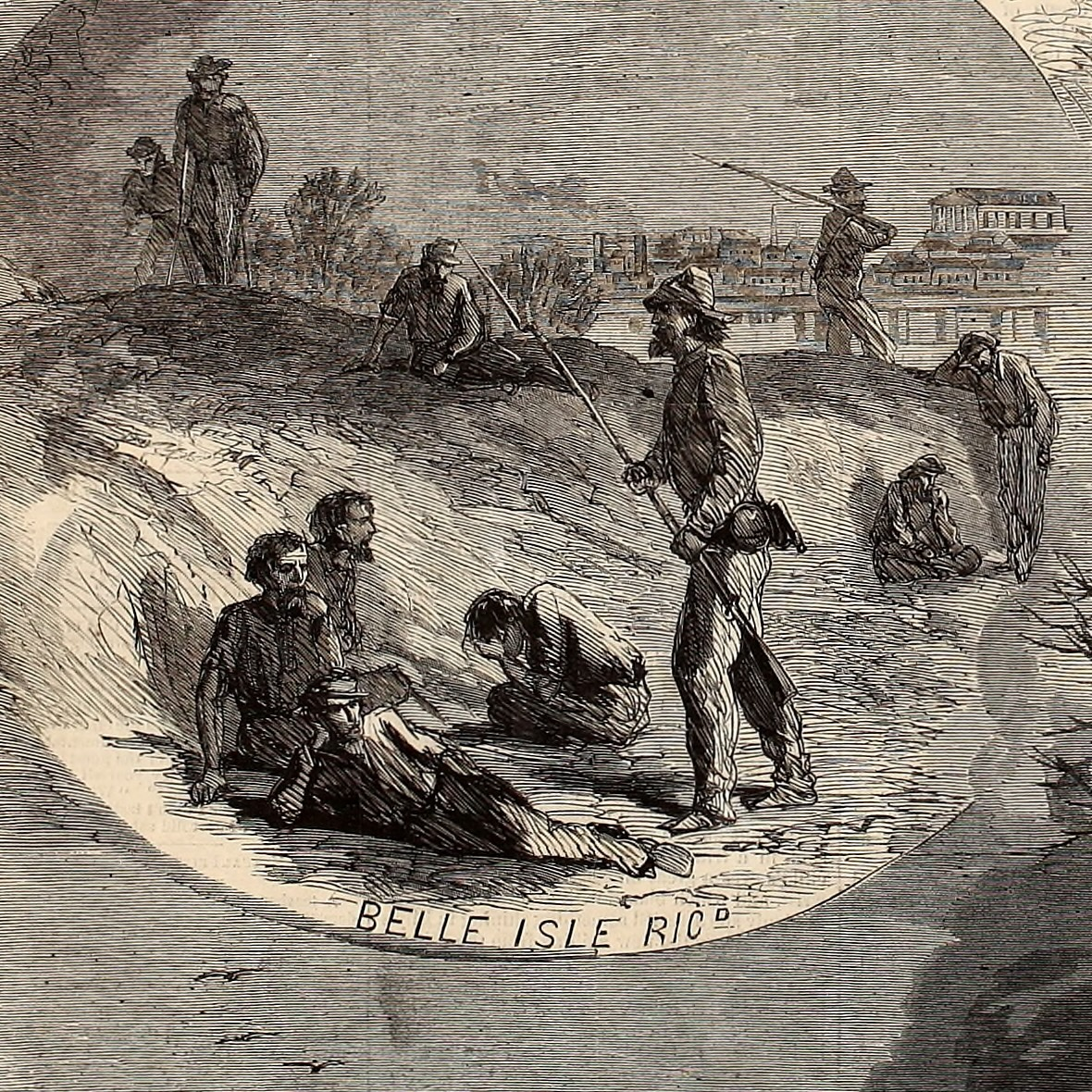
Illustration of U.S. prisoners at Belle Isle (Harper's Weekly, May 21, 1864)

In May 1864, Lucius Eugene Chittenden, Assistant Secretary of the Treasury under President Abraham Lincoln was sent by the president to investigate freed prisoners from Belle Isle and gave his eyewitness account in, "Recollections of President Lincoln and His Administration," published in the late 1890s. He related the shock Lincoln shared at learning that Union prisoners had been left by the Confederates to freeze and starve to death in the shadow of the Confederate Capital.

=== Twentieth century to present ===
The Virginia Electric and Power Company (now Dominion Energy) built and operated a hydroelectric power plant on the island between 1904 and 1963. The ruins of this plant, along with those of several other buildings remain on the island.

Belle Isle is briefly mentioned in Chapter III of MacKinlay Kantor's Pulitzer Prize-winning novel about the Civil War, "Andersonville" (1955). Conditions at the prison camp are described in more detail in Chapters IX and XIII.

The original Lee Bridge was built over the island in 1934 and replaced by the current version in 1988. Belle Isle was formally made into a park in 1973.

In the 2001 movie Hannibal, the power plant can be seen as Agent Starling runs across the bridge on the south side of the island.

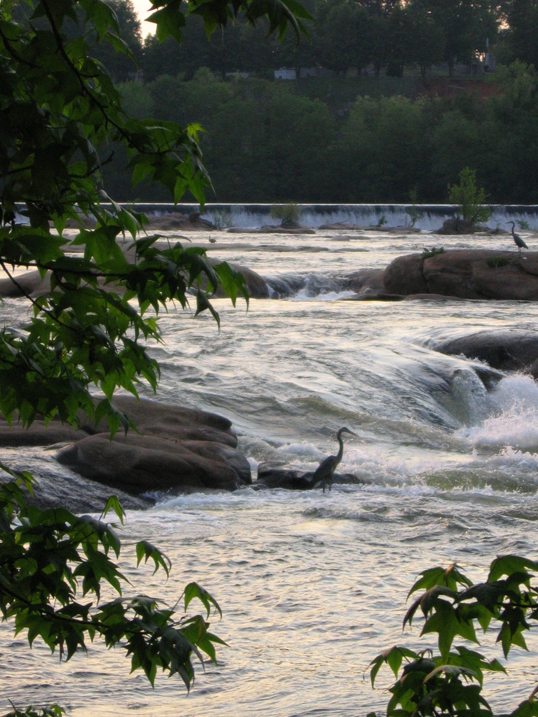
Herons fishing in the rapids. A view from the northern bank of Belle Isle, across the James River, to the bluffs of Hollywood Cemetery.

Belle Isle offers Richmonders the opportunity to view wildlife in its natural habitat, at a location only a few minutes from the heart of the city. Songbirds, ducks, cormorants and blue herons are a common sight. Squirrels, other small mammals, amphibians and reptiles also inhabit the island. Some sections of trails are a part of the East Coast Greenway.

== See also ==
- Libby Prison
