= Dahlgren affair =

1864 American Civil War incident

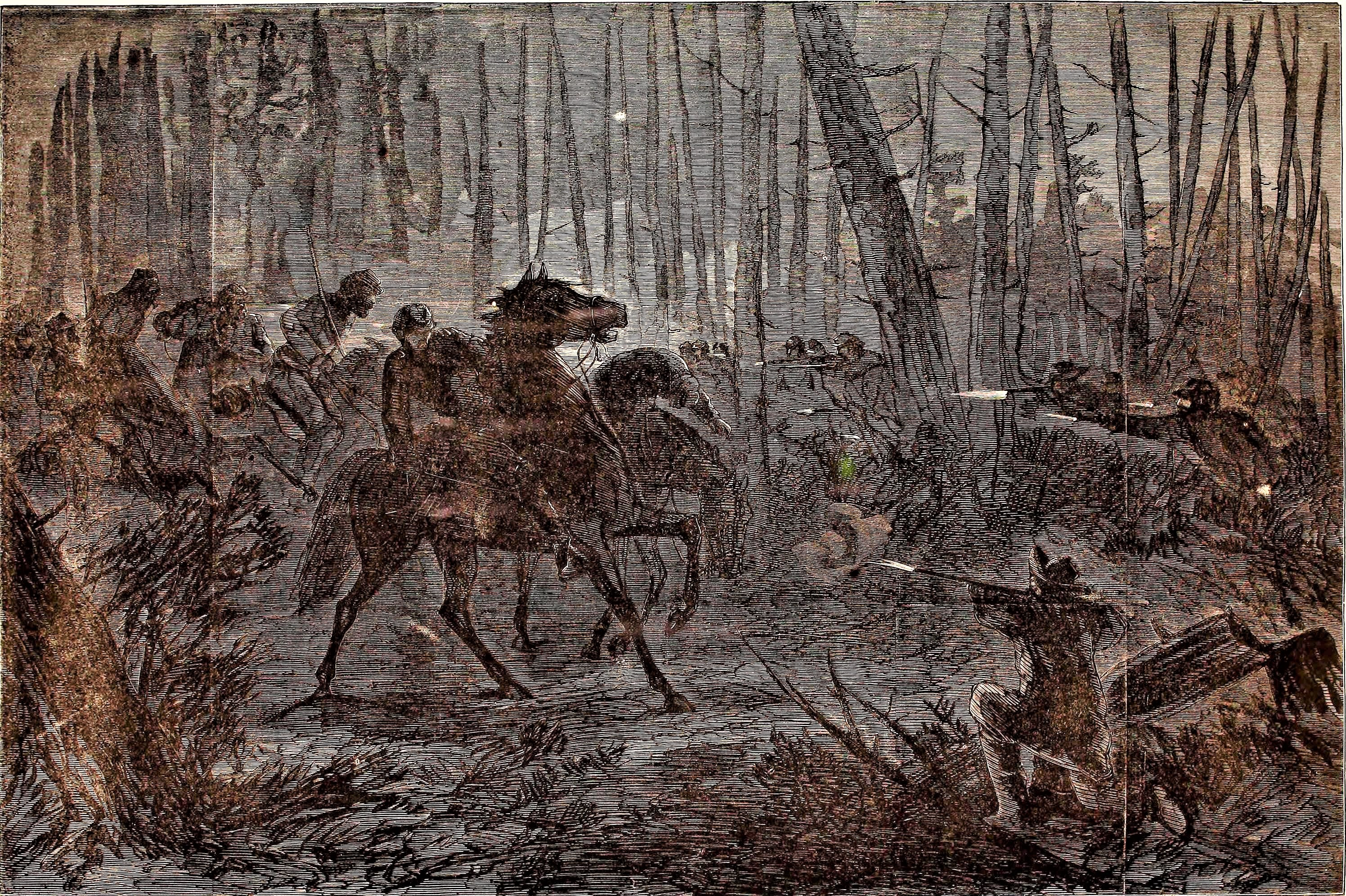
Ambuscade and Death of Colonel Dahlgren from Harper's Weekly

The Dahlgren affair was an incident during the American Civil War which stemmed from a failed Union raid on the Confederate capital of Richmond, Virginia in March 1864. Brigadier General Hugh Judson Kilpatrick and Colonel Ulric Dahlgren led an attack on Richmond to free Union prisoners from Belle Isle and damage Confederate infrastructure.

The attack failed and Dahlgren was killed while in retreat during the Battle of Walkerton. Papers discovered on his body purportedly revealed orders to free Union prisoners from Belle Isle, arm them with flammable material, torch the city of Richmond while also carrying out a decapitation strike of the Confederate government by assassinating President Jefferson Davis and his entire cabinet.

The papers were published in the Richmond newspapers and sparked outrage in the South with speculation that President Abraham Lincoln had given the orders himself. An angry mob disinterred Dahlgren's remains and disrespectfully placed them on display in Richmond. Reports of the mistreatment of Dahlgren's corpse inflamed public opinion in the North. Union newspapers and Dahlgren's father, Union Navy Rear Admiral John A. Dahlgren claimed the papers were a forgery. Union Major General George Meade had to personally assure Confederate General Robert E. Lee that the orders were not authorized by the Union Army. The controversy is known to have caused Davis and his cabinet to authorize Thomas Hines to unleash the total war of the Northwest Conspiracy behind Union lines and may also have contributed to John Wilkes Booth's assassination of President Lincoln.

It has never been determined if the papers were forged or if not, who they were written by, although historian Stephen W. Sears points to the "unscrupulous" Secretary of War Edwin M. Stanton as the authority behind the plan to have the freed Richmond prisoners commit arson and assassination. Captain John McEntee of the Bureau of Military Intelligence, who accompanied Dahlgren on the raid, told General Marsena Patrick that the published documents were accurate, as they corresponded with what Dalhgren told him. This was confirmed by another B.M.I. agent, John Babcock.

After the war, Stanton requested the documents from Francis Lieber, who had been tasked with accumulating and preserving captured Confederate documents. Lieber was ordered to give them to the Secretary of War, and they were never seen again.

== Background ==
In the winter of 1863-1864, Confederate prisoner camps such as Belle Isle and Libby Prison had become dangerously overcrowded due to the Confederacy's refusal to include captured black Union soldiers in the Dix–Hill Cartel exchanges of prisoners with the North. It was estimated that 1,500 Union soldiers were dying each month in Confederate prisons.

Spies reported that the Confederacy had very few men guarding the capital of Richmond and Brigadier General Hugh Judson Kilpatrick received approval from Secretary of War, Edwin M. Stanton, to launch an ambitious cavalry raid against Richmond. Kilpatrick had a reputation for recklessness which earned him the nickname "Kill-Cavalry".

Kilpatrick recruited Colonel Ulric Dahlgren to assist in the attack. Dahlgren had lost the lower portion of one of his legs after being wounded at Hagerstown the previous July, and was eager to return to action after his recovery. After recovering from his injury, Dahlgren met Brig. Gen. Hugh Judson Kilpatrick on February 23, 1864, at a party and was invited to participate in an operation to attack Richmond, Virginia; rescue Union prisoners from Belle Isle and damage Confederate infrastructure.

== Kilpatrick-Dahlgren raid ==
Kilpatrick and Dahlgren led the operation to attack Richmond, Virginia; rescue Union prisoners from Belle Isle and damage Confederate infrastructure. The operation is also known as the Battle of Walkerton.

On February 28, Kilpatrick and Dahlgren left from Stevensburg, Virginia. Kilpatrick was to attack Richmond from the North with 3,500 men and Dahlgren from the South with 500 men. Snow, sleet and rain from an unexpected winter storm slowed the attack.

Dahlgren's forces were led to a ford on the James River near Dover Mills but were unable to cross due to high water from recent rains. Dahlgren redirected his troops to attack Richmond from the East. They heard the sound of battle and rushed to support Kilpatrick but ran directly into a Confederate Home Guard force which halted their advance. Dahlgren retreated East in an attempt to connect with Kilpatrick's force.

The Union troops were continually harassed by Confederate forces during the retreat and became separated. On the night of March 3rd, Dahlgren and a portion of his troops were ambushed near King and Queen Court House by 150 men in the Virginia cavalry under the command of Lieutenant James Pollard. Dahlgren was shot by four bullets and died on the battlefield. Several other Union soldiers were killed in the ambush and 135 were captured.

== Discovery of the Dahlgren papers ==
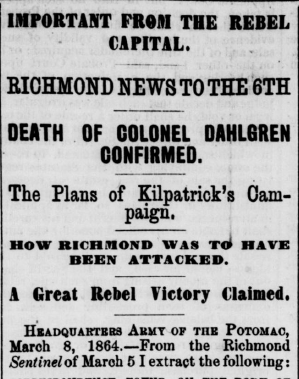
Dahlgren Raid Headline March 1864

Dahlgren's body was searched by a 13 year old boy, William Littlepage. He was searching for valuables but found a packet of papers that he gave to his teacher Edward Halbach. The papers were orders to free Union prisoners from Belle Isle, supply them with flammable material and torch the city of Richmond. Union troops were to capture and kill Confederate President Jefferson Davis and his cabinet.

According to other sources, such as Alexandria Gazette, October 16, 1865, it was Major Heros von Borcke who led the party which killed Ulric Dahlgren and who searched the body and found the papers, and his lieutenant handed them to Fitzhugh Lee. The names 'Halbach' or 'Littlepage' are not to be found in any relation to Dahlgren's death in the Library of Congress's newspaper collection for the years 1864 following.

According to one of the papers:

The men must keep together and well in hand, and once in the city it must be destroyed and Jeff. Davis and Cabinet killed.

Halbach immediately contacted his commander, Captain Richard H. Bagby, and informed him of the discovery. At 2 p.m. on March 3, Bagby transferred the papers to Lieutenant James Pollard with instructions to deliver them to his commander Col. Richard L. T. Beale. Beale instructed that they be delivered to the Confederate command in Richmond immediately. Pollard arrived in Richmond at noon on March 4 and delivered the papers to General Fitzhugh Lee. Lee, astonished at their contents, immediately took the papers to Davis and Secretary of State Judah P. Benjamin. Davis quietly read through the documents in Lee's presence and paused when he reached the assassination order, he remarked, "That means you, Mr. Benjamin." Lee was then instructed to take the papers to the War Department, where they were received by Secretary of War James A. Seddon. Seddon decided to release the documents publicly and sought Davis's approval to do so. The Richmond newspapers were contacted for a conference at the War Department and given copies of the orders, which were published the next morning on March 5. The papers were published in the Richmond Examiner and sparked outrage in the South. The newspapers compared Dahlgren to Atilla the Hun and speculated that Lincoln himself had given the orders.

== Mistreatment of Dahlgren's corpse ==
Dahlgren was originally interred where he was shot. After the publication of the papers, an outraged mob disinterred his body and placed it on display at the York River Railroad depot in Richmond. Dahlgren's wooden leg was displayed in a store window and his finger was cut off to remove a ring. These reports of the mistreatment of Dahlgren's corpse inflamed Northern public opinion.

After the public display of his corpse, Dahlgren was interred in an unmarked grave at Oakwood Cemetery in Richmond. The Union spy Elizabeth Van Lew used her connections in Richmond to secretly exhume his remains and reinter them at a farm 10 miles outside of Richmond to prevent further desecration of his body. Dahlgren was eventually interred at Laurel Hill Cemetery in Philadelphia.

== Union denial of the papers ==
Union newspapers claimed the orders were a forgery and Dahlgren's father, Union Navy Rear Admiral John A. Dahlgren, strongly denied his son would be involved in such a scandal. Union Major General George Meade had to personally assure Confederate General Robert E. Lee that the orders were not sanctioned by the Union Army. The controversy may have contributed to John Wilkes Booth's decision to assassinate President Abraham Lincoln a year later.

It was never absolutely determined if the orders were written by Dahlgren, Kilpatrick, Secretary of War Edwin M. Stanton or President Lincoln. Historian Stephen W. Sears points to the "unscrupulous" Stanton as the probable authority behind the plan to have the freed Richmond prisoners commit arson and assassination. As to whether the papers were forgeries or not – Dahlgren's name was misspelled in them – Captain John McEntee of the Bureau of Military Intelligence, who accompanied Dahlgren on the raid, told General Marsena Patrick that the published documents were accurate, as they corresponded with what Dalhgren told him. This was confirmed by another B.M.I. agent, John Babcock. Nonetheless, some historians, such as Duane Schultz in The Dahlgren Affair: Terror and Conspiracy in the Civil War, continued to argue that the papers were forged and intended to justify the numerous state terrorism plots by the Confederate Secret Service, such as the arson attack against New York City, the Northwest Conspiracy, and repeated efforts to kidnap Lincoln and blow up the White House. However, a new handwriting study performed on the papers by the Smithsonian Channel seems to confirm that the documents are authentic, and the theory is that, despite official denials, it was Stanton who issued the assassination orders.

After the war, Stanton requested the documents from Francis Lieber, who had been tasked with accumulating and preserving captured Confederate documents. Lieber was ordered to turn them over, and they have never been seen again.
