= List of American Civil War battles =

Battles of the American Civil War were fought between April 12, 1861, and May 12–13, 1865 in 19 states, mostly Confederate (Alabama, Arkansas, Florida, Georgia, Kansas, Kentucky, Louisiana, Maryland, Mississippi, Missouri, North Carolina, Ohio, Pennsylvania, South Carolina, Tennessee, Texas, Vermont, Virginia, and West Virginia (Note: On June 19, 1861, at the Second Wheeling Convention, delegates from western Virginia formed the Unionist "Restored government of Virginia" in Wheeling opposed to the secessionist government in Richmond. West Virginia became the 35th state in the Union on June 20, 1863.)), the District of Columbia, and six territories (Arizona Territory, Confederate Arizona (Note: Arizona Territory (USA) was split from New Mexico Territory on February 24, 1863. The geographically different Arizona Territory (CSA), known as Confederate Arizona, was officially declared on August 1, 1861.), Colorado Territory, Dakota Territory, Indian Territory (present-day Oklahoma), New Mexico Territory, and Washington Territory), as well as naval engagements. Virginia in particular was the site of many major and decisive battles. These battles would change the standing and historical memory of the United States.

For lists of battles organized by campaign and theater, see:

- Eastern theater of the American Civil War
- Western theater of the American Civil War
- Trans-Mississippi theater of the American Civil War
- Pacific coast theater of the American Civil War
- Lower seaboard theater of the American Civil War

Some battles have more than one name. For instance, the battles known in the North as Battle of Antietam and Second Battle of Bull Run were referred to as the Battles of Sharpsburg and Manassas, respectively, by the South. This was because the North tended to name battles after landmarks (often rivers or bodies of water), whereas the South named battles after nearby towns.

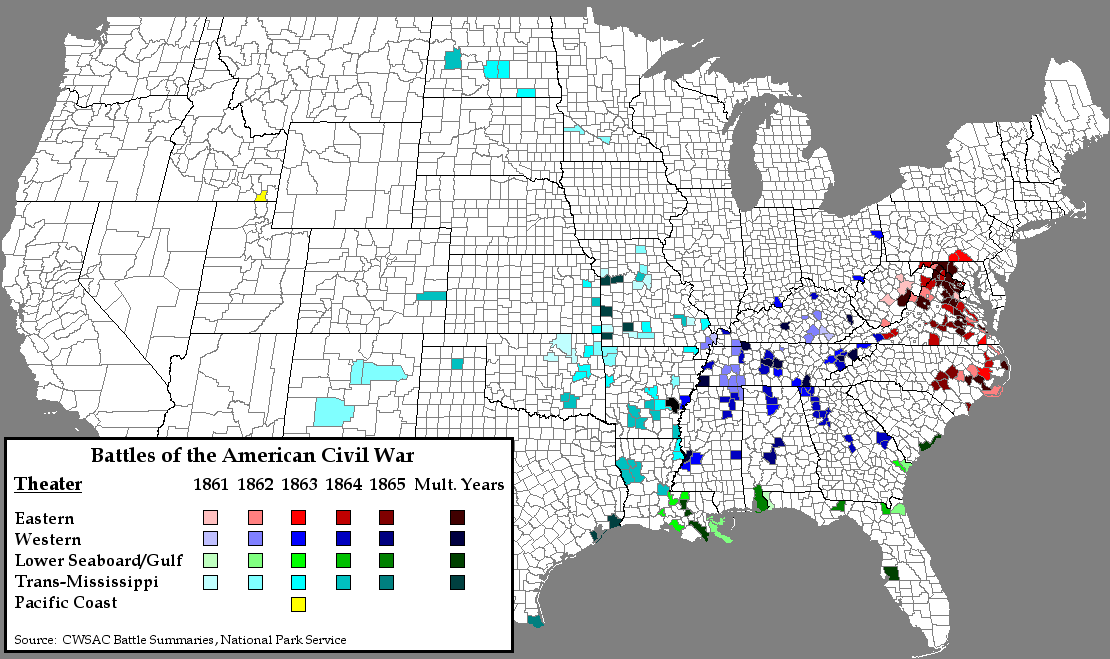

== Battles rated by CWSAC ==
The American Battlefield Protection Program (ABPP) was established within the United States National Park Service to classify the preservation status of historic battlefield land. In 1993, the Civil War Sites Advisory Commission (CWSAC) reported to Congress and the ABPP on their extensive analysis of significant battles and battlefields. Of the estimated 8,000 occasions in which hostilities occurred in the American Civil War, this table and related articles describe the 384 battles that were classified in CWSAC's Report on the Nation's Civil War Battlefields. In addition to the status of battlefield land preservation (not included in this table) CWSAC rated the military significance of the battles into four classes, as follows:

Class A – Decisive: A general engagement involving field armies in which a commander achieved a vital strategic objective. Such a result might include an indisputable victory on the field or be limited to the success or termination of a campaign offensive. Decisive battles had a direct, observable impact on the direction, duration, conduct, or outcome of the war.
Class B – Major: An engagement of magnitude involving field armies or divisions of the armies in which a commander achieved an important strategic objective within the context of an ongoing campaign offensive. Major battles had a direct, observable impact on the direction, duration, conduct, or outcome of the campaign.
Class C – Formative: An engagement involving divisions or detachments of the field armies in which a commander accomplished a limited campaign objective of reconnaissance, disruption, defense, or occupation. Formative battles had an observable influence on the direction, duration, or conduct of the campaign.
Class D – Limited: An engagement, typically involving detachments of the field armies, in which a commander achieved a limited tactical objective of reconnaissance, defense, or occupation. Limited battles maintained contact between the combatants without observable influence on the direction of the campaign.

Battles of the American Civil War Rated by CWSAC
Date	Battle	State	CWSAC	Outcome	
Date	Battle	State	CWSAC	Victory	Notes
April 12–13, 1861	Battle of Fort Sumter	South Carolina	A	Confederate	Beauregard takes Charleston Federal fort in the first battle of the American Civil War.
May 18–19, 1861	Battle of Sewell's Point	Virginia	D	Inconclusive	Union gunboats fight inconclusive battle with Confederate artillery.
May 29 – June 1, 1861	Battle of Aquia Creek	Virginia	D	Inconclusive	Confederate artillery hit by naval bombardment, later withdrawn.
June 3, 1861	Battle of Philippi (West Virginia)	West Virginia (Virginia at the time)	D	Union	Union forces rout a small Confederate detachment in Western Virginia.
June 10, 1861	Battle of Big Bethel	Virginia	C	Confederate	Union attack on Confederate positions near a church repelled.
June 17, 1861	Battle of Boonville (Missouri)	Missouri	C	Union	Union forces defeat pro-Confederate governor's Missouri State Guard.
July 2, 1861	Battle of Hoke's Run	West Virginia (Virginia at the time)	D	Union	Robert Patterson defeats Jackson's Confederates but fails to capitalize on his victory.
July 5, 1861	Battle of Carthage	Missouri	C	Confederate	Confederate victory in Missouri during U.S. Civil War.
July 11, 1861	Battle of Rich Mountain	West Virginia (Virginia at the time)	B	Union	Confederate forces under Gen. Robert S. Garnett split in half mid-battle by Union forces under Maj. Gen. George B. McClellan. One half surrenders; the other escapes.
July 18, 1861	Battle of Blackburn's Ford	Virginia	C	Confederate	Irvin McDowell's recon-in-force defeated at Manassas.
July 21, 1861	First Battle of Bull Run or First Manassas	Virginia	A	Confederate	McDowell loses to J.E. Johnston, Beauregard; Jackson named "Stonewall".
August 10, 1861	Battle of Wilson's Creek or Oak Hills	Missouri	A	Confederate	Union forces under Nathaniel Lyon and Samuel D. Sturgis lose to Confederates under Sterling Price and Benjamin McCulloch. Lyon is killed. First major battle west of the Mississippi.
August 26, 1861	Battle of Kessler's Cross Lanes	West Virginia (Virginia at the time)	D	Confederate	Confederates under John B. Floyd surprise and defeat Union forces under Erastus B. Tyler.
August 28–29, 1861	Battle of Hatteras Inlet Batteries	North Carolina	C	Union	Union forces capture two North Carolina forts.
September 2, 1861	Battle of Dry Wood Creek	Missouri	D	Confederate	Union cavalry from Kansas defeated by Missouri State Guard.
September 10, 1861	Battle of Carnifex Ferry	West Virginia (Virginia at the time)	B	Union	Confederates withdraw by night after several hours of fighting.
September 12–15, 1861	Battle of Cheat Mountain	West Virginia (Virginia at the time)	B	Union	300 Union troops withstand uncoordinated Confederate attacks.
September 13–20, 1861	First Battle of Lexington	Missouri	C	Confederate	Union forces badly defeated by Missouri State Guard.
September 17, 1861	Action at Blue Mills Landing	Missouri	D	Confederate	Minor Missouri State Guard victory.
September 19, 1861	Battle of Barbourville	Kentucky	D	Confederate	Zollicoffer raided a Federal recruitment camp and brought a counter-thrust.
October 3, 1861	Battle of Greenbrier River	West Virginia (Virginia at the time)	D	Inconclusive	Confederates withdraw after inconclusive battle.
October 9, 1861	Battle of Santa Rosa Island	Florida	C	Union	Union forces repel Confederate attempt to capture island.
October 21, 1861	Battle of Camp Wildcat	Kentucky	C	Union	Confederates chased from Cumberland Gap
October 21, 1861	Engagement at Fredericktown	Missouri	D	Union	Missouri State Guard defeated.
October 21, 1861	Battle of Ball's Bluff or Leesburg	Virginia	B	Confederate	550 Union soldiers captured.
October 25, 1861	First Battle of Springfield	Missouri	D	Union	Union forces capture town.
November 7, 1861	Battle of Belmont	Missouri	C	Inconclusive	Ulysses S. Grant captures and destroys Confederate supplies near Cairo, Illinois.
November 8, 1861	Battle of Ivy Mountain	Kentucky	D	Union	Union forces routed Confederate forces.
November 19, 1861	Battle of Round Mountain	Oklahoma (Indian Territory at the time)	D	Confederate	Opothleyahola's Unionist Creeks and Seminoles defeated near present-day Stillwater.
December 9, 1861	Battle of Chusto-Talasah	Oklahoma (Indian Territory at the time)	D	Confederate	Opothleyahola defeated near present-day Tulsa.
December 13, 1861	Battle of Camp Allegheny	West Virginia (Virginia at the time)	C	Inconclusive	Confederates withstand Union attack.
December 17, 1861	Battle of Rowlett's Station	Kentucky	D	Inconclusive	Union soldiers hold area, but do not launch any counter thrusts. Confederates and Texas Rangers retreat.
December 20, 1861	Battle of Dranesville	Virginia	C	Union	Union defeats Confederate forces under J.E.B. Stuart.
December 26, 1861	Battle of Chustenahlah	Oklahoma (Indian Territory at the time)	B	Confederate	Opothleyahola defeated, flees to Kansas.
December 28, 1861	Battle of Mount Zion Church	Missouri	D	Union	Union victory in Northeastern Missouri.
January 3, 1862	Battle of Cockpit Point	Virginia	C	Inconclusive	Inconclusive Civil War battle in Virginia.
January 5–6, 1862	Battle of Hancock	Maryland	D	Inconclusive	Unsuccessful Confederate attack on Maryland town.
January 8, 1862	Battle of Roan's Tan Yard	Missouri	D	Union	Confederates routed.
January 10, 1862	Battle of Middle Creek	Kentucky	C	Union	Union forces under James A. Garfield defeat Confederates under Humphrey Marshall.
January 19, 1862	Battle of Mill Springs	Kentucky	B	Union	Felix Zollicoffer killed.
February 6, 1862	Battle of Fort Henry	Tennessee	B	Union	Grant and Foote's gunboats gain control of Tennessee River by defeating Lloyd Tilghman
February 7–8, 1862	Battle of Roanoke Island	North Carolina	B	Union	Union forces under Ambrose E. Burnside capture island from Henry A. Wise
February 11–16, 1862	Battle of Fort Donelson	Tennessee	A	Union	Confederate army under Simon Bolivar Buckner surrenders to Grant, Union gains control of Cumberland River
February 20–21, 1862	Battle of Valverde	New Mexico (New Mexico Territory at the time)	B	Confederate	Union forces routed in New Mexico Territory.
February 28 – April 8, 1862	Battle of Island Number Ten (Battle of New Madrid)	Missouri	A	Union	Union victory by Pope over John P. McCown.
March 6–8, 1862	Battle of Pea Ridge or Elkhorn Tavern	Arkansas	A	Union	Union victory by Samuel Ryan Curtis over Earl Van Dorn ensured continued Union control of Missouri.
March 8–9, 1862	Battle of Hampton Roads	Virginia	B	Inconclusive	USS Monitor battles CSS Virginia, battle ends in a draw.
March 14, 1862	Battle of New Bern	North Carolina	B	Union	Union troops disembark from ships and capture the town.
March 23, 1862	First Battle of Kernstown	Virginia	B	Union	Union forces defeat Confederates under "Stonewall" Jackson.
March 23 – April 26, 1862	Battle of Fort Macon	North Carolina	C	Union	Confederate fort surrenders after Union artillery bombardment.
March 26–28, 1862	Battle of Glorieta Pass	New Mexico (New Mexico Territory at the time)	A	Union	Tactical draw. Union strategic victory. Dubbed the "Gettysburg of the West".
April 5 – May 4, 1862	Siege of Yorktown (1862) (Battle of Yorktown)	Virginia	B	Inconclusive	Confederate army slips away after four week siege near site of decisive Revolutionary War battle.
April 6–7, 1862	Battle of Shiloh or Pittsburg Landing	Tennessee	A	Union	Grant and reinforcements under Buell repulse Albert Sidney Johnston and P. G. T. Beauregard. A.S. Johnston is killed.
April 10–11, 1862	Battle of Fort Pulaski	Georgia	B	Union	Union blockade closes Savannah, Georgia. Parrott rifle makes masonry forts obsolete.
April 18–28, 1862	Battle of Forts Jackson and St. Philip	Louisiana	A	Union	Decisive battle for possession of New Orleans.
April 19, 1862	Battle of South Mills	North Carolina	D	Inconclusive	Confederates thwart attempt to destroy a canal.
April 25 – May 1, 1862	Capture of New Orleans	Louisiana	B	Union	Union forces capture city.
April 29 – May 30, 1862	Siege of Corinth	Mississippi	A	Union	Union forces capture town, Beauregard tricks Union in order to escape to Tupelo.
May 5, 1862	Battle of Williamsburg	Virginia	B	Inconclusive	McClellan and Longstreet fight inconclusive battle.
May 7, 1862	Battle of Eltham's Landing	Virginia	D	Inconclusive	Inconclusive Civil War battle in Virginia.
May 8, 1862	Battle of McDowell	Virginia	C	Confederate	Stonewall Jackson's Confederates defeat Union forces.
May 15, 1862	Battle of Drewry's Bluff	Virginia	B	Confederate	Union naval attack repelled by Confederate artillery.
May 15–17, 1862	Battle of Princeton Court House	West Virginia (Virginia at the time)	C	Confederate	Jacob Dolson Cox withdrew after attempting to take control of the East Tennessee and Virginian Railroad.
May 23, 1862	Battle of Front Royal	Virginia	C	Confederate	Stonewall Jackson threatens the Union rear, forces their retreat.
May 25, 1862	First Battle of Winchester	Virginia	A	Confederate	Stonewall Jackson defeats Nathaniel P. Banks.
May 27, 1862	Battle of Hanover Court House	Virginia	C	Union	Union victory during U.S. Civil War.
May 31 – June 1, 1862	Battle of Seven Pines	Virginia	B	Inconclusive	J.E. Johnston attacks Union forces, wounded, inconclusive
June 5, 1862	Battle of Tranter's Creek	North Carolina	D	Union	Confederate forces retreat after Colonel Singletary is killed.
June 6, 1862	First Battle of Memphis	Tennessee	B	Union	Union forces capture the city.
June 7–8, 1862	First Battle of Chattanooga	Tennessee	D	Union	Union forces bombard the town.
June 8, 1862	Battle of Cross Keys	Virginia	B	Confederate	John C. Fremont defeated by elements of Stonewall Jackson's force.
June 9, 1862	Battle of Port Republic	Virginia	B	Confederate	Costly victory for Stonewall Jackson.
June 16, 1862	Battle of Secessionville	South Carolina	B	Confederate	Union repulsed, Union commander later court-martialed for disobeying orders.
June 17, 1862	Battle of Saint Charles	Arkansas	C	Union	The USS Mound City is hit by Confederate shore gun and explodes.
June 21, 1862	Battle of Simmon's Bluff	South Carolina	D	Union	Union forces raze a campsite; Confederates flee.
June 25, 1862	Battle of Oak Grove	Virginia	D	Inconclusive	(Seven Days Battles) Indecisive battle between McClellan and Lee.
June 26, 1862	Battle of Beaver Dam Creek or Mechanicsville	Virginia	B	Union	(Seven Days) Robert E. Lee defeated.
June 27, 1862	Battle of Gaines' Mill or Chickahominy River	Virginia	A	Confederate	(Seven Days) Lee defeats McClellan.
June 27–28, 1862	Battle of Garnett's & Golding's Farm	Virginia	D	Inconclusive	(Seven Days) Indecisive battle between Lee and McClellan.
June 29, 1862	Battle of Savage's Station	Virginia	C	Inconclusive	(Seven Days) Union forces withdraw.
June 30 – July 1, 1862	Battle of Tampa	Florida	D	Confederate	Union gunboat attacks, but later withdraws.
June 30, 1862	Battle of Glendale	Virginia	B	Inconclusive	(Seven Days) McClellan retreats from Lee's Confederates.
June 30, 1862	Battle of White Oak Swamp	Virginia	C	Inconclusive	(Seven Days) Indecisive artillery duel.
July 1, 1862	Battle of Malvern Hill	Virginia	A	Union	(Seven Days) McClellan defeats Lee but withdraws after battle.
July 7, 1862	Battle of Cotton Plant (Battle of Hill's Plantation)	Arkansas	D	Union	Union victory in Arkansas.
July 13, 1862	First Battle of Murfreesboro	Tennessee	C	Confederate	Confederates disrupted Union supply lines, and tore up railroad track. Union forces going to Chattanooga are divided.
August 5, 1862	Battle of Baton Rouge	Louisiana	B	Union	Union troops repulse attempt to recapture Baton Rouge.
August 6–9, 1862	Battle of Kirksville	Missouri	D	Union	Union forces capture town.
August 9, 1862	First Battle of Donaldsonville	Louisiana	D	Union	Union Navy bombarded Donaldsonville with no resistance.
August 9, 1862	Battle of Cedar Mountain	Virginia	B	Confederate	Union forces repelled by Confederate counter-attack.
August 11, 1862	First Battle of Independence	Missouri	D	Confederate	Confederate victory near Kansas City.
August 15–16, 1862	Battle of Lone Jack	Missouri	D	Confederate	Confederate victory, Union commander killed. Rebels forced to withdraw after battle.
August 21–22, 1862	Battle of Fort Ridgely	Minnesota	C	Union	Dakota War of 1862: Failed Santee Sioux attack on Union controlled fort.
August 22–25, 1862	First Battle of Rappahannock Station	Virginia	D	Inconclusive	Union supplies destroyed during skirmish.
August 25–27, 1862	Battle of Manassas Station Ops.	Virginia	B	Confederate	Jackson turns into Pope's rear area; destroys Manassas Station.
August 28–30, 1862	Second Battle of Bull Run or Second Manassas	Virginia	A	Confederate	Lee defeats Pope's Army of Virginia
August 28, 1862	Battle of Thoroughfare Gap	Virginia	C	Confederate	Longstreet defeats small Union force to arrive at Manassas battlefield.
August 30, 1862	Battle of Richmond (Kentucky)	Kentucky	B	Confederate	Edmund Kirby Smith routs Union army under Brig. Gen. William "Bull" Nelson.
September 1, 1862	Battle of Chantilly or Ox Hill	Virginia	B	Inconclusive	Union forces nearly being cut off, Isaac Stevens and Philip Kearny are killed.
September 12–15, 1862	Battle of Harpers Ferry	West Virginia (Virginia at the time)	B	Confederate	Stonewall Jackson captures Union garrison under Dixon S. Miles
September 14–17, 1862	Battle of Munfordville	Kentucky	B	Confederate	Union force surrenders.
September 14, 1862	Battle of South Mountain or Boonsboro	Maryland	B	Union	McClellan defeats Lee.
September 17, 1862	Battle of Antietam or Sharpsburg	Maryland	A	Union	McClellan ends Lee's first invasion of North, bloodiest single day of the war.
September 19–20, 1862	Battle of Shepherdstown	West Virginia (Virginia at the time)	C	Confederate	Confederate brigades counterattack and defeat pursuing Union brigades.
September 19, 1862	Battle of Iuka	Mississippi	C	Union	Rosecrans is victorious over Price near Mississippi town.
September 23, 1862	Battle of Wood Lake	Minnesota	C	Union	Dakota War of 1862: Overwhelming defeat of Santee Sioux forces during the Dakota War of 1862.
September 24, 1862	First Battle of Sabine Pass	Texas	C	Union	Union Navy successfully bombards an established Confederate fort.
September 30, 1862	First Battle of Newtonia	Missouri	C	Confederate	Union forces panic under bombardment from Confederate artillery.
October 1–3, 1862	Battle of Saint John's Bluff	Florida	D	Union	Union troops seize a Confederate Battery.
October 3–4, 1862	Second Battle of Corinth (Battle of Corinth)	Mississippi	B	Union	Confederate attack fails.
October 4, 1862	Battle of Galveston Harbor (1862) (First Battle of Galveston)	Texas	D	Union	Galveston is taken by the Union forces after Confederates evacuate following a truce.
October 5, 1862	Battle of Hatchie Bridge	Tennessee	C	Inconclusive	Confederate force under Earl Van Dorn escapes across river.
October 8, 1862	Battle of Perryville or Chaplin Hills	Kentucky	A	Inconclusive	Tactical indecisive battle that ended Bragg's Kentucky campaign.
October 22, 1862	Battle of Old Fort Wayne	Oklahoma (Indian Territory at the time)	D	Union	Confederate forces go into Full retreat under Douglas H. Cooper, with the Union gaining control of the Indian territory.
October 27, 1862	Battle of Georgia Landing	Louisiana	C	Union	Confederate forces fled to Labadieville.
November 7, 1862	Battle of Clark's Mill	Missouri	D	Confederate	Union force surrenders to larger Confederate force.
November 28, 1862	Battle of Cane Hill	Arkansas	C	Confederate	Small Confederate force delays Union while larger force escapes.
December 7, 1862	Battle of Prairie Grove	Arkansas	B	Union	Union secures NW Arkansas.
December 7, 1862	Battle of Hartsville	Tennessee	C	Confederate	Disguised in Union uniforms, Confederates infiltrate and defeat Union forces.
December 13, 1862	Battle of Fredericksburg	Virginia	A	Confederate	Lee beats back repeated frontal assaults by Burnside.
December 14, 1862	Battle of Kinston	North Carolina	D	Union	Union forces under John G. Foster defeat Confederates under Nathan Evans.
December 16, 1862	Battle of White Hall	North Carolina	D	Inconclusive	Foster fights indecisive battle with Beverly Robertson.
December 17, 1862	Battle of Goldsborough Bridge	North Carolina	C	Union	Foster defeats Confederates and destroys the bridge.
December 19, 1862	Battle of Jackson, Tennessee	Tennessee	D	Union	Confederate feint to distract Union forces.
December 26–29, 1862	Battle of Chickasaw Bayou	Mississippi	B	Confederate	(Vicksburg Campaign) Pemberton defeats Sherman; Union attack on Confederate right flank thwarted.
December 31, 1862	Battle of Parker's Cross Roads	Tennessee	C	Confederate	Confederates repel Union double-pronged assault.
December 31, 1862 – January 2, 1863	Battle of Stones River (Second Battle of Murfreesboro)	Tennessee	A	Union	Bragg forced to withdraw after losing 11,739 men.
January 1, 1863	Battle of Galveston (Second Battle of Galveston)	Texas	B	Confederate	John B. Magruder expels occupying Union troops from Galveston, Texas.
January 8, 1863	Second Battle of Springfield	Missouri	D	Union	Confederates enter town, but are unable to take nearby fort.
January 9, 1863	Battle of Arkansas Post (Battle of Fort Hindman)	Arkansas	C	Union	Part of Vicksburg Campaign, fight for control of mouth of Arkansas River.
January 9–11, 1863	Battle of Hartville	Missouri	D	Confederate	Confederates are victorious, but unable to continue raid.
January 29, 1863	Bear River Massacre	Idaho (Washington Territory at the time)	C	Union	American Indian Wars: Shoshone forces massacred by Union troops.
February 3, 1863	Battle of Dover	Tennessee	D	Union	Failed Confederate attack on town.
March 5, 1863	Battle of Fort McAllister (1863)	Georgia	C	Confederate	Confederate forces held off Union Naval sieges
March 5, 1863	Battle of Thompson's Station	Tennessee	C	Confederate	Earl Van Dorn defeats John Coburn
March 13–15, 1863	Battle of Fort Anderson	North Carolina	D	Union	Daniel H. Hill leads unsuccessful Confederate attack on New Bern.
March 17, 1863	Battle of Kelly's Ford	Virginia	C	Confederate	Indecisive cavalry battle during Civil War.
March 20, 1863	Battle of Vaught's Hill	Tennessee	D	Union	Union forces withstand attack by John Hunt Morgan's Confederates.
March 25, 1863	Battle of Brentwood	Tennessee	D	Confederate	Union force surrenders.
March 30 – April 20, 1863	Battle of Washington, NC	North Carolina	D	Inconclusive	Hill unable to take North Carolina town from Union forces.
April 7, 1863	First Battle of Charleston Harbor	South Carolina	C	Confederate	Charleston fails to fall to the Union; Fort Sumter holds; USS Keokuk is sunk.
April 10, 1863	Battle of Franklin (1863)	Tennessee	D	Union	Confederates withdraw after rearguard defeat.
April 11 – May 4, 1863	Battle of Suffolk (Hill's Point) (Battle of Fort Huger)	Virginia	C	Inconclusive	Confederate forces captured from a rear attack.
April 11 – May 4, 1863	Battle of Suffolk (Norfleet House); Siege of Suffolk	Virginia	C	Inconclusive	Twin battles fought over Suffolk.
April 12–13, 1863	Battle of Fort Bisland	Louisiana	D	Union	Confederate forces retreat from Fort Bisland.
April 14, 1863	Battle of Irish Bend	Louisiana	C	Union	Richard Taylor retreats from Fort Bisland.
April 17, 1863	Battle of Vermilion Bayou	Louisiana	D	Union	Richard Taylor, being vastly outnumbered, retreats after an artillery skirmish.
April 26, 1863	Battle of Cape Girardeau	Missouri	D	Union	Confederate attack fails.
April 29, 1863	Battle of Grand Gulf	Mississippi	C	Confederate	Unsuccessful naval attack by Grant's forces.
April 29 – May 1, 1863	Battle of Snyder's Bluff	Mississippi	D	Confederate	Union feint during Vicksburg Campaign.
April 30, 1863	Battle of Day's Gap	Alabama	C	Union	Union victory during a raid in Alabama.
April 30 – May 6, 1863	Battle of Chancellorsville	Virginia	A	Confederate	Lee defeats Hooker's Army of Potomac, Jackson mortally wounded.
May 1, 1863	Battle of Port Gibson	Mississippi	B	Union	in Vicksburg campaign, Grant defeats Confederates
May 1–2, 1863	Battle of Chalk Bluff	Arkansas	D	Confederate	Confederates win but can't continue raid.
May 3, 1863	Second Battle of Fredericksburg	Virginia	B	Union	Union forces under John Sedgwick defeat Confederate forces left to guard the town by Lee.
May 3–4, 1863	Battle of Salem Church	Virginia	B	Confederate	Lee defeats Sedgwick.
May 12, 1863	Battle of Raymond	Mississippi	B	Union	Failed Confederate attempt to protect Vicksburg from approaching Federals.
May 14, 1863	Battle of Jackson, Mississippi	Mississippi	B	Union	Sherman, McPherson defeat Johnston
May 16, 1863	Battle of Champion Hill	Mississippi	A	Union	Grant defeats Pemberton.
May 17, 1863	Battle of Big Black River Bridge	Mississippi	B	Union	Confederate forces trapped in Vicksburg.
May 18 – July 4, 1863	Siege of Vicksburg	Mississippi	A	Union	the siege ends; Grant accepts surrender of second Confederate army under Pemberton.
May 21, 1863	Battle of Plains Store	Louisiana	C	Union	Union victory near Baton Rouge.
May 21 – July 9, 1863	Siege of Port Hudson	Louisiana	A	Union	last Confederate stronghold on Mississippi surrenders; Gardner surrenders to Banks.
June 7, 1863	Battle of Milliken's Bend	Louisiana	C	Union	In the largest battle fought between Confederate and Black troops, after nearly two days of close combat, the Confederates were defeated in their attempt to raise the siege of Vicksburg.
June 9, 1863	Battle of Brandy Station	Virginia	B	Inconclusive	Pleasonton surprises J.E.B. Stuart's cavalrymen in their camps near Brandy Station.
June 9, 1863	Battle of Lake Providence	Louisiana	D	Union	Confederates withdraw to Floyd, Louisiana.
June 13–15, 1863	Second Battle of Winchester	Virginia	B	Confederate	Confederate victory paves way for Lee's invasion of the North.
June 17, 1863	Battle of Aldie	Virginia	C	Inconclusive	Indecisive battle during Robert E. Lee's march north.
June 17–19, 1863	Battle of Middleburg	Virginia	C	Inconclusive	J.E.B. Stuart retreats from engagement with Union cavalry.
June 20–21, 1863	Battle of LaFourche Crossing	Louisiana	D	Union	Confederates disengage, and fled to Thibodaux.
June 21, 1863	Battle of Upperville	Virginia	C	Inconclusive	Indecisive cavalry battle during Lee's invasion.
June 24–26, 1863	Battle of Hoover's Gap	Tennessee	C	Union	Union victory prevents Confederates in Tennessee from coming to the aid of Vicksburg.
June 28, 1863	Second Battle of Donaldsonville	Louisiana	D	Union	Confederate forces failed to take Fort Butler.
June 29–30, 1863	Battle of Goodrich's Landing	Louisiana	D	Inconclusive	Confederates drive Union Black Regiments off of several plantations.
June 30, 1863	Battle of Hanover	Pennsylvania	C	Inconclusive	J.E.B. Stuart forced to change his route, delaying his efforts to unite with Lee's force outside Gettysburg.
July 1–2, 1863	Battle of Cabin Creek	Oklahoma (Indian Territory at the time)	C	Union	James Monroe Williams forced Confederate forces to flee.
July 1–3, 1863	Battle of Gettysburg	Pennsylvania	A	Union	Lee loses to Meade, Pickett's Charge fails, ends second invasion of North. Confederate army arrived in Gettysburg to resupply army, unaware of Union army nearby.
July 4, 1863	Battle of Helena	Arkansas	B	Union	Confederate assault on river port fails securing eastern Arkansas for Union.
July 6–16, 1863	Battle of Williamsport	Maryland	C	Inconclusive	Meade and Lee fight indecisive battle.
July 8, 1863	Battle of Boonsboro	Maryland	D	Inconclusive	Indecisive action at rearguard of Lee's retreat.
July 9, 1863	Battle of Corydon	Indiana	C	Confederate	Confederate raid results in civilian casualties, including a Lutheran minister.
July 11, 1863	Battle of Fort Wagner	South Carolina	D	Confederate	first of two Union attempts to take Ft. Wagner.
July 12–13, 1863	Battle of Kock's Plantation	Louisiana	C	Confederate	Union troops retreat to Fort Butler in Donaldsonville, seized during the Second Battle of Donaldsonville.
July 16, 1863	Battle of Grimball's Landing	South Carolina	D	Inconclusive	Union troops retreat from James Island.
July 17, 1863	Battle of Honey Springs	Oklahoma (Indian Territory at the time)	B	Union	In Indian Territory, two largely Black and American Indian forces meet. Union victory.
July 18, 1863	Second Battle of Fort Wagner (Battle of Fort Wagner, Morris Island)	South Carolina	B	Confederate	second of two Union attempts to take Ft. Wagner fails, heroism of the 54th Massachusetts.
July 19, 1863	Battle of Buffington Island	Ohio	C	Union	Confederates captured after failing to find a secure retreat.
July 23, 1863	Battle of Manassas Gap	Virginia	D	Inconclusive	Indecisive battle by day, Confederates withdraw by night.
July 24–25, 1863	Battle of Big Mound	North Dakota (Dakota Territory at the time)	C	Union	Dakota War of 1862: Union forces defeat Santee and Teton Sioux forces.
July 26, 1863	Battle of Dead Buffalo Lake	North Dakota (Dakota Territory at the time)	D	Union	Sioux Wars/Dakota War of 1862: Sibley defeats Sioux forces.
July 26, 1863	Battle of Salineville	Ohio	D	Union	Confederate Brigadier General John Hunt Morgan surrenders in Ohio. The northernmost battle in the Civil War.
July 28, 1863	Battle of Stony Lake	North Dakota (Dakota Territory at the time)	D	Union	Dakota War of 1862: Sioux forces escape Union forces in pursuit.
August 17 – September 9, 1863	Second Battle of Fort Sumter	South Carolina	B	Confederate	Union's massive bombardment and naval attack fails to retake the fort.
July 18 – September 7, 1863	Second Battle of Charleston Harbor	South Carolina	B	Inconclusive	Fort Wagner falls to the Union; Confederates still hold Charleston and Fort Sumter.
August 21, 1863	Second Battle of Chattanooga	Tennessee	D	Union	Union captures town.
August 23, 1863	Lawrence Massacre (Quantrill's Raid)	Kansas	C	Confederate	Quantrill's Raiders pillage the city.
September 1, 1863	Battle of Devil's Backbone	Arkansas	C	Union	Union victory after heavy fighting.
September 3–5, 1863	Battle of Whitestone Hill	North Dakota (Dakota Territory at the time)	D	Union	Sioux Wars/Dakota War of 1862: Union forces defeat several American Indian tribes including the Sioux and Blackfeet.
September 8, 1863	Second Battle of Sabine Pass	Texas	B	Confederate	Confederate forces place stakes in river to help aim their guns at Union ships.
September 10, 1863	Battle of Bayou Fourche	Arkansas	B	Union	Union victory allows for capture of Little Rock.
September 10–11, 1863	Battle of Davis's Cross Roads	Georgia	C	Union	Union forces establish defensive positions prior to Chickamauga.
September 19–20, 1863	Battle of Chickamauga	Georgia	A	Confederate	Bragg defeats Rosecrans, George Thomas of US anointed "The Rock of Chickamauga"
September 22, 1863	Battle of Blountville (Battle of Blountsville)	Tennessee	D	Union	Union forces capture town.
September 29, 1863	Battle of Stirling's Plantation	Louisiana	C	Confederate	Federal troops surrendered after being encircled by cavalry dressed as Union soldiers.
October 6, 1863	Battle of Baxter Springs	Kansas	C	Confederate	Quantrill's Raiders massacre Union Black Troops during U.S. Civil War.
October 10, 1863	Battle of Blue Springs	Tennessee	D	Union	Confederate forces overrun.
October 13, 1863	First Battle of Auburn	Virginia	D	Union	J.E.B. Stuart escapes by hiding in a ravine.
October 14, 1863	Battle of Bristoe Station	Virginia	B	Union	Meade defeats elements of Lee's forces, but Confederates destroy railroad during retreat.
October 14, 1863	Second Battle of Auburn	Virginia	D	Inconclusive	Confederates attack Union rearguard, indecisive.
October 16–18, 1863	Battle of Fort Brooke	Florida	D	Union	Union troops raided the Jean Street Shipyard burning two notorious blockade runners, and disrupting exports.
October 19, 1863	Battle of Buckland Mills	Virginia	D	Confederate	Union cavalry caught in ambush, defeated.
October 25, 1863	Battle of Pine Bluff	Arkansas	D	Union	Confederate attack fails.
October 28–29, 1863	Battle of Wauhatchie	Tennessee	B	Union	Longstreet defeated by Union forces.
November 3, 1863	Battle of Collierville	Tennessee	D	Union	Abortive Confederate attack on the town.
November 6, 1863	Battle of Droop Mountain	West Virginia	B	Union	Union troops forced Confederate forces to retreat to Lewisburg.
November 7, 1863	Second Battle of Rappahannock Station	Virginia	B	Union	Union forces surge across river, forcing Lee to retreat.
November 16, 1863	Battle of Campbell's Station	Tennessee	D	Union	Confederate double-envelopment attempt fails.
November 24, 1863	Battle of Lookout Mountain	Tennessee	A	Union	Joseph Hooker takes Lookout Mountain in the "Battle Above the Clouds". Note: combined with the Battle of Missionary Ridge as Chattanooga III in the CWSAC report.
November 25, 1863	Battle of Missionary Ridge	Tennessee	A	Union	Grant routs Braxton Bragg's army ending the siege of Union forces in Chattanooga. Note: combined with the Battle of Lookout Mountain as Chattanooga III in the CWSAC report.
November 27 – December 2, 1863	Battle of Mine Run	Virginia	B	Inconclusive	Meade bombards Lee's Confederates but then withdraws.
November 27, 1863	Battle of Ringgold Gap	Georgia	B	Confederate	Confederates under Patrick Cleburne defeat Union forces under Joseph Hooker.
November 29, 1863	Battle of Fort Sanders	Tennessee	B	Union	Longstreet unable to take fort due to poor quality gunpowder.
December 14, 1863	Battle of Bean's Station	Tennessee	D	Confederate	Union forces withdraw a short distance.
December 29, 1863	Battle of Mossy Creek	Tennessee	D	Union	Confederate cavalry forced back.
January 17, 1864	Battle of Dandridge	Tennessee	C	Confederate	Union forces withdraw.
January 26, 1864	Battle of Athens	Alabama	D	Union	Union victory in Northern Alabama.
January 27, 1864	Battle of Fair Garden	Tennessee	C	Inconclusive	Union victory followed by withdrawal.
February 6–7, 1864	Battle of Morton's Ford	Virginia	D	Inconclusive	Diversionary Union attack.
February 13, 1864	Battle of Middle Boggy Depot	Oklahoma (Indian Territory at the time)	D	Union	Union troops massacred Confederate forces as the Confederates burned their encampments.
February 14–20, 1864	Battle of Meridian	Mississippi	C	Union	Sherman occupies town.
February 20, 1864	Battle of Olustee	Florida	B	Confederate	Union fails to take Florida.
February 22, 1864	Battle of Okolona	Mississippi	B	Confederate	Confederate cavalry, commanded by Maj. Gen. Nathan Bedford Forrest, routed 7,000 cavalry under the command of Brig. Gen. William Sooy Smith.
February 22–27, 1864	First Battle of Dalton	Georgia	C	Confederate	After several days of intense skirmishing, Maj. Gen. George H. Thomas's army withdrew upon realizing Gen. Joseph E. Johnston's troops could repel any assault. However, the intelligence garnered from the Battle of Dalton helped pave the way for a Union victory in the summer.
March 2, 1864	Battle of Walkerton	Virginia	C	Confederate	controversy surrounding the Dahlgren Affair.
March 12–14, 1864	Battle of Fort DeRussy	Louisiana	B	Union	Fort DeRussy fell and the Red River to Alexandria was open.
March 25, 1864	Battle of Paducah	Kentucky	C	Confederate	Confederate raid by Forrest successful.
April 3–4, 1864	Battle of Elkin's Ferry	Arkansas	C	Union	Confederates unable to prevent Union river crossing.
April 8, 1864	Battle of Mansfield or Sabine Cross Roads	Louisiana	A	Confederate	Banks Union Red River Campaign halted by the Confederates.
April 9–13, 1864	Battle of Prairie D'Ane	Arkansas	B	Union	Frederick Steele defeats Sterling Price.
April 9, 1864	Battle of Pleasant Hill	Louisiana	B	Union	Confederate attack fails.
April 12, 1864	Battle of Fort Pillow	Tennessee	B	Confederate	N.B. Forrest takes fort, massacres black soldiers.
April 12–13, 1864	Battle of Blair's Landing	Louisiana	C	Union	Confederate forces retreated after constant Naval bombardments.
April 17, 1864	Battle of Plymouth	North Carolina	C	Confederate	Confederate land forces, supported by naval ram, retake two Union forts near Plymouth, North Carolina.
April 18, 1864	Battle of Poison Spring	Arkansas	C	Confederate	Part of Red River Campaign in Arkansas, black troops massacred.
April 23, 1864	Battle of Monett's Ferry	Louisiana	C	Union	Confederate forces driven back.
April 25, 1864	Battle of Marks' Mills	Arkansas	D	Confederate	Part of Red River Campaign in Arkansas.
April 30, 1864	Battle of Jenkins' Ferry	Arkansas	C	Union	Part of Red River Campaign in Arkansas.
May 5, 1864	Battle of Albemarle Sound	North Carolina	C	Inconclusive	Indecisive naval battle during U.S. Civil War.
May 5–7, 1864	Battle of the Wilderness	Virginia	A	Inconclusive	Grant and Lee meet inconclusively.
May 6–7, 1864	Battle of Port Walthall Junction	Virginia	C	Union	Union forces destroy railroad
May 7–13, 1864	Battle of Rocky Face Ridge	Georgia	C	Union	Due to a flanking movement by Union troops under Maj. Gen. William Tecumseh Sherman, Confederates led by Gen. Joseph E. Johnston were forced to evacuate their strong position near Atlanta.
May 8–21, 1864	Battle of Spotsylvania Court House	Virginia	A	Inconclusive	Grant and Lee meet inconclusively, Grant writes to Halleck "I propose to fight it out on this line if it takes all summer".
May 9, 1864	Battle of Swift Creek	Virginia	C	Inconclusive	Union forces damage railroad, but are stopped by Confederate forces.
May 9, 1864	Battle of Cloyd's Mountain	Virginia	C	Union	Union victory, Confederate General Albert G. Jenkins killed.
May 10, 1864	Battle of Chester Station	Virginia	D	Inconclusive	Union forces under Benjamin Butler pushed back.
May 10, 1864	Battle of Cove Mountain	Virginia	D	Inconclusive	Union forces under William W. Averell fought off Confederate attack and escaped under cover of the night.
May 11, 1864	Battle of Yellow Tavern	Virginia	C	Union	Union forces win cavalry battle, J.E.B. Stuart is mortally wounded.
May 12–16, 1864	Battle of Proctor's Creek	Virginia	B	Confederate	Beauregard defeats Butler.
May 13, 1864	Battle of Resaca	Georgia	C	Inconclusive	Sherman defeats Johnston
May 15, 1864	Battle of New Market	Virginia	B	Confederate	Confederate forces halt Union army under Franz Sigel from advance up the Shenandoah Valley.
May 16, 1864	Battle of Mansura	Louisiana	C	Union	Confederates are flanked and forced to retreat.
May 17, 1864	Battle of Adairsville	Georgia	C	Union	Failed Confederate attempt to destroy part of the Union force approaching Atlanta.
May 18, 1864	Battle of Yellow Bayou	Louisiana	C	Union	Union and Confederate forces traded ground until both sides retired, with no valuable gain from either side.
May 20, 1864	Battle of Ware Bottom Church	Virginia	C	Confederate	Beauregard boxes Butler in.
May 23–26, 1864	Battle of North Anna	Virginia	B	Inconclusive	Lee outmaneuvers Grant, but because of illness, he is unable to capitalize.
May 24, 1864	Battle of Wilson's Wharf	Virginia	D	Union	Confederates under Fitzhugh Lee defeated by two Union black regiments.
May 25–26, 1864	Battle of New Hope Church	Georgia	C	Confederate	Hooker's forces defeated.
May 26 – June 4, 1864	Battle of Dallas (Georgia)	Georgia	C	Union	Confederate withdrawal in Georgia.
May 27, 1864	Battle of Pickett's Mill	Georgia	C	Confederate	Unsuccessful attack by Sherman on Johnston.
May 28, 1864	Battle of Haw's Shop	Virginia	C	Union	Union advance halted.
May 28–30, 1864	Battle of Totopotomoy Creek	Virginia	B	Inconclusive	Union forces pushed back.
May 30, 1864	Battle of Old Church	Virginia	C	Union	Union forces drive Confederates back to Cold Harbor.
May 31 – June 12, 1864	Battle of Cold Harbor	Virginia	A	Confederate	Lee repulses Grant, Confederate soldier says "We felt it was murder, not war".
June 5, 1864	Battle of Piedmont	Virginia	B	Union	Union forces under David Hunter defeat Confederate defenses on march to Staunton, Virginia, upper Shenandoah Valley.
June 6, 1864	Battle of Old River Lake	Arkansas	C	Union	Colton Greene failed to prevent Union advance.
June 6 – July 3, 1864	Battle of Marietta	Georgia	B	Union	Confederates withdrew; Leonidas Polk † is killed.
June 9, 1864	First Battle of Petersburg	Virginia	D	Confederate	Beauregard defeats Butler.
June 10, 1864	Battle of Brice's Crossroads	Mississippi	B	Confederate	N.B. Forrest routs Union force almost three times as large.
June 11–12, 1864	Battle of Cynthiana	Kentucky	C	Union	Union Brig. Gen. Stephen Gano Burbridge defeated Confederate Brig. Gen. John Hunt Morgan. Most Confederate soldiers were casualties, though Morgan escaped.
June 11–12, 1864	Battle of Trevilian Station	Virginia	B	Confederate	Confederate victory, George Armstrong Custer nearly surrounded and has to be rescued by Sheridan.
June 15–18, 1864	Second Battle of Petersburg	Virginia	A	Confederate	Lee repulses Grant at back door to Richmond.
June 17–18, 1864	Battle of Lynchburg	Virginia	B	Confederate	Fake Confederate reinforcements lead to Union retreat.
June 21–24, 1864	Battle of Jerusalem Plank Road	Virginia	B	Inconclusive	Union siege lines extended for Siege of Petersburg.
June 22, 1864	Battle of Kolb's Farm	Georgia	C	Union	Confederate attack fails due to poor terrain conditions.
June 24, 1864	Battle of Saint Mary's Church	Virginia	D	Inconclusive	Union forces fight a successful delaying action.
June 25, 1864	Battle of Staunton River Bridge	Virginia	C	Confederate	Union troops failed to take the Staunton River Bridge.
June 27, 1864	Battle of Kennesaw Mountain	Georgia	B	Confederate	Johnston repulses Sherman.
June 28, 1864	Battle of Sappony Church	Virginia	D	Confederate	Union forces were forced into a chaotic retreat.
June 29, 1864	First Battle of Ream's Station	Virginia	C	Confederate	Maj. Gen. William Mahone and Brig. Gen. Fitzhugh Lee defeated Union cavalry raiding Confederate railroads south of Petersburg, Virginia.
July 9, 1864	Battle of Monocacy (Battle of Monocacy Junction)	Maryland	B	Confederate	Union Gen. Lew Wallace slows up Jubal Early, saving DC.
July 11–12, 1864	Battle of Fort Stevens	District of Columbia	B	Union	Failed Confederate attempt to capture Washington, D.C., President Lincoln, observing the battle, comes under Confederate fire.
July 14–15, 1864	Battle of Tupelo	Mississippi	B	Union	Confederate forces under Stephen D. Lee are defeated and Nathan Bedford Forrest is wounded in action.
July 18–19, 1864	Battle of Cool Spring	Virginia	C	Confederate	Joseph Thoburn led a full retreat after being surrounded by Confederate forces.
July 20, 1864	Battle of Peachtree Creek	Georgia	B	Union	(Atlanta campaign) First Confederate attack against Union forces north of Atlanta fails.
July 20, 1864	Battle of Rutherford's Farm	Virginia	D	Union	Confederates under Jubal Early caught by surprise and defeated.
July 22, 1864	Battle of Atlanta	Georgia	B	Union	(Atlanta campaign) Sherman turns back Hood's attack east of Atlanta.
July 24, 1864	Second Battle of Kernstown	Virginia	B	Confederate	Jubal Early defeats Union forces.
July 27–29, 1864	First Battle of Deep Bottom	Virginia	C	Confederate	Union forces besieged Confederate positions, but the Confederates held their ground.
July 28, 1864	Battle of Ezra Church	Georgia	B	Union	(Atlanta campaign) Confederate attack on Union army northwest of Atlanta fails to gain element of surprise, finding entrenched Union forces. Union victory.
July 28–29, 1864	Battle of Killdeer Mountain	North Dakota (Dakota Territory at the time)	C	Union	Sioux Wars/Dakota War of 1862: Union forces defeat Sioux.
July 30, 1864	Battle of the Crater	Virginia	A	Confederate	Lee defeats Burnside.
August 1, 1864	Battle of Folck's Mill	Maryland	D	Inconclusive	Indecisive Civil War battle.
August 2–23, 1864	Battle of Mobile Bay	Alabama	A	Union	David Farragut takes port, says "Damn the torpedoes, full speed ahead".
August 5–7, 1864	Battle of Utoy Creek	Georgia	C	Inconclusive	(Atlanta campaign) Indecisive battle on Union right flank near Atlanta.
August 7, 1864	Battle of Moorefield	West Virginia	C	Union	Union forces routed Confederates, forcing them to scatter from Moorefield.
August 14–15, 1864	Second Battle of Dalton	Georgia	D	Union	Union forces withstand attack until relieved.
August 14–20, 1864	Second Battle of Deep Bottom	Virginia	B	Confederate	The Confederates drove back the Union threat, but at a cost of diluting their forces as the Union had hoped.
August 16, 1864	Battle of Guard Hill	Virginia	C	Inconclusive	Federals successfully counterattacked against the Confederates, resulting in a chaotic Confederate retreat.
August 18–21, 1864	Battle of Globe Tavern	Virginia	B	Union	Confederate forces lose control of railroads at Petersburg.
August 20, 1864	Battle of Lovejoy's Station	Georgia	D	Confederate	Confederates repel Union raiders attacking the station.
August 21, 1864	Second Battle of Memphis	Tennessee	C	Union	Partially successful Confederate raid.
August 21, 1864	Battle of Summit Point	West Virginia	C	Inconclusive	Union and Confederate forces traded dominance at Summit Point.
August 25, 1864	Second Battle of Ream's Station	Virginia	B	Confederate	Union lines overrun by Confederates.
August 25–29, 1864	Battle of Smithfield Crossing	West Virginia	D	Inconclusive	Confederate forces routed a small Union detachment, but a Union counterattacked stopped the Confederates; ultimately ending the last engagement in West Virginia of the Civil War.
August 31 – September 1, 1864	Battle of Jonesborough	Georgia	A	Union	William J. Hardee's Confederates defeated, resulting in Atlanta's fall the following day.
September 3–4, 1864	Battle of Berryville	Virginia	C	Inconclusive	At the same time Confederate Lt. Gen. Jubal A. Early sent Maj. Gen. Joseph B. Kershaw's division to attack Colonel Joseph Thoburn's division of the VIII Corps, and Kershaw initially routed Thoburn's left flank. Darkness ended the fighting. The next morning, Early, seeing the strength of the Union's entrenched line, retreated behind Opequon Creek.
September 19, 1864	Battle of Opequon (Third Battle of Winchester)	Virginia	A	Union	Sheridan defeats Early, several officers killed or wounded on both sides.
September 21–22, 1864	Battle of Fisher's Hill	Virginia	B	Union	Successful Union frontal assault.
September 27, 1864	Battle of Fort Davidson (Battle of Pilot Knob)	Missouri	B	Union	Union forces detonate their own fort after losing to Confederates.
September 29–30, 1864	Battle of Chaffin's Farm (New Market Heights)	Virginia	B	Union	Union forces victorious, but fail to capture several forts.
September 30 – October 2, 1864	Battle of Peebles' Farm	Virginia	B	Union	Union victory near Petersburg.
October 1–3, 1864	First Battle of Saltville	Virginia	C	Confederate	Confederates defeat Union Black Cavalry, war crimes committed against captured blacks.
October 5, 1864	Battle of Allatoona	Georgia	B	Union	Union fortifications hold.
October 7, 1864	Battle of Darbytown and New Market	Virginia	C	Union	John Gregg is killed, Confederates withdraw to Richmond.
October 9, 1864	Battle of Tom's Brook	Virginia	C	Union	Union cavalry defeats Confederates.
October 13, 1864	Battle of Darbytown Road	Virginia	D	Confederate	Federal assault on Confederate fortifications repulsed with heavy casualties.
October 15, 1864	Battle of Glasgow	Missouri	C	Confederate	Union forces surrender.
October 19, 1864	Second Battle of Lexington	Missouri	D	Confederate	Union forces driven out of town.
October 19, 1864	Battle of Cedar Creek	Virginia	A	Union	Sheridan defeats Early, drives Confederates from Shenandoah Valley.
October 21, 1864	Battle of Little Blue River	Missouri	D	Confederate	Confederate victory in Missouri.
October 22–23, 1864	Battle of Byram's Ford	Missouri	B	Union	Confederates under Marmaduke defeated.
October 22, 1864	Second Battle of Independence	Missouri	C	Inconclusive	Union forces occupy town.
October 23, 1864	Battle of Westport	Missouri	A	Union	Union forces win decisive battle to take control of Missouri.
October 25, 1864	Battle of Marais des Cygnes	Kansas	C	Union	Price's Confederates pursued into Kansas.
October 25, 1864	Battle of Mine Creek	Kansas	C	Union	Price's army crushed, flees back into Missouri.
October 25, 1864	Battle of Marmiton River	Missouri	D	Union	Price escapes Union pursuit.
October 26–29, 1864	Battle of Decatur	Alabama	C	Union	Confederates unable to cross river.
October 27–28, 1864	Battle of Boydton Plank Road	Virginia	B	Confederate	Union forces take control of road, but withdraw after battle.
October 27–28, 1864	Battle of Fair Oaks & Darbytown Road	Virginia	C	Confederate	Confederates repel a Union attack.
October 28, 1864	Second Battle of Newtonia	Missouri	B	Union	James G. Blunt defeats Joseph O. Shelby.
November 4–5, 1864	Battle of Johnsonville	Tennessee	B	Confederate	Confederates bombard Union forces during the night after a fire starts near union positions.
November 11–13, 1864	Battle of Bull's Gap	Tennessee	D	Confederate	Minor Confederate victory during U.S. Civil War.
November 22, 1864	Battle of Griswoldville	Georgia	B	Union	Sherman's march to the sea continued.
November 24, 1864	Battle of Columbia	Tennessee	C	Confederate	Confederates divert attention.
November 28, 1864	Battle of Buck Head Creek	Georgia	C	Union	Union forces repel a Confederate attack.
November 29, 1864	Battle of Spring Hill	Tennessee	B	Union	Confederate mistakes allow Federal forces to redeploy, leading to the Battle of Franklin.
November 29, 1864	Sand Creek massacre	Colorado (Colorado Territory at the time)	B	Union	Colorado War: U.S. forces massacre Cheyenne and Arapaho.
November 30, 1864	Battle of Honey Hill	South Carolina	C	Confederate	The third battle of Sherman's March to the Sea was a failed Union Army expedition under Maj. Gen. John P. Hatch that attempted to cut off the Charleston and Savannah Railroad in support of Sherman's projected arrival in Savannah.
November 30, 1864	Battle of Franklin (1864)	Tennessee	A	Union	Hood attacks Schofield but suffers crushing losses; Pickett's Charge of the West.
December 4, 1864	Battle of Waynesboro, Georgia	Georgia	C	Union	Kilpatrick stops Wheeler from attacking Sherman.
December 5–7, 1864	Third Battle of Murfreesboro	Tennessee	D	Union	Confederate raid mostly unsuccessful.
December 7–27, 1864	First Battle of Fort Fisher	North Carolina	C	Confederate	Failed Union attempt to take fort.
December 13, 1864	Second Battle of Fort McAllister	Georgia	B	Union	William B. Hazen captures Fort McAllister.
December 15–16, 1864	Battle of Nashville	Tennessee	A	Union	Thomas attacks and virtually destroys Hood's Confederate Army of Tennessee.
December 17–18, 1864	Battle of Marion	Virginia	D	Union	Union forces destroy beneficial infrastructure.
December 20–21, 1864	Second Battle of Saltville	Virginia	C	Union	Confederate forces retreated, and General George Stoneman's troops entered the town and destroyed the saltworks.
January 13–15, 1865	Second Battle of Fort Fisher	North Carolina	A	Union	Union takes fort.
February 3, 1865	Battle of Rivers' Bridge	South Carolina	D	Union	Union forces capture river crossing.
February 5–7, 1865	Battle of Hatcher's Run	Virginia	B	Union	Union force launch unexpected attack.
February 22, 1865	Battle of Wilmington (North Carolina)	North Carolina	D	Union	Last Confederate port falls.
March 2, 1865	Battle of Waynesboro, Virginia	Virginia	B	Union	Remnants of Confederate Army of the Valley are destroyed.
March 6, 1865	Battle of Natural Bridge	Florida	C	Confederate	Confederate victory in Florida prevents the capture of Tallahassee.
March 7–10, 1865	Battle of Wyse Fork	North Carolina	D	Union	Confederate attacks repelled by Union artillery.
March 10, 1865	Battle of Monroe's Cross Roads	North Carolina	D	Inconclusive	Confederates delayed Federal Cavalry movement towards Fayetteville.
March 16, 1865	Battle of Averasborough	North Carolina	C	Inconclusive	Union and Confederate forces attack one another in turn, both attacks fail.
March 19–21, 1865	Battle of Bentonville	North Carolina	A	Union	Sherman defeats Confederates
March 25, 1865	Battle of Fort Stedman	Virginia	A	Union	Lee attempts to break siege.
March 27 – April 8, 1865	Battle of Spanish Fort	Alabama	B	Union	Union forces capture fort just east of Mobile.
March 29, 1865	Battle of Lewis's Farm	Virginia	C	Union	Union forces capture Confederate earthworks.
March 31, 1865	Battle of White Oak Road	Virginia	B	Union	Confederate forces under Richard H. Anderson defeated.
March 31, 1865	Battle of Dinwiddie Court House	Virginia	C	Confederate	Pickett defeats Sheridan.
April 1, 1865	Battle of Five Forks	Virginia	A	Union	Sheridan routs Confederates.
April 2, 1865	Battle of Selma	Alabama	B	Union	Wilson defeats Forrest.
April 2, 1865	Third Battle of Petersburg	Virginia	A	Union	Grant defeats Lee.
April 2, 1865	Battle of Sutherland's Station	Virginia	C	Union	Lee's supply lines are cut.
April 3, 1865	Battle of Namozine Church	Virginia	D	Inconclusive	Several Confederates captured, Custer's brother earns Medal of Honor.
April 5, 1865	Battle of Amelia Springs	Virginia	C	Inconclusive	Confederates forced Union troops to retreat, however Union forces linked up and prevented another counter-attack.
April 6, 1865	Battle of Rice's Station	Virginia	D	Union	Confederate forces are caught off guard by John Gibbon's forces.
April 6, 1865	Battle of Sayler's Creek (or Sailor's Creek)	Virginia	B	Union	Lee realizes his army is on the verge of defeat.
April 6–7, 1865	Battle of High Bridge	Virginia	C	Inconclusive	Union forces thwart Lee's attempts to burn bridges and to resupply, Grant proposes that Lee surrender, but he refuses.
April 7, 1865	Battle of Cumberland Church	Virginia	C	Confederate	Union forces attack Confederate rearguard, but darkness cuts the attack short.
April 8, 1865	Battle of Appomattox Station	Virginia	B	Union	Union forces thwart Lee's final attempt to resupply.
April 9, 1865	Battle of Appomattox Court House	Virginia	A	Union	Lee's forces surrounded. He subsequently surrenders.
April 9, 1865	Battle of Fort Blakeley	Alabama	A	Union	Union forces capture fort east of Mobile.
May 12–13, 1865	Battle of Palmito Ranch	Texas	D	Confederate	Last battle in Texas during final phases of the Civil War. Southernmost battle on land in Civil War.

== Other USA/CSA battles ==
Other non-Indian wars battles and skirmishes not rated by CWSAC.

USA/CSA Battles not rated by CWSAC
Date	Battle	State	Outcome	
Date	Battle	State	Victory	Notes
May 7, 1861	Battle of Gloucester Point	Virginia	Inconclusive	Earliest exchange of gunfire between the Union Navy and organized Rebel forces after the surrender of Fort Sumter
June 1, 1861	Battle of Fairfax Court House (1861)	Virginia	Inconclusive	First land skirmish of the war with fatal casualties.
June 1, 1861	Battle of Arlington Mills	Virginia	Inconclusive	Small skirmish in Arlington County just after Fairfax Court House
June 5, 1861	Battle of Pig Point	Virginia	Confederate	Early skirmish between Union gunboat USS Harriet Lane and a shore battery and rifle company of CSA defenders at Pig Point in Portsmouth, Virginia near Hampton Roads, Virginia.
June 19, 1861	Battle of Cole Camp	Missouri	Confederate	Pro-Confederate Missouri State Guard defeat pro-Union Missouri Home Guard at Cole Camp
June 27, 1861	Battle of Mathias Point	Virginia	Confederate	Confederates repulse the Union attack and kill Commander James H. Ward of the Union Potomac Flotilla, the first Union Navy officer killed during the Civil War.
July 13, 1861	Battle of Corrick's Ford	West Virginia (Virginia at the time)	Union	Confederate Brig. Gen. Robert S. Garnett is the first general killed in the Civil War.
July 17, 1861	Battle of Scary Creek	West Virginia (Virginia at the time)	Confederate	General Cox skirmishes with Confederates in the in Kanawha Valley.
July 25, 1861	First Battle of Mesilla	New Mexico (New Mexico Territory at the time)	Confederate	Confederate victory secures the southern part of the New Mexico Territory for the CSA.
August 5, 1861	Battle of Athens	Missouri / Iowa	Union	Union victory in small skirmish on the Iowa-Missouri border
August 19, 1861	Battle of Charleston (1861) (Missouri)	Missouri	Union	Union force destroys Confederate camp.
September 11, 1861	Battle of Lewinsville	Virginia	Inconclusive	Minor battle between Confederates under J. E. B. Stuart and Union troops under McClellan in Fairfax County
September 24–25, 1861	Battle of Canada Alamosa	New Mexico (New Mexico Territory at the time)	Confederate	One of several small cavalry skirmishes in Confederate Arizona near the border with Union New Mexico Territory.
October 5, 1861	Battle of Cockle Creek	Virginia	Union	Confederate smuggling up the Chincoteague Bay ends.
October 12, 1861	Battle of the Head of Passes	Louisiana	Confederate	Naval forces square-off at the mouth of the Mississippi River.
November 3–7, 1861	Battle of Port Royal	South Carolina	Union	Union fleet under S. F. Du Pont capture Confederate forts at Hilton Head, South Carolina.
December 19, 1861	Skirmish at Blackwater Creek	Missouri	Union	Union forces under General Pope capture a newly recruited Missouri State Guard regiment.
December 28, 1861	Battle of Sacramento	Kentucky	Confederate	Nathan Bedford Forrest's first victory. The Federals are surprised and quickly routed.
February 10, 1862	Battle of Elizabeth City	North Carolina	Union	Destruction of the Mosquito Fleet.
March 30, 1862	Battle of Stanwix Station	Arizona (New Mexico Territory at the time)	Union	Westernmost skirmish of the war.
April 14, 1862	Battle of Peralta	New Mexico (New Mexico Territory at the time)	Union	Union forces defeat the 5th Texas Mounted Volunteers.
April 15, 1862	Battle of Picacho Pass	Arizona (New Mexico Territory at the time)	Confederate	Confederate pickets defeat Union cavalry patrol.
May 19, 1862	Battle of Whitney's Lane	Arkansas	Union	Union campaign towards Little Rock, Arkansas halted.
May 20, 1862	Capture of Tucson (1862)	Arizona (New Mexico Territory at the time)	Union	A Union force of 2,000 took the city from ten Tucson militiamen without a shot fired.
May 23, 1862	Battle of Lewisburg	West Virginia (Virginia at the time)	Union	Troops under Union Gen. George Crook defeat Confederate forces under Gen. Henry Heth
May 29, 1862	First Battle of Pocotaligo	South Carolina	Union	Mission objective fulfilled – Charleston & Savannah railroad bridge damaged.
June 6, 1862	Battle of Good's Farm	Virginia	Confederate	Skirmish during Jackson's Valley campaign where Turner Ashby was killed.
August 10, 1862	Battle of the Nueces	Texas	Confederate	Union forces massacred by Confederates at Nueces Creek, Texas.
August 11, 1862	Battle of Compton's Ferry	Missouri	Union	Union forces defeat Confederate forces as they attempted a chaotic retreat.
September 1, 1862	Battle of Britton's Lane	Tennessee	Confederate	Union forces suffered heavy losses to Confederate forces.
September 13, 1862	Battle of Charleston (1862)	West Virginia (Virginia at the time)	Confederate	Confederate troops occupy Charleston during Kanawha Valley offensive.
September 14, 1862	Battle of Crampton's Gap	Maryland	Union	Union broke the Confederate line and drove through the gap. Confederates were strategically successful in stalling the Union advance and protecting the rear of their forces engaged at Harpers Ferry.
October 10–12, 1862	Raid on Chambersburg	Pennsylvania	Inconclusive	Stuart's cavalry moves into Pennsylvania after the Battle of Antietam
October 22, 1862	Battle of Pocotaligo	South Carolina	Confederate	Union troops repulsed after minimally damaging the Charleston & Savannah railroad.
October 27–29, 1862	Skirmish at Island Mound	Missouri	Union	Confederate attack and melee fails.
October 31–November 2, 1862	Battle of Unison	Virginia	Inconclusive	Stuart's cavalry skirmishes with Union cavalry
December 28, 1862	Battle of Van Buren	Arkansas	Union	Union forces secure Northwest Arkansas
February 3 – April 12, 1863	Yazoo Pass Expedition	Mississippi	Confederate	Elaborate amphibious Union flanking maneuver is thwarted by Confederates at Fort Pemberton during the Vicksburg campaign.
March 1, 1864	Skirmish at Cedar Creek	Florida	Inconclusive	Confederates raid near Union occupied Jacksonville.
April 30, 1863	Battle of Day's Gap	Alabama	Confederate	Nathan Bedford Forrest and Union Col. Abel Streight fight Cavalry action for several hours.
June 27, 1863	Battle of Portland Harbor	Maine	Union	Naval engagement.
June 30, 1863	Battle of Sporting Hill	Pennsylvania	Inconclusive	Small skirmish during the Gettysburg Campaign was the northernmost engagement of Robert E. Lee's Army of Northern Virginia during the Civil War.
July 1, 1863	Battle of Carlisle	Pennsylvania	Inconclusive	Small, but strategically important skirmish during the Gettysburg Campaign.
July 2, 1863	Battle of Hunterstown	Pennsylvania	Inconclusive	Minor cavalry engagement during the Gettysburg Campaign
July 3, 1863	Battle of Fairfield	Pennsylvania	Confederate	Cavalry engagement during the Gettysburg Campaign secured the important Hagerstown Road.
July 4, 1863	Battle of Tebbs Bend	Kentucky	Union	Union infantry defeats Confederate cavalry.
July 4-5, 1863	Fight at Monterey Pass	Pennsylvania	Union	Cavalry under Union General Judson Kilpatrick attacked Confederate forces retreating from Gettysburg.
July 5–25, 1863	Jackson Expedition	Mississippi	Union	Forces under General William T. Sherman clear General Joseph E. Johnston's relief effort from the Vicksburg area.
July 10, 1863	Battle of Funkstown	Maryland	Inconclusive	Action during Lee's retreat to Virginia after the Battle of Gettysburg.
July 13–16, 1863	Draft Riots	New York	N/A	The Draft Riots caused a strain on the Union army, and vast amounts of corruption within the draft began to spread from New York to the frontlines.
July 18, 1863	Wytheville Raid	Virginia	Union	Action by mounted forces under Union Colonel John Toland
August 21, 1863	Skirmish near Brooklyn, Kansas	Kansas	Inconclusive	Union forces pursue Quantrill's Raiders after the Lawrence Massacre.
August 26–27, 1863	Battle of White Sulphur Springs	West Virginia	Confederate	A confederate brigade halts a Union cavalry raid
August 27, 1863	Battle of Bayou Meto (Battle of Reed's Bridge)	Arkansas	Confederate	Confederate forces delay the Union advance on Little Rock.
October 21, 1863	Battle of Cherokee Station	Alabama	Union	Confederates suffered heavy losses and retreated after an hour long musket battle.
October 10, 1863	Battle of James City	Virginia	Confederate	Opening of the Bristoe campaign
October 27, 1863	Battle of Brown's Ferry	Tennessee	Union	Union forces open the "Cracker Line", a supply line to Chattanooga through Brown's Ferry.
November 3, 1863	Battle of Bayou Bourbeux	Louisiana	Confederate	Confederate District of Western Louisiana troops attack the isolated rear guard during Union withdrawal from Opelousas.
November 6, 1863	Battle of Rogersville	Tennessee	Confederate	Confederate forces under Brig Gen "Grumble" Jones captures 775 prisoners of the 2nd East Tennessee (Union) Infantry Regiment and the 7th Ohio Cavalry.
March 18, 1864	Battle of Laredo	Texas	Confederate	Union force sent to destroy 5,000 bales of cotton
April 13–14, 1864	Battle of Salyersville	Kentucky	Union	Confederates were driven into Salyersville with heavy losses.
May 6, 1864	Battle of Calcasieu Pass	Louisiana	Confederate	Confederates capture two Union gunboats.
May 12, 1864	Battle of Meadow Bridge	Virginia	Union	Sheridan forces a crossing of the Chickahominy River during the Overland Campaign
June 19, 1864	Battle of Cherbourg (1864) (Sinking of CSS Alabama)	(Naval engagement) Cherbourg, France	Union	USS Kearsarge sinks CSS Alabama
July 13, 1864	Battle of Camden Point	Missouri	Union	Confederates were ambushed; Camden Point is scorched.
July 30, 1864	Battle of Brown's Mill	Georgia	Confederate	Cavalry engagement during Atlanta campaign
July 31, 1864	Battle of Fort Smith	Arkansas	Union	Federal troops maintain control of western Arkansas
August 17, 1864	Battle of Gainesville	Florida	Confederate	Union failed to take Gainesville, retreated.
September 23–25, 1864	Battle of Sulphur Creek Trestle	Alabama	Confederate	Raid to disrupt Sherman's supply line
September 27, 1864	Battle of Marianna	Florida	Union	Cavalry raid into Florida panhandle.
October 15, 1864	Capture of Sedalia	Missouri	Confederate	Confederate cavalry defeat Union militia
October 19, 1864	St. Albans raid	Vermont	Confederate	Northernmost land action of the American Civil War
October 28, 1864	Battle of Ladiga	Alabama	Confederate	Ferguson's Brigade, Jackson's Cavalry Division defends approaches to Jacksonville along Terrapin Creek to Coloma, Alabama.
October 28, 1864	Battle of Morristown	Tennessee	Union	Union troops route Confederate forces protecting the railroad junction at Morristown
December 24, 1864	Battle of Anthony's Hill (Battle of King's Hill)	Tennessee	Confederate	Forrest turns back Union pursuers after the Battle of Nashville.
January 23–25, 1865	Battle of Trent's Reach	Virginia	Union	One of the last naval battles of the war.
February 2, 1865	Battle of Broxton Bridge	South Carolina	Union	Confederate forces forced to retreat from Broxton Bridge after a failed defense.
February 11, 1865	Battle of Aiken	South Carolina	Confederate	Cavalry action between Union Maj. Gen. Hugh Judson Kilpatrick and Confederate Maj. Gen. Joseph Wheeler.
February 20, 1865	Battle of Fort Myers	Florida	Union	Southernmost land battle in Florida of the war.
April 13–15, 1865	Battle of Morrisville	North Carolina	Union	Last cavalry battle of the War.
April 16, 1865	Battle of West Point	Georgia	Union	Union victory during final phase of U.S. Civil War.
April 16, 1865	Battle of Columbus (1865) (Battle of Girard)	Georgia	Union	Union forces massacred retreating Confederates.
April 23, 1865	Battle of Munford	Alabama	Union	Croxton's Raid in northeast Alabama.
May 1, 1865	Battle of Anderson	South Carolina	Confederate	Minor skirmish, Union and Confederates clashed, Confederate forces repelled Union troops, with cavalry and cadet forces.

== Other battles in the American Indian Wars ==
Other battles and skirmishes, not rated by CWSAC, of the American Indian Wars between either USA or CSA forces and the Apache, Arapaho, Cheyenne, Comanche, Dakota, Kiowa, Navajo, and Shoshone which occurred during the American Civil War – including: the Apache Wars, Colorado War, Dakota War of 1862, Navajo Wars, and Texas–Indian wars.

Other battles in the American Indian Wars
Date	Battle	State	Outcome
August 1861	Siege of Tubac	Arizona (New Mexico Territory at the time)	Apache victory. Confederate militia and townspeople flee to Tucson.
May 5, 1862	First Battle of Dragoon Springs	Arizona (New Mexico Territory at the time)	Apache victory. Westernmost Confederate battle fatalities.
May 9, 1862	Second Battle of Dragoon Springs	Arizona (New Mexico Territory at the time)	Confederate victory. Livestock recaptured.
July 15–16, 1862	Battle of Apache Pass	Arizona (New Mexico Territory at the time)	Apache Wars: Union soldiers fight with Apache warriors.
August 19 and 23, 1862	Battles of New Ulm	Minnesota	Dakota War of 1862: Two battles in the Dakota War of 1862.
September 2, 1862	Battle of Birch Coulee	Minnesota	Dakota War of 1862: Worst defeat of Union forces during the Dakota War of 1862.
September 3, 1862	Battle of Acton	Minnesota	Engagement during the Dakota War of 1862 – a detachment of the 10th Minnesota Infantry Regiment withdraws to the fortified town of Hutchinson, Minnesota.
January 12–14, 1864	Battle of Canyon de Chelly	Arizona (Arizona Territory at the time)	US victory
November 25, 1864	First Battle of Adobe Walls	Texas	Texas–Indian wars: Kit Carson fights Kiowa forces to a draw, but manages to destroy their settlement.
January 8, 1865	Battle of Dove Creek	Texas	Kickapoo victory: Texas State Militia and CS troops are defeated by Kickapoo Indians.
February 17, 1865	Battle of Fort Buchanan	Arizona (Arizona Territory at the time)	Apache victory. Fort Buchanan destroyed.

== Troop engagements ==
This is a chronological summary and record of every engagement between the troops of the Union and of the Confederacy, showing the total losses and casualties in each engagement. It was collated and compiled from the Official Records of the War Department.

This summary has been divided by year:

- 1861
- 1862
- 1863
- 1864
- 1865

== Maps showing American Civil War military campaigns and battles ==
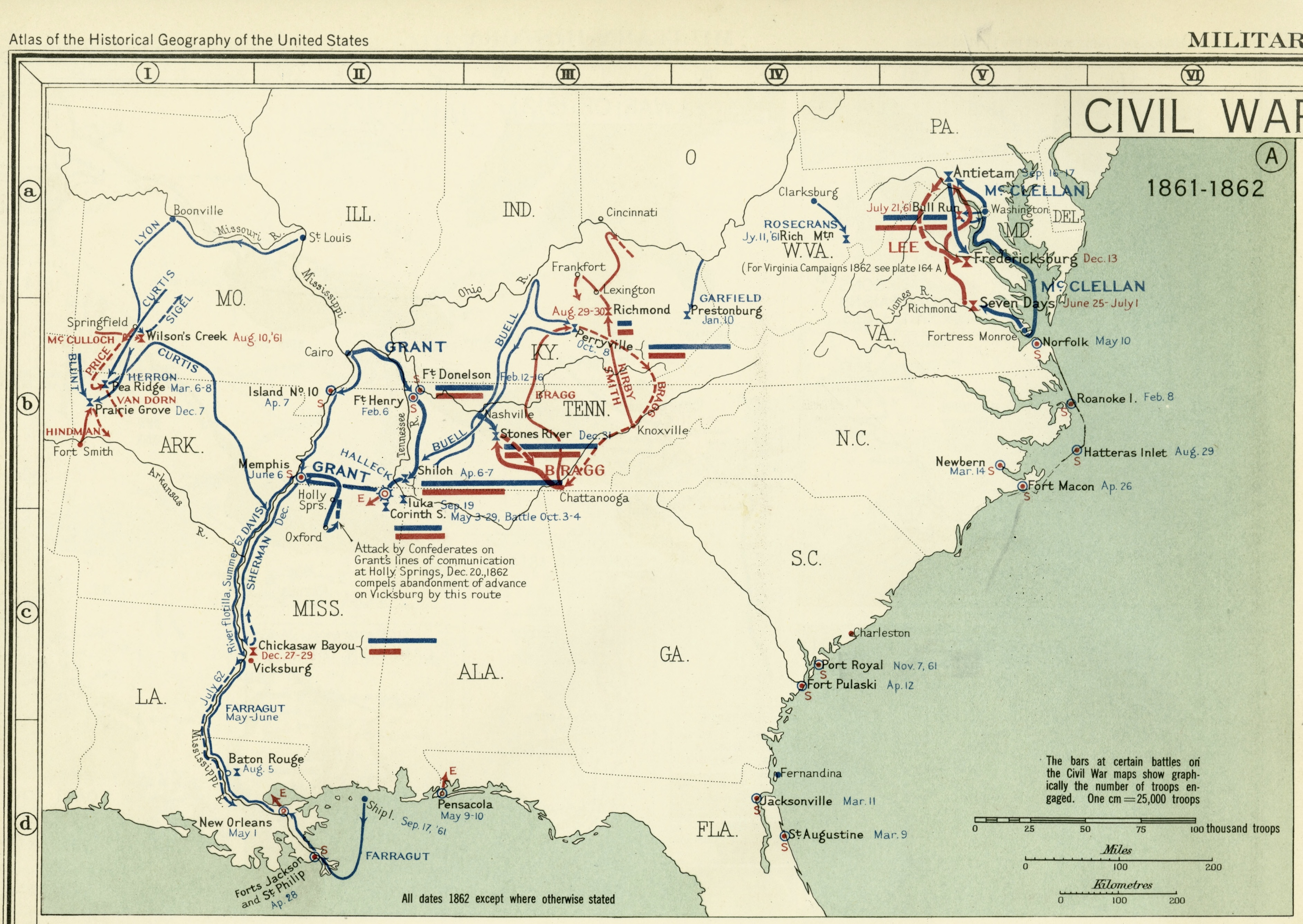
The American Civil War in 1861-1862.

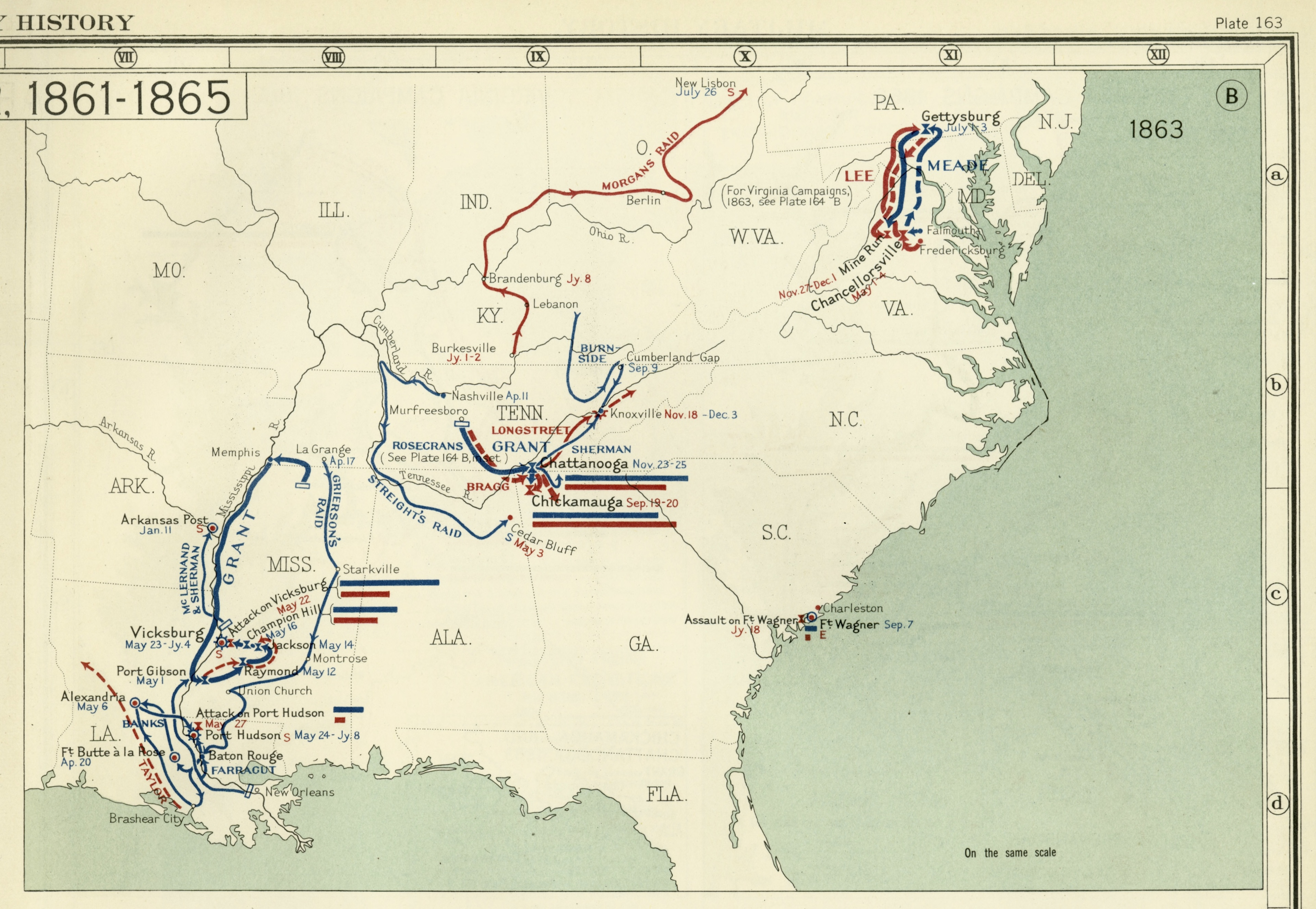
The American Civil War in 1863.

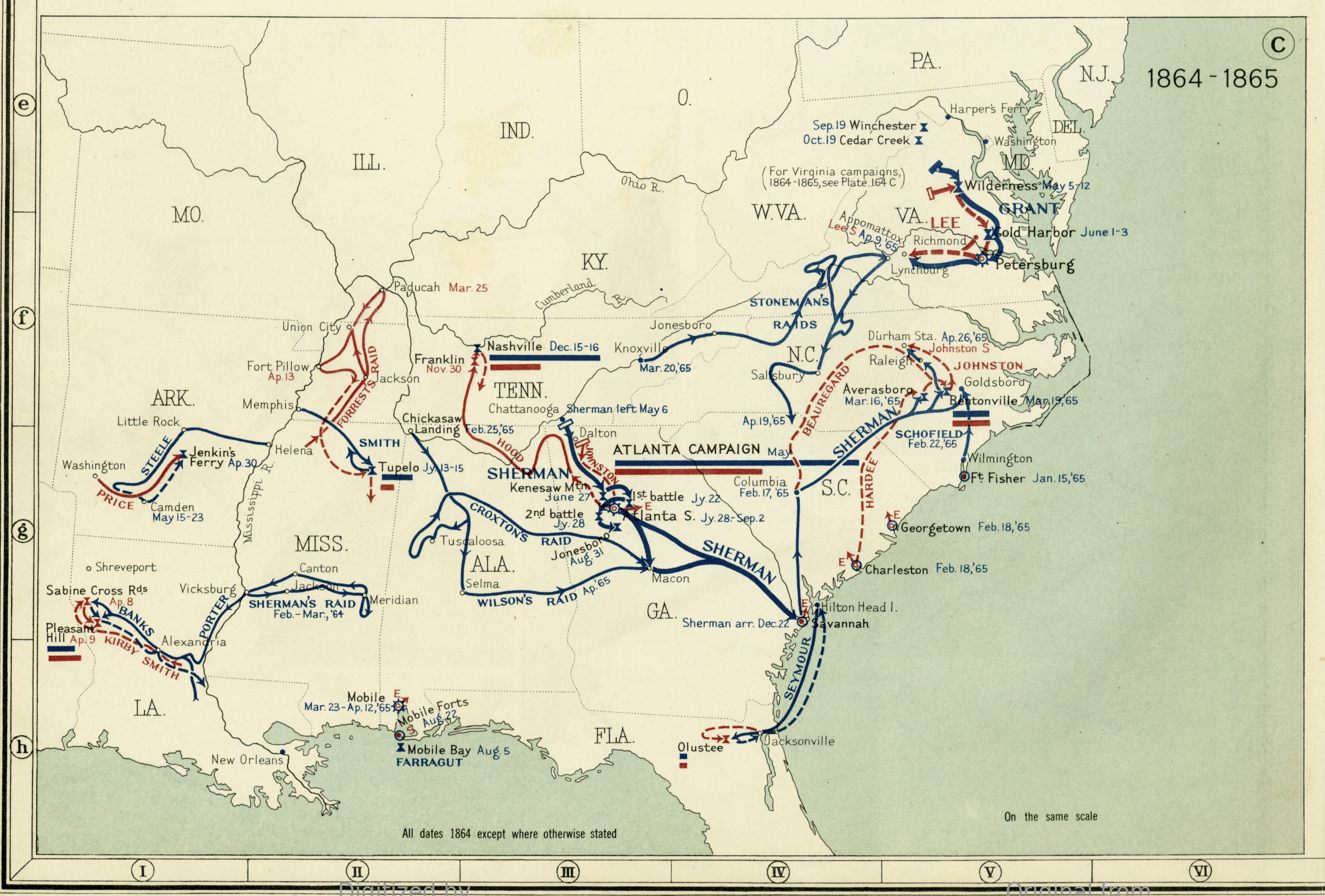
The American Civil War in 1864-1865.

== See also ==
- List of costliest American Civil War land battles
- Timeline of events leading to the American Civil War
- Bibliography of the American Civil War
- Bibliography of Ulysses S. Grant
