= David L. Cockley =

American Civil War Medal of Honor recipient

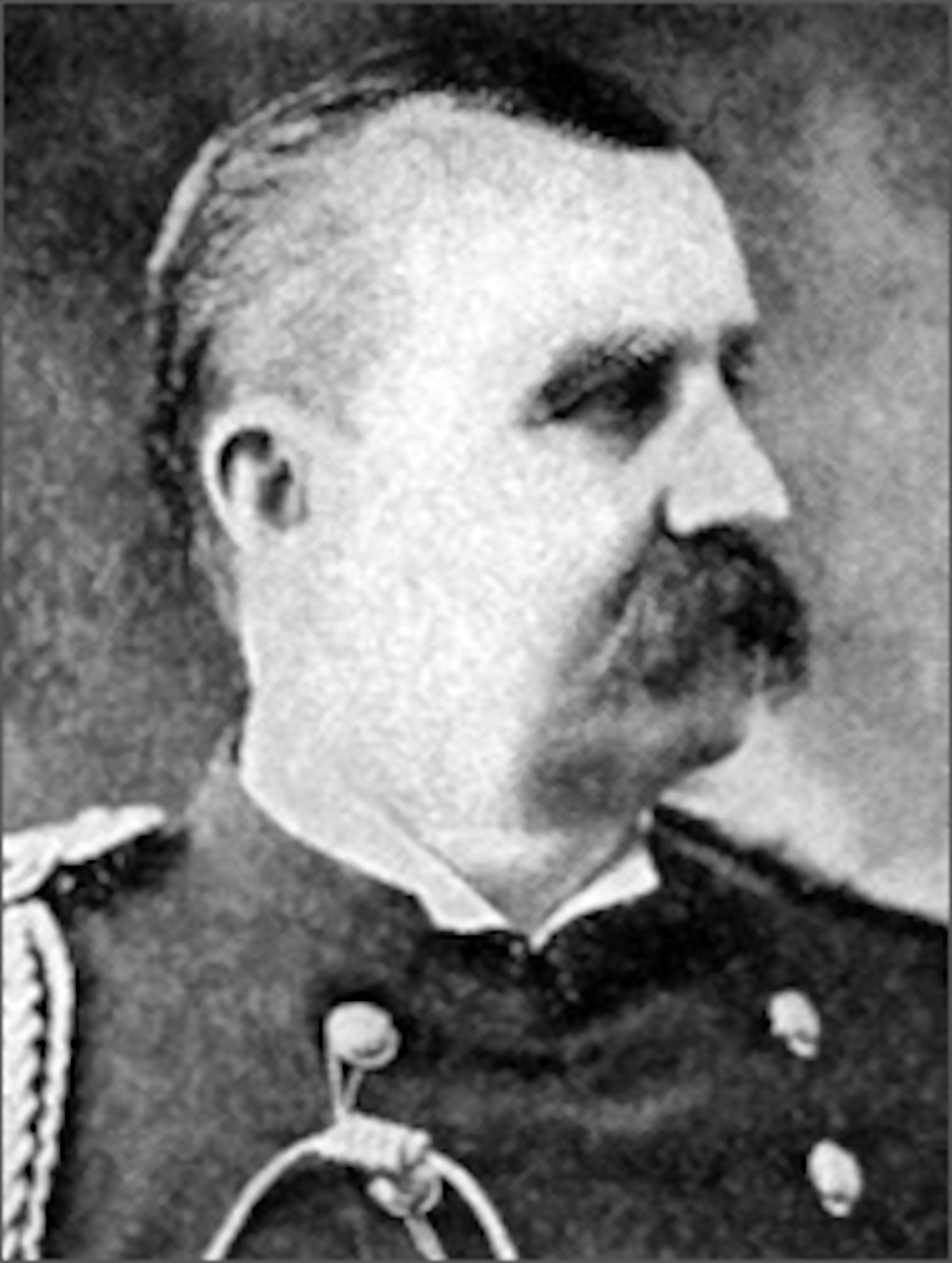
- Cockley in 1889
- Born: June 8, 1843; Lexington, Ohio
- Died: December 26, 1901 (aged 58); Ohio
- Burial place: Shelby-Oakland Cemetery; Shelby, Ohio
- Military career
- Allegiance: United States of America
- Branch: United States Army
- Service years: Battle of Waynesboro
- Rank: First Lieutenant
- Unit: 10th Regiment, Ohio Volunteer Cavalry - Company L,
- Awards: Medal of Honor

First Lieutenant David L. Cockley (June 8, 1843 – December 26, 1901) was an American soldier who fought in the American Civil War. Cockley received the country's highest award for bravery during combat, the Medal of Honor, for his action during the Battle of Waynesboro in Georgia on 4 December 1864. He was honored with the award on 2 August 1897.

== Biography ==
Cockley was born in Lexington, Ohio on 8 June 1843. He enlisted into the 10th Ohio Cavalry. He died on 26 December 1901, and his remains are interred at the Shelby-Oakland Cemetery in Shelby, Ohio.

== Medal of Honor citation ==
While acting as aide-de-camp to a general officer, he 3 times asked permission to join his regiment in a proposed charge upon the enemy, and in response to the last request, having obtained such permission, joined his regiment and fought bravely at its head throughout the action.

== See also ==
- List of American Civil War Medal of Honor recipients: A–F
