= Battle of Waynesboro =

The Battle of Waynesboro is a name given to two different battles during the American Civil War:

- Battle of Waynesboro, Virginia, March 2, 1865
- Battle of Waynesboro, Georgia, December 4, 1864
