= Thomas Davis Ranson =

American lawyer, military officer (1843–1918)

- Born: May 19, 1843; Charles Town, Virginia, United States
- Died: July 21, 1918 (aged 75); Staunton, Virginia, United States
- Burial place: Thornrose Cemetery, Staunton, Virginia, United States
- Education: Washington College, University of Virginia
- Occupation(s): Lawyer, businessperson, military officer
- Spouse(s): Mary Fontaine Alexander (m. 1871–1887; death), Janetta "Janet" Ravenscroft Harrison (m. 1887–1893; death), Margaret Fisher Warren (m. 1900–1918; death)
- Children: 11

Capt. Thomas Davis Ranson (May 19, 1843 – July 21, 1918), was an American lawyer, businessperson, and military officer, from Staunton, Virginia. He was a member of the Confederate States Army, and served in the Stonewall Brigade under General Thomas Jonathan "Stonewall" Jackson during the American Civil War.

== Early life and education ==
Thomas Davis Ranson was born on May 19, 1843 in Homestead House near Charles Town in Virginia (now West Virginia). He was related the prominent Baldwin family of Staunton, Virginia on his maternal side; his maternal descendants immigrated in the 17th century from England. Ranson attended Jacob Fuller’s classical school in Lexington, and Washington College (now Washington and Lee University) in Lexington.

== Military service and career ==
Ranson joined the Confederate States Army in 1861 during the start of the American Civil War, where he initially served as a private during the Harpers Ferry fighting in April of the same year. Ranson had fast promotion in the military ranks. After serving in the battle of First Manassas, he was promoted to sergeant major to the 52nd Virginia Infantry Regiment. He was the aide-de-camp to Gen. Edward Johnson at the Battle of Camp Allegheny.

On May 1, 1862, he attained the rank of lieutenant right before the Shenandoah Valley Campaign led by Thomas "Stonewall" Jackson. He was wounded at the Battle of McDowell on May 8, 1862, and again wounded at the Battle of Cross Keys on June 8, 1862. By the Battle of Antietam on September 17, 1862, Ranson was in better health and had joined the Confederacy States Army's "secret service department as a captain of scouts". In 1863 and 1864, Ranson reported to Gen. Robert E. Lee and Gen. J. E. B. Stuart directly. He joined Gen. J. E. B. Stuart's cavalry at the Battle of Brandy Station on June 9, 1863. He also fought in a battle in Upperville and at the Battle of Jack's Shop. Ranson continued fighting battles until his capture by the Union Army and imprisoned at Fort McHenry.

He was released from the military in July 1865, and tried to return to farming in Charles Town. He left farming to attend law school, Ranson graduated in 1868 from the University of Virginia. After graduation he moved to Staunton, Virginia and practiced law; as well as serving as the director of the Virginia School for the Deaf and the Blind. He also served as a trustee of Washington and Lee University, and of Stuart Hall School. In 1906, he was the vice president of the Tidewater Railway Company.

Ranson was the commander of the Stonewall Jackson Camp of Confederate Veterans, and lieutenant commander of the Grand Camp of Virginia.

He died on July 21, 1918 after experiencing a stroke five days earlier.
