= 10th Ohio Cavalry Regiment =

- Ohio state flag
- Active: October 1862 to July 24, 1865
- Country: United States
- Allegiance: Union
- Branch: Cavalry
- Engagements: Tullahoma Campaign; Chickamauga Campaign; Battle of Chickamauga; Battle of Tunnel Hill; Atlanta campaign Battle of Resaca; Battle of Dallas; Battle of New Hope Church; Battle of Allatoona; Siege of Atlanta; Battle of Lovejoy's Station; Battle of Jonesboro; Sherman's March to the Sea; Battle of Waynesboro, Georgia; Carolinas campaign Battle of Waynesboro, Virginia; Battle of Bentonville

The 10th Ohio Cavalry Regiment was a cavalry regiment that served in the Union Army during the American Civil War.

== Service ==
The 10th Ohio Cavalry Regiment was organized at Camp Taylor in Cleveland, Ohio, in October 1862 and mustered in for a three years under the command of Colonel Charles C. Smith. Companies were mustered in beginning in December 1862 and continuing through July 1863. Companies A and M were mustered in at Camp Chase in Columbus, Ohio.

The regiment was attached to 2nd Brigade, 2nd Cavalry Division, Army of the Cumberland, to August, 1863. 3rd Brigade, 2nd Division, Cavalry Corps, Army of the Cumberland, to November 1863. 2nd Brigade, 2nd Division, Cavalry Corps, Army of the Cumberland, to April 1864. 2nd Brigade, Kilpatrick's 3rd Division, Cavalry Corps, Army of the Cumberland, to October 1864. 2nd Brigade, 3rd Division, Cavalry Corps, Military Division Mississippi, to June 1865. Department of North Carolina to July 1865.

The 10th Ohio Cavalry mustered out of service July 24, 1865, at Lexington, North Carolina.

=== Detailed service ===
The 10th Ohio Volunteer Cavalry's detailed service is as follows:

==== 1863 ====
Left Ohio for Nashville, Tenn., February 27, 1863. Duty at Murfreesboro until June 1863. Expedition to Auburn, Snow Hill, Liberty, etc., April 2–6. Smith's Ford April 2. Snow Hill, Woodbury, April 3. Scout to Smithville June 4–5. Snow Hill June 4. Smithville June 5. Scout on Salem Pike June 12. Tullahoma Campaign June 23-July 7. Occupation of middle Tennessee until August 16. Passage of Cumberland Mountains and Tennessee River and Chickamauga Campaign August 16-September 22. Battle of Chickamauga September 19–21. Operations against Wheeler and Roddy September 30-October 17. McMinnville October 4. Farmington October 7. March to relief of Knoxville November 27-December 8. Near Loudon December 2. Expedition to Murphey, N.C., December 6–11. Near Dandridge December 22–23 (detachment). Dandridge December 24 (detachment). Mossy Creek, Talbot Station, December 29.

==== 1864 ====
Schulz's Mill, Cosby Creek, January 14, 1864 (detachment). Near Wilsonville January 22, 1864. Expedition to Quallatown, N.C., January 31-February 7 (detachment). Quallatown February 5. Scout from Ringgold, Ga., to Lafayette April 24–25. Atlanta Campaign May 1 to September 8. Stone Church May 1. Lee's Cross Roads and Ringgold Gap May 2. Demonstrations on Resaca May 8–13. Sugar Valley May 11. Near Resaca May 13. Battle of Resaca May 14–15. Rome May 17–18. Battles about Dallas, New Hope Church, and Allatoona Hills May 25-June 5. Near Stilesboro June 9 (detachment). Operations about Marietta and against Kennesaw Mountain June 10-July 2. On line of the Chattahoochie River July 3–17. Siege of Atlanta July 22-August 25. Frogtown August 3. Lovejoy's Station August 10. Sandtown and Fairburn August 15. Kilpatrick's Raid around Atlanta July 18–22. Camp Creek August 18. Red Oak and Jonesboro August 19. Lovejoy's Station August 20. Claiborne August 24. Flank movement on Jonesborough August 25–30. Fairburn August 27–28. Red Oak August 28. Flint River Station and Jonesborough August 30. Battle of Jonesboro August 31-September 1. Lovejoy's Station September 2–6. Campbellton September 10. Operations against Hood in northern Georgia and northern Alabama September 30-November 3. Camp Creek September 30. Sweetwater and Noyes Creek near Powder Springs October 2–3. Van Wert October 9–10, Dallas October 21. March to the sea November 10-December 15. Bear Creek Station November 16. Walnut Creek and East Macon November 20. Waynesboro November 27–28. Buckhead Creek or Reynolds' Plantation November 28. Louisville November 30. Waynesboro December 4. Ebenezer Creek December 8. Siege of Savannah December 10–21.

==== 1865 ====
Campaign of the Carolinas January to April 1865. Aiken and Blackville, S.C., February 11. North Edisto River February 12–13. Guenter's Bridge February 14. Phillips' Cross Roads, N.C., March 4. Rockingham March 7–8. Monroe's Cross Roads March 10. Taylor's Hole Creek, Averysboro, March 16. Battle of Bentonville March 19–21. Raleigh April 12–13. Morrisville April 13. Bennett's House April 26. Surrender of Johnston and his army. Duty in the Department of North Carolina until July.

== Casualties ==
The regiment lost a total of 201 men during service; 3 officers and 34 enlisted men killed or mortally wounded, 1 officer and 158 enlisted men died of disease.

== Commanders ==
- Colonel Charles C. Smith - Honorably discharged January 13, 1865
- Colonel Thomas Wakefield Sanderson - Promoted to colonel, January 30, 1865; brevetted brigadier general to date from March 13, 1865; mustered out with regiment, July 24, 1865

== Notable members ==
- 1st Lieutenant David L. Cockley, Company L – Medal of Honor recipient for action at the Battle of Waynesboro, Georgia, December 4, 1864

== See also ==
- List of Ohio Civil War units
- Ohio in the Civil War
