= Battle of Jack's Shop =

1863 American Civil War battle

Coordinates: 38°18.539′N 78°16.409′W

- Part of the Gettysburg campaign of the American Civil War
Date	September 22, 1863
Location	Rochelle, Virginia
Result	Indecisive

Belligerents
United States	(Confederate States of America) Confederate States

Commanders and leaders
John Buford; Hugh Kilpatrick; Thomas Devin	J. E. B. Stuart

The Battle of Jack's Shop was a cavalry engagement fought on September 22, 1863, by Union forces under John Buford and Hugh Kilpatrick and a Confederate division under J. E. B. Stuart during the American Civil War.

== Battle ==
First known as Jack's Shop for a blacksmith shop that stood nearby, Rochelle, in Madison County, Virginia, was the scene of a cavalry skirmish on September 22, 1863. While Confederate cavalry under Major General J. E. B. Stuart engaged Union Brigadier General John Buford's troops, the cavalry of Brigadier General Hugh Judson Kilpatrick rode to Buford's support and attacked the rear of Stuart's force. Stuart's horse artillery and his cavalry fired and charged in both directions. They broke through Kilpatrick's lines and escaped. The engagement was inconclusive.

== Analysis ==
The battle was fought while Lee's forces were withdrawing across the Rapidan River, following the great defeat at Gettysburg. Together with the Battle of James City, which had been fought almost two weeks earlier, on October 8, the Battle of Jack's Shop has been said by Madison County historian Harold Woodward, Jr. to mark the end of the Gettysburg campaign.

== Sources ==
- Combs, Paula (September 22, 2016). "Preserving History at Jack’s Shop and James City". Piedmont Environmental Council. Retrieved May 10, 2023.
- Thomas, Emory M. (1999). Bold Dragoon: The Life of J. E. B. Stuart. Norman, OK: University of Oklahoma Press. pp. 112 (map), 263, 271–273.
