= Battle of Pig Point =

Battle of the American Civil War

Coordinates: 36°55′00″N 76°26′06″W

- Part of the Eastern theater of the American Civil War
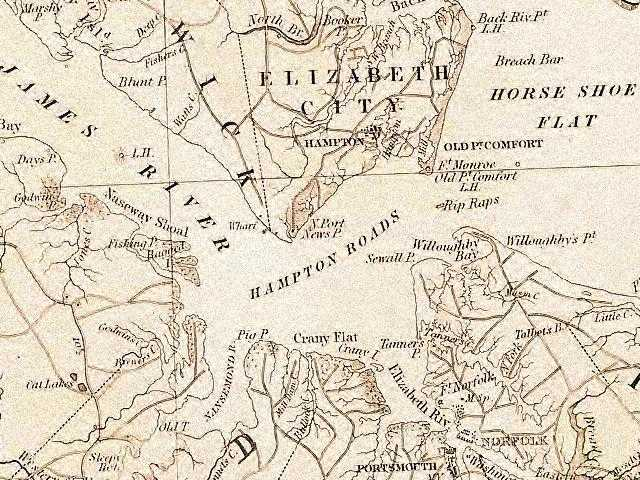
- Map of Hampton Roads, 1859, showing Pig Point
Location	Pig Point, Virginia; Suffolk, Virginia
Result	Confederate victory, inconclusive Union gunboat withdrew

Belligerents
United States (Union)	(Confederate States of America) CSA (Confederacy)

Commanders and leaders
John Faunce	Robert B. Pegram; John C. Owens

Strength
Gunboat crew	Shore battery garrison

Casualties and losses
5 wounded	0

The Battle of Pig Point, Virginia was an engagement between the Union gunboat USRC Harriet Lane and a shore battery and rifle company of the Confederate Army on June 5, 1861 in the third month of the American Civil War. Pig Point is located in Suffolk, Virginia at the mouth of the Nansemond River near Hampton Roads, Virginia. This location is about 5 miles (8.0 km) from Newport News, Virginia. The engagement occurred before any significant battles, other than the opening Battle of Fort Sumter, had taken place and received some notoriety at the time. The action was essentially inconclusive, but the Confederates repulsed the Union gunboat's attack, and the defenders' gunfire wounded five of its crew. Like other early engagements between Union gunboats and Confederate shore batteries, the battle at Pig Point was an early Civil War military action in connection with the blockade by the Union Navy of the Southern States in general and Chesapeake Bay in particular. Correspondingly, it was part of the effort by Confederate forces to deny the use of rivers in Virginia to Union military and commercial traffic.

== Background ==
On April 15, 1861, the day after the small U.S. Army garrison surrendered Fort Sumter in the harbor Charleston, South Carolina to Confederate forces, President Abraham Lincoln called for 75,000 volunteers to reclaim federal property and to suppress the incipient rebellion of the seven Deep South Slave states. Four Upper South States which also permitted slavery, including Virginia, refused to furnish troops for this purpose and began the process of secession from the Union. On April 17, 1861, a convention in Richmond, Virginia passed an ordinance providing for Virginia's secession from the Union and authorized the governor to call for volunteers to join the military forces of Virginia to defend the state against Federal military action. The Virginia Secession Convention made the act of secession subject to a vote of the people of the state on May 23, 1861, but the actions of the convention and Virginia political leaders, especially Governor John Letcher, effectively took Virginia out of the Union. In view of developments to complete secession in Virginia, President Lincoln also did not wait for the vote of the people of Virginia on secession to take action that treated Virginia as part of the Confederacy. On April 27, 1861, he extended the blockade of the original Confederate States that he had declared on April 19, 1861, to include the ports of Virginia and North Carolina.

On May 27, 1861, Major General Benjamin Butler commanding Fort Monroe at the tip of the Virginia Peninsula between the James River and the York River sent forces eight mi (13 km) south to occupy Newport News, Virginia. By May 29, the Union Army established a camp and battery at Newport News Point that could cover the entrance to the James River ship canal and the mouth of the Nansemond River. Meanwhile, the Confederates established a battery at Pig Point across the Nansemond River from Newport News with guns captured from the Gosport Navy Yard in Norfolk County, Virginia, now part of Portsmouth, Virginia. After establishing the Union position at Newport News, Butler wished to move up the Nansemond River to capture Suffolk, Virginia. He had to dispose of the battery at Pig Point to accomplish this objective.

== Battle ==
General Butler ordered Captain John Faunce to take the Harriet Lane, one of the boats which had tried to reinforce and resupply Fort Sumter, and attack the Confederate battery at Pig Point on June 5, 1861, in order to ascertain its strength. Faunce attacked the battery but due to shallow water, he had to fire his 30 shots from too great a distance. Most fell short of the Confederate position. The Confederate defenders, including the Portsmouth Rifle Company returned fire and wounded five of the Union steamer's crew. From this brief engagement, Faunce determined that the battery was strong and considered his mission complete. He withdrew the Harriett Lane from the engagement in the face of the superior Confederate firepower.

Captain Robert Pegram commanding the Confederate battery reported that the Harriet Lane fired 33 shots and inflicted no casualties or damage. The Confederates returned fire with 23 shots. A later account stated that the Harriet Lane had disabled a 48-pound cannon at the battery. Five of the Harriet Lane's crew were wounded by the Confederate gunfire.

On the same date, June 5, 1861, the USS Quaker City captured the Confederate ship General Greene off the nearby Virginia Capes.

== Aftermath ==
The Confederates maintained control of Pig Point and operation of the battery until they abandoned Norfolk and Portsmouth, Virginia at the start of the Peninsula Campaign on March 9, 1862. Union forces occupied Norfolk and Portsmouth on May 10 and 11, 1862.
