= Pig Point =

Pig Point (54°4′S 37°9′W) is a point which forms the south side of the entrance to North Bay, Prince Olav Harbor, on the north coast of South Georgia. Probably named by DI personnel who charted Prince Olav Harbor in 1929.
