= Battle of Broxton Bridge =

Battle of the American Civil War

- Part of American Civil War
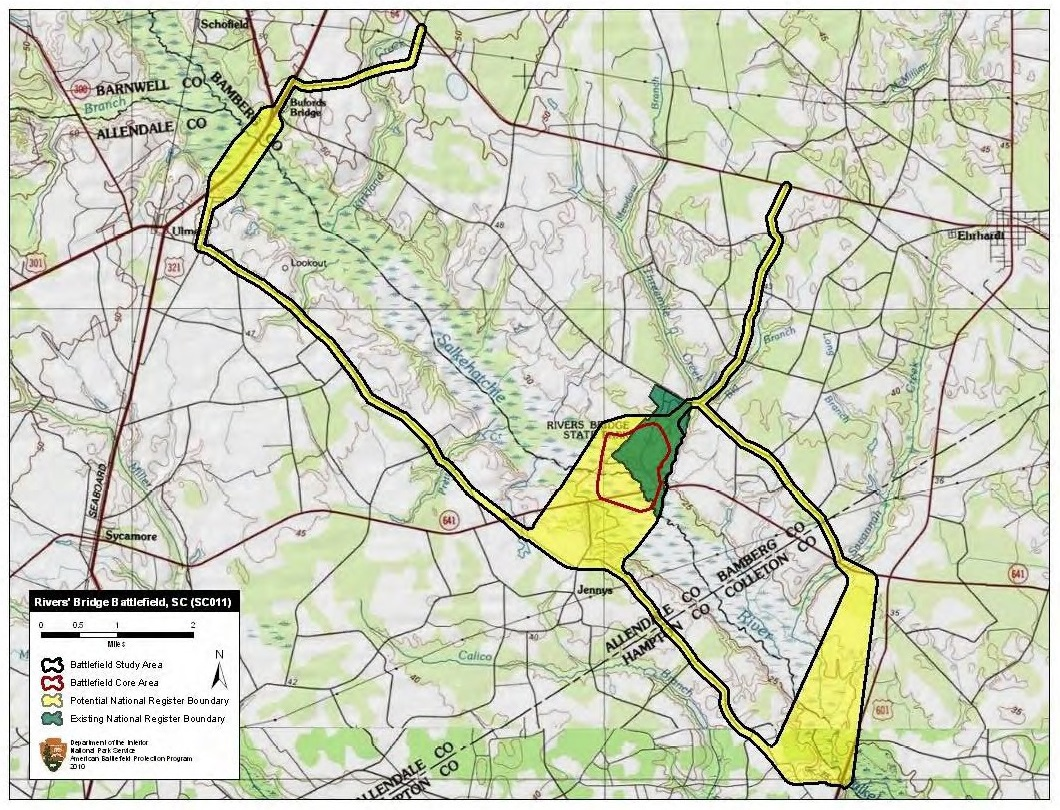
- Overview of the Battlefield
| Date | February 2, 1865 |
| Location | Salkehatchie River, Bamberg County, South Carolina 33°3′10″N 81°5′59″W |
| Result | Union victory |

Belligerents
| United States | CSA |

Commanders and leaders
| (United States) Maj. Gen. Francis Preston Blair Jr. (United States) Maj. Gen. Joseph A. Mower | (Confederate States of America) Maj. Gen. Lafayette McLaws (Confederate States of America) Brig. Gen. Marcellus Augustus Stovall (Confederate States of America) Col. George P. Harrison Jr. |

Units involved
| XVII Corps | Harrison's Brigade; 3rd Arkansas Cavalry; Earle's (South Carolina) Battery; McLaw's Division |

Strength
| 7,000 men | 1,200 men |

Casualties and losses
| 16 killed 85 wounded | 8 killed 45 wounded 44 captured |
- Location within South Carolina

The Battle of Broxton Bridge took place during the American Civil War on February 2, 1865, and coincided with the Battle of Rivers' Bridge along the Salkehatchie River in Bamberg County, South Carolina. The battle concluded in a Union victory and resulted in the destruction of the last Confederate defensive line before the Union Army went on to Capture Columbia and burn it later that month.

== Pre-Battle Situation ==
The Union Army took part in the Carolinas campaign by departing Savannah, Georgia for Columbia, South Carolina on February 1, 1865. The Confederate Army attempted to halt the Union Army's advance by setting up several defensive positions along the Salkehatchie River such as Rivers’ Bridge, Buford's Bridge, and Broxton's Bridge.

== The Battle ==
When the Union Army under the command of Major general William Tecumseh Sherman reached the Confederate defenses on February 2, Sherman decided to send his left wing, consisting of the Army's First Division under the command of Major General Joseph A. Mower, to march on Broxton Bridge while the rest of the XVII Corps would attempt to capture Rivers' Bridge which lay upstream. The Salkehatchie River was the final defense line before the Union Army could march on Columbia, so the capture of at least one crossing proved crucial if the campaign was to succeed.

The first skirmish of the battle occurred between a Union infantry battalion of the First Division and the Confederate Cavalry, in which the Union forces proved victorious as the Confederate Cavalry retreated behind the Broxton Bridge. Seeing this retreat Major General Mower ordered an attack on Broxton Bridge, but was repelled by the Confederates. Following this loss, Mower ordered his troops to instead march six miles upstream to assist his comrades in the Battle of Rivers' Bridge. As a full frontal charge was deemed impossible due to the Confederates strongly entrenched positions, an attack was delayed until the next day when the Union forces crossed the Rivers' Bridge by plowing through a nearby swamp. At the same time a small Union force had returned to Broxton Bridge to engage the enemy again in a flanking maneuver. This time the attack proved successful, and as a result forced the Confederate Army to abandon their positions and retreat toward Columbia.

== Aftermath ==
The Union victories at Broxton Bridge and Rivers' Bridge led to the occupation of the countryside North of the Salkehatchie River by the Union Army, as well as the ability to cut off the South Carolina Railroad, an important supply line, from the Confederate defenders. The defeat of the Confederate Army at Salkehatchie River also ultimately led to the Capture of Columbia later that month. The Union casualties were recovered shortly after the battle and were buried in the National Cemetery at Beaufort, South Carolina.

Currently, the Broxton Bridge location still bears the scars of the battle that took place in 1865. Some breastworks are still well preserved as well as remnants of the Confederate defense lines. A re-enactment of the battle takes place yearly near the old battlefield.
