= Battle of James City =

1863 battle of the American Civil War

- Part of the Bristoe campaign of the American Civil War
Date	October 10, 1863
Location	Madison County, Virginia 38°26′16.0″N 78°08′16.9″W
Result	Confederate victory

Belligerents
United States (Union)	(Confederate States of America) Confederate States

Commanders and leaders
(United States) Judson Kilpatrick	(Confederate States of America) J. E. B. Stuart

Casualties and losses
114 (Note: Official Records, sec. 1, vol. 29, pt. 1 p.329, while Dyer's Compendium, gives 50. Kilpatrick did not give a separate number for the cavlary)	unknown

The Battle of James City was fought on October 10, 1863, and was the opening engagement of the Bristoe campaign during the American Civil War. Commanding the Union forces was Gen. Judson Kilpatrick, while J.E.B. Stuart led the Confederate forces.

== Background ==
In August 1863, after the retreat at the Battle of Gettysburg, the Army of Northern Virginia under Robert E. Lee withdrew across the Rapidan River. Lee sent his First Corps under Gen. Longstreet south to Tennessee. Longstreet's timely arrival helped Confederate forces achieve a victory at the Battle of Chickamauga. After the Confederate victory at Chickamauga, Gen. Halleck ordered Gen. Meade to transfer the Union XI and XII Corps to Washington, D.C. They would eventually be transported by rail to Tennessee. In the fall of 1863, Lee knew that with Meade's army reduced by two corps, now would be the time to move. He sent Stuart to screen his army and attack the Union signal station to capture the Federal signal station atop Thoroughfare Mountain.

== Battle ==
At 3:00 a.m. on October 10, 1863, Stuart's forces moved across the Robinson River (Virginia). The primary Confederate attack happened around 6:30 a.m. when James B. Gordon's brigade attacked the 5th New York Cavalry Regiment at Russell's Ford. The Confederate cavalry pushed the 5th New York back to Bethesaida Church. Already stationed at the church was the 120th New York Infantry Regiment. Stuart commanded his men to attack the New Yorkers and sent Pierce M. B. Young's men to attack their flank. The fight at the church happened fast. The 120th New York held off Stuart's men for an hour, but eventually collapsed, and the men ran, having suffered heavy casualties. Stuart's cavalry continued towards James City. Kilpatrick's main force was stationed there. Kirkpatrick realized he was facing a large number of Stuart's forces. He called on Henry Prince's infantry for support, but Prince did not move. Stuart moved up his artillery and traded fire with the Union gunners. Prince's men eventually moved forward. In the afternoon, around 4 p.m., Custer charged with the 5th Michigan Cavalry but took a volley from the 1st South Carolina cavalry. Stuart's men held. Custer eventually retreated. In the morning of the 11th, Stuart realized that Kikpatrick and the Union infantry had withdrawn from his front. As darkness fell, Stuart screened Ewell's Corps as it moved northward.

== Aftermath ==
By the evening of October 10th, A. P. Hill's and Ewell's Corps had crossed the Robinson River. But news of Lee's advance had reached Meade in part from reports from deserters. On the morning of the 11th, Meade abandoned Culpeper and moved his forces northward since Lee was moving his forces towards Meade's right and rear. These movements set up the First Battle of Auburn two days later.
