= Battle of Waynesboro, Georgia =

1864 battle of the American Civil War

Coordinates: 33.08972°N 82.01583°W

Battle of Waynesboro
- Part of the American Civil War
| Date | December 4, 1864 |
| Location | Waynesboro, Georgia |
| Result | Union victory |

Belligerents
| United States (Union) | Confederate States |

Commanders and leaders
| (United States) Judson Kilpatrick | (Confederate States of America) Joseph Wheeler |

Strength
| 6,000 | 4,000 |

Casualties and losses
| 190 | 250 |

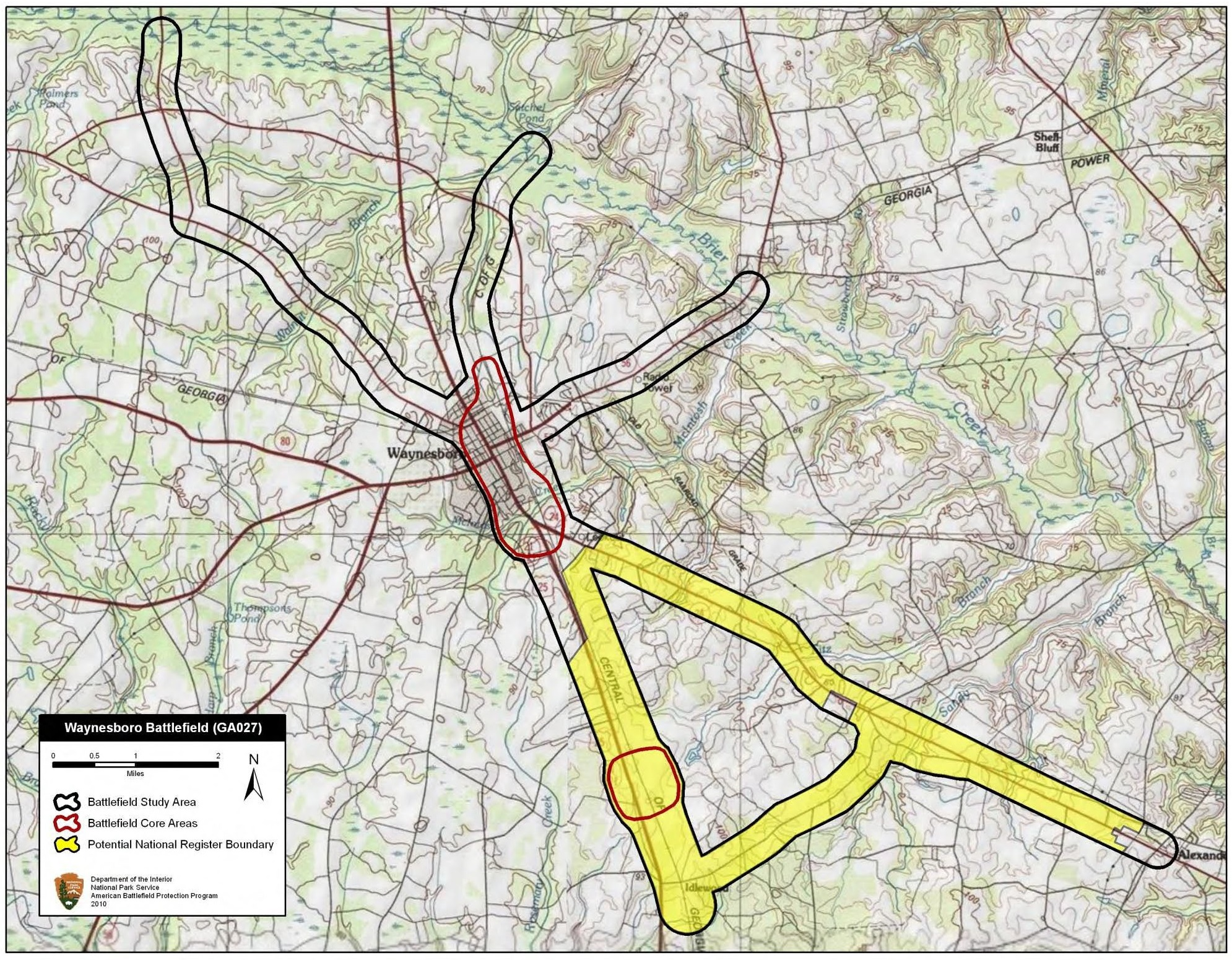
Map of Waynesboro Battlefield core and study areas by the American Battlefield Protection Program.

The Battle of Waynesboro was an American Civil War battle fought on December 4, 1864, in eastern Georgia, towards the end of Sherman's March to the Sea. Union cavalry forces under Brig. Gen. Judson Kilpatrick defeated Confederate cavalry led by Maj. Gen. Joseph Wheeler, opening the way for William T. Sherman's armies to approach their objective, Savannah.

As Sherman's infantry marched southeast through Georgia, his cavalry under Judson Kilpatrick rode northeastward. In the late afternoon of November 26, 1864, elements of Kilpatrick's 3rd Cavalry Division had reached the wooden railroad bridge north of Waynesboro, Georgia, and partially burned it before being driven off by troops dispatched from the Cavalry Corps of the Army of Tennessee by Joseph Wheeler. After the numerically inferior Confederates withdrew, Kilpatrick entered Waynesboro the next day and destroyed a train of cars and much private property before being driven from the town by Wheeler. At dawn on November 28, Wheeler suddenly attacked Kilpatrick's camp south of Waynesboro and drove him southwest beyond Buckhead Creek toward Louisville.

Annoyed by Wheeler's constant harassment, Kilpatrick set out on the morning of December 4 with his full division to attack Waynesboro and finally destroy Wheeler's small command. Early in the morning, Kilpatrick, now supported by two infantry brigades dispatched from Baird's division of the XIV Corps, advanced from Thomas's Station six miles northward to burn the bridges over Brier Creek north and east of Waynesboro.

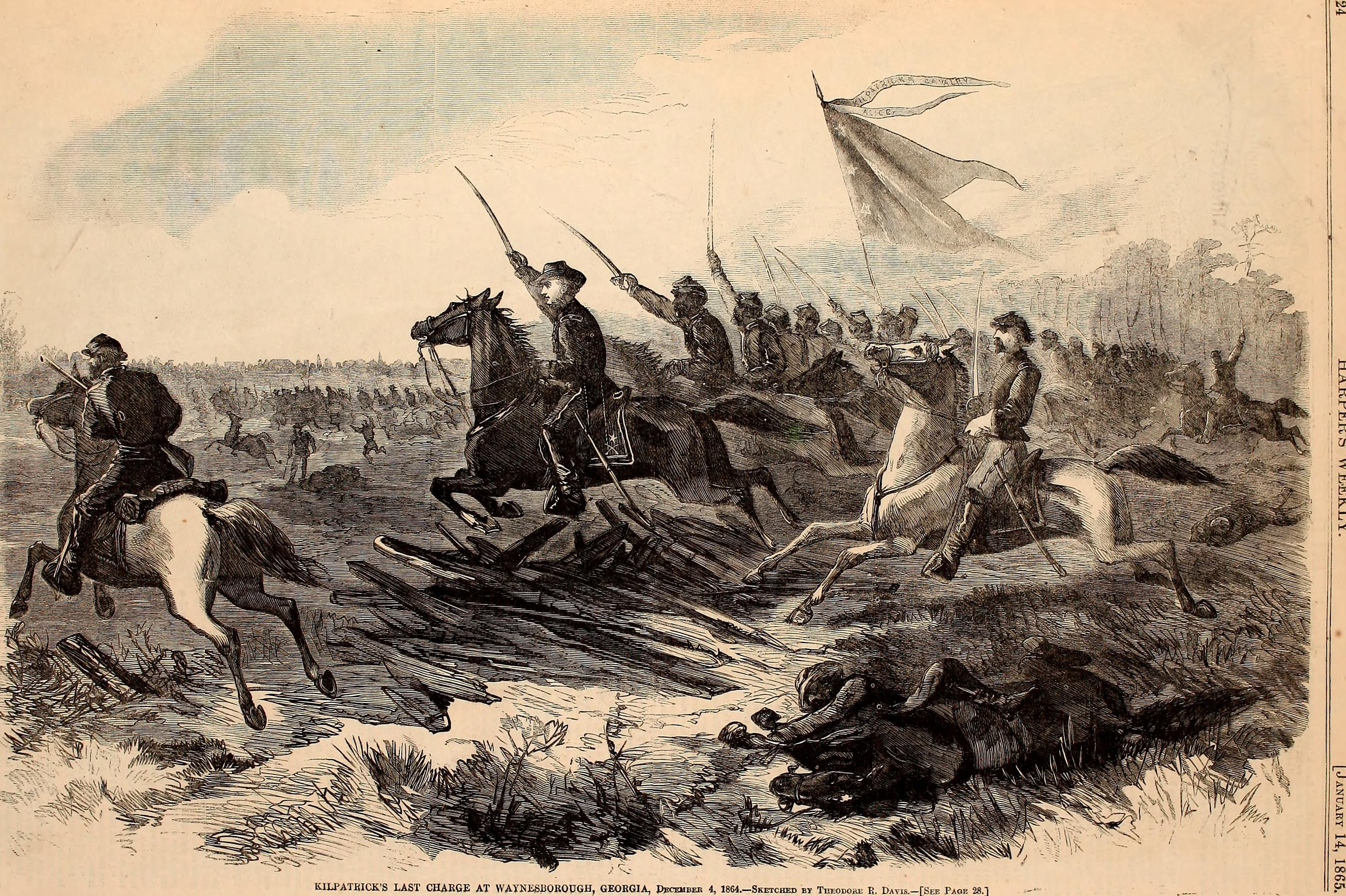
Kilpatrick's last charge at Waynesborough

Finding Wheeler's Confederates deployed astride the road, Kilpatrick attacked, driving the Confederate skirmishers in front of them. The Union force then came up against a strong defensive line of barricades, which they eventually overran. As the Union advance continued, they encountered even more barricades that required additional time to overcome. After hard fighting, Wheeler's outnumbered force retired into Waynesboro and another line of barricades hastily erected in the town's streets. There, Wheeler ordered a charge by Texas and Tennessee troops in order to gain time to withdraw across Brier Creek and block the road to Augusta, which, at the time, appeared to be the objective of General Sherman's army. After furious fighting, the Union troops broke through and Wheeler’s force hastily withdrew.

Finally reaching his objective of Brier Creek, Kilpatrick burned the rail and wagon bridges and withdrew. The supporting infantry brigades marched toward Jacksonboro and rejoined the rest of Baird's division, encamped at Alexander. They were followed that evening by Kilpatrick's command, which camped at Old Church on the old Quaker Road. Additional fighting over the next few days enabled Sherman to close in on Savannah.
