= List of battles fought in Missouri =

This is an incomplete list of all military confrontations that have occurred within the boundaries of the modern U.S. state of Missouri since European contact.

Name	Date	Location	War	Strength	Casualties	Belligerents	Victor	Ref.
St. Louis	May 25, 1780	St. Louis	American Revolutionary War	Spain: 320, Great Britain: ~1,500	108	Spain vs. Great Britain & Indian tribes	Spanish victory	
Sink Hole	May 24, 1815	Lincoln County	War of 1812	Unknown	8	Sauk vs. United States	United States victory	
Battle Creek	July 1829	Schuyler County	American Indian Wars	Unknown	Unknown	Iowa vs. American settlers	United States victory	
Gallatin	August 6, 1838	Gallatin	Missouri Mormon War	Mormon: Unknown, Missouri citizens: 200	Unknown	Latter-Day Saints vs. Missouri citizens	Citizens victory	
Crooked River	October 28, 1838	Crooked River	Missouri Mormon War	Mormon: Unknown, Missouri State Militia: 1 division	4	Latter-Day Saints vs. Missouri State Militia	Latter-Day Saints victory	
Haun's Mill	October 30, 1838	Caldwell County	Missouri Mormon War	Mormon: Unknown, Missouri State Militia: 240	21	Latter-Day Saints vs. Missouri State Militia	Missouri victory	
1st Boonville	June 17, 1861	Boonville	American Civil War	Union: 1,700, Missouri State Guard: ~1,500	10 KIA, 17 WIA, 80 POW	United States vs. Missouri (Confederate)	Union victory	
Cole Camp	June 19, 1861	Benton County	American Civil War	Benton County Home Guard: 600, Missouri State Guard: 300	43 KIA, 85 WIA, 25 POW	United States vs. Missouri (Confederate)	Confederate victory	
Carthage	July 5, 1861	Near Carthage	American Civil War	Union: 1,100, Missouri State Guard: 6,000	244	United States vs. Missouri (Confederate)	Confederate victory	
Dug Springs	August 2, 1861	Near Clever	American Civil War	Unknown	48 KIA, 74 WIA	United States vs. Missouri (Confederate)	Union victory	
Athens	August 5, 1861	Clark County	American Civil War	Home Guard: 333-500, Missouri State Guard: ~2,000 men plus 3 cannon	3 KIA, 20 WIA, 31 KIA & WIA	United States vs. Missouri (Confederate)	Union victory	
Wilson's Creek	August 10, 1861	Christian and Greene counties	American Civil War	Union: 5,430, Missouri State Guard: 12,120	535 KIA, 1808 WIA, 196 MIA	United States vs. Missouri (Confederate)	Confederate victory	
Charleston	August 19, 1861	Charleston	American Civil War	Union: 250, Confederate: 500	Unknown	United States vs. Confederate States	Union victory	
Dry Wood Creek	September 2, 1861	Vernon County	American Civil War	Union: 600, Missouri State Guard: Unknown	18 KIA, 16 WIA	United States vs. Missouri (Confederate)	Confederate victory	
2nd Boonville	September 13, 1861	Boonville	American Civil War	Boonville Home Guardsmen: 140, Missouri State Guard: 800		United States vs. Missouri (Confederate)	Union victory	
1st Lexington	September 13–20, 1861	Lexington	American Civil War	Lexington Garrison: 3,500 Missouri State Guard: 15,000	800 KIA, 1,000 POW	United States vs. Missouri (Confederate)	Confederate victory	
Blue Mills Landing	September 17, 1861	Clay County	American Civil War	Union: 600, Missouri State Guard: 3,500	126	United States vs. Missouri (Confederate)	Confederate victory	
Fredericktown	October 21, 1861	Madison County	American Civil War	Union: 2,500, Confederacy: ?	25 KIA, 40 WIA, 80 POW	United States vs. Confederate States	Union victory	
1st Springfield	October 25, 1861	Springfield	American Civil War	Union: 326 Confederacy: 1,500	218	United States vs. Confederate States	Union victory	
Belmont	November 7, 1861	Mississippi County	American Civil War	Union: 3,114, Confederacy: ~5,000	225 KIA, 727 WIA, 221 POW/MIA	United States vs. Confederate States	Indecisive	
Blackwater Creek	December 19, 1861	Johnson County	American Civil War	Union: 4,000, Confederacy: 750	694	United States vs. Confederate States	Union victory	
Mount Zion Church	December 28, 1861	Boone County	American Civil War	Union: 440, Confederacy: ~900	27 KIA, 213 WIA, 64 POW	United States vs. Confederate States	Union victory	
Roan's Tan Yard	January 8, 1862	Randolph County	American Civil War	Union: 450, Confederacy: 800	46 KIA, 99 WIA, 28 POW	United States vs. Confederate States	Union victory	
New Madrid	February 28, 1862 – April 8, 1862	New Madrid	American Civil War	Union: 6 gunboats 11 mortar rafts, Confederacy: ~7,000	53 KIA, 50 WIA, 5 MIA, 7,000 POW	United States vs. Confederate States	Union victory	
Moore's Mill	July 28, 1862	Callaway County	American Civil War	Union: 733, Confederacy: 260–350	13 KIA, 55 WIA, 202 KIA/WIA	United States vs. Confederate States	Union victory	
Cravensville	August 5, 1862	Daviess County	American Civil War	Union: 35, Confederacy: 85	Union 5 wounded Confederates 8 killed 10 wounded	United States vs. Confederate States	Union victory	
Kirksville	August 6, 1862	Adair County	American Civil War	Union: 1,000, Confederacy: 2,500	456	United States vs. Confederate States	Union victory	
Compton's Ferry	August 11, 1862	Livingston County	American Civil War	Union: Unknown, Confederacy: ~1,500	Unknown	United States vs. Confederate States	Union victory	
Independence	August 11, 1862	Independence	American Civil War	Union: 344, Confederacy: ~800	344	United States vs. Confederate States	Confederate victory	
Yellow Creek	August 13, 1862	Chariton County	American Civil War	Union: ~700, Confederacy: Unknown	2 WIA, Confederate-?	United States vs. Confederate States	Union victory	
Lone Jack	August 15–16, 1862	Jackson County	American Civil War	Union: 800, Confederacy: 1,500–3,000	270	United States vs. Confederate States	Confederate victory	
1st Newtonia	September 30, 1862	Newtonia	American Civil War	Union: 1,500 Confederacy: 1 brigade	345	United States vs. Confederate States	Confederate victory	
Island Mound	October 29, 1862	Bates County	American Civil War	Union: 250, Confederacy: 350	19	United States vs. Confederate States	Union victory	
Clark's Mill	November 7, 1862	Douglas County	American Civil War	Union: 113, Confederacy: 1,000	113	United States vs. Confederate States	Confederate victory	
2nd Springfield	January 8, 1863	Springfield	American Civil War	Union: 2,099, Confederacy: 1,870	521	United States vs. Confederate States	Union victory	
Hartville	January 9–11, 1863	Wright County	American Civil War	Union: 750, Confederacy: Unknown	19 KIA, 160 WIA, 10 MIA/POW	United States vs. Confederate States	Indecisive	
Cape Girardeau	April 26, 1863	Cape Girardeau County	American Civil War	Union: 4,000, Confederacy: 5,000	337	United States vs. Confederate States	Union victory	
Chalk Bluff	May 1–2, 1863	Dunklin County	American Civil War	Union: 120, Confederacy: 210	53 KIA, 104 WIA, 120 MIA, 53 POW	United States vs. Confederate States	Confederate pyrrhic victory	
3rd Boonville	October 11, 1863	Boonville	American Civil War	Unknown	Unknown	United States vs. Confederate States	Union victory	
Camden Point	July 13, 1864	Camden Point	American Civil War	Union: 1,000, Confederacy: 300	6 KIA, 25 WIA	United States vs. Confederate States	Union victory	
Fort Davidson	September 27, 1864	Iron County	American Civil War	Union: 1,500, Confederacy: 12,000	1,684	United States vs. Confederate States	Union victory	
4th Boonville	October 11, 1864	Boonville	American Civil War	Unknown	Unknown	United States vs. Missouri (Confederate)	Confederate victory	
Glasgow	October 15, 1864	Glasgow	American Civil War	Union: 800, Confederacy: 1,800	450	United States vs. Confederate States	Confederate victory	
Sedalia	October 15, 1864	Sedalia	American Civil War	Union: ~800, Confederacy: ~1,200	1	United States vs. Confederate States	Confederate victory	
2nd Lexington	October 19, 1864	Lexington	American Civil War	Union: 2,000 Confederacy: 8,500	Unknown	United States vs. Confederate States	Confederate victory	
Little Blue	October 21, 1864	Jackson County	American Civil War	Union: 2,000 Confederacy: 8,500	Unknown	United States vs. Confederate States	Confederate victory	
Independence	October 21–22, 1864	Independence	American Civil War	Union: 22,000, Confederacy: 8,500	140	United States vs. Confederate States	Confederate victory	
Big Blue	October 22–23, 1864	Kansas City	American Civil War	Union: 2 divisions, Confederacy: 2 divisions	Unknown	United States vs. Confederate States	Union victory	
Westport	October 23, 1864	Westport	American Civil War	Union: 22,000, Confederacy: 8,500	3,000	United States vs. Confederate States	Union victory	
Charlot	October 25, 1864	Vernon County	American Civil War	Union: 2 brigades, Confederacy: 1 division	Unknown	United States vs. Confederate States	Union victory	
2nd Newtonia	October 28, 1864	Newtonia	American Civil War	Unknown	650	United States vs. Confederate States	Union victory	

== Gallery ==
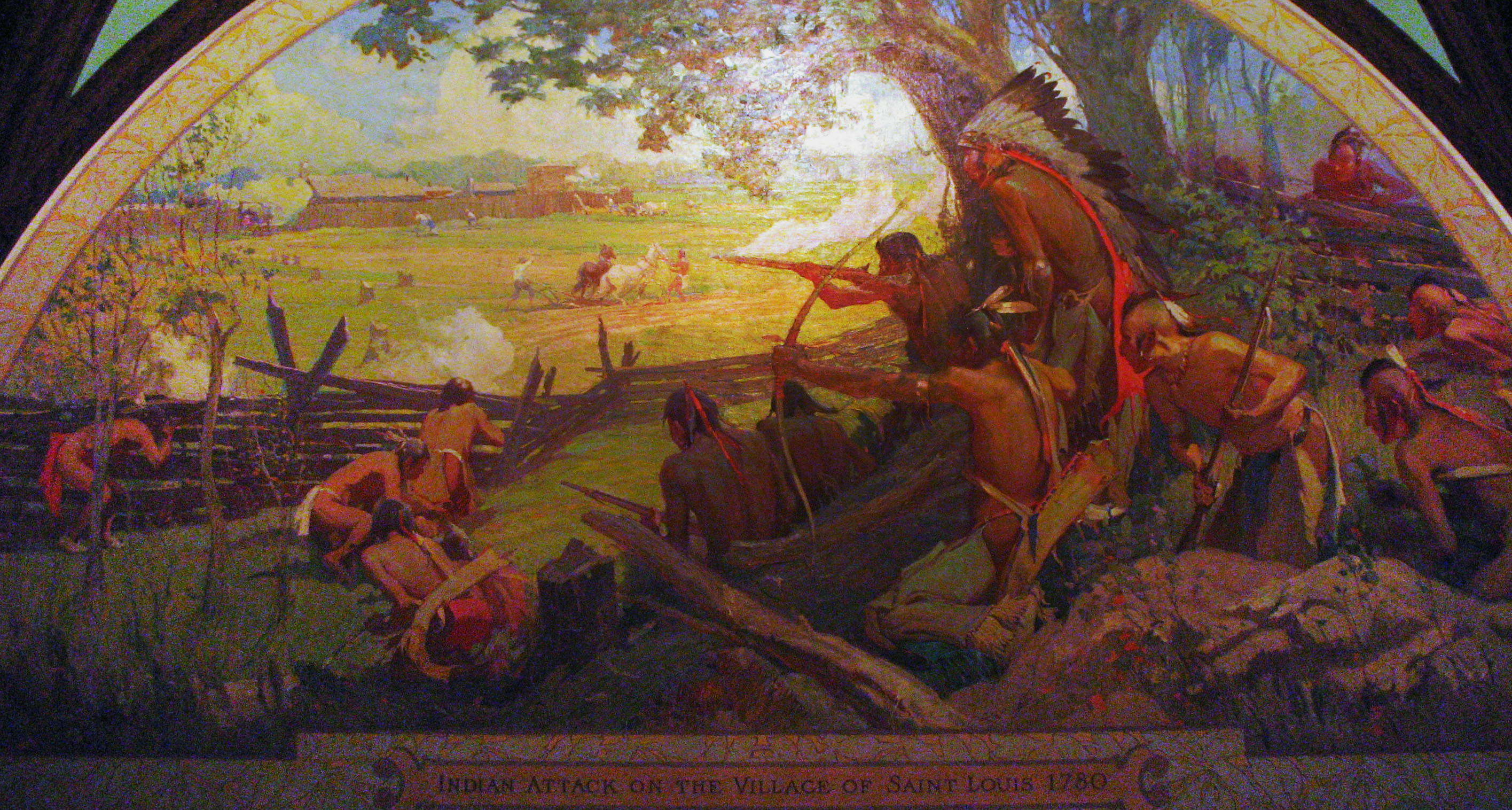
St. Louis (1780)

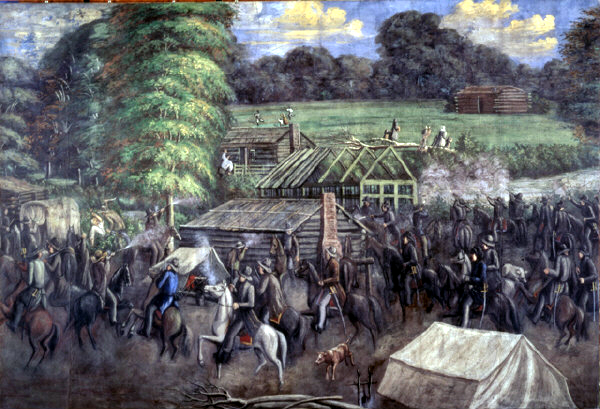
Haun's Mill (1838)

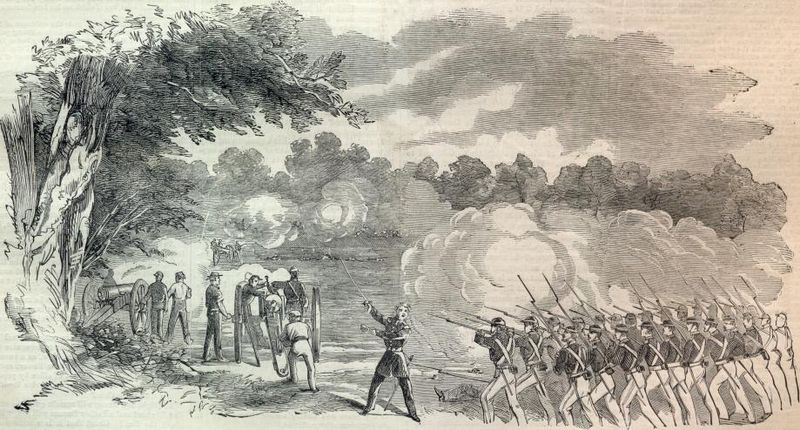
Boonville (1861)

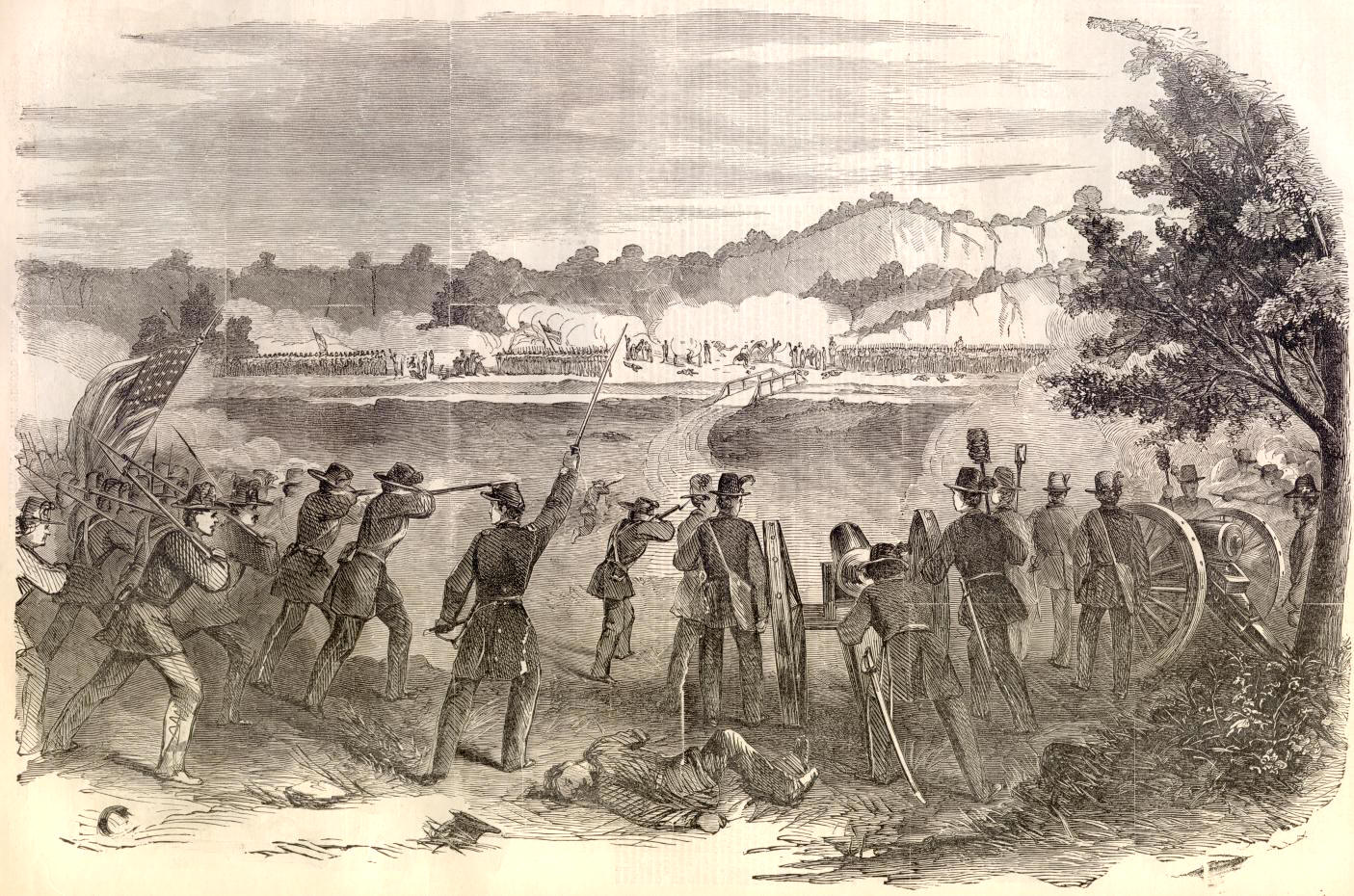
Carthage (1861)

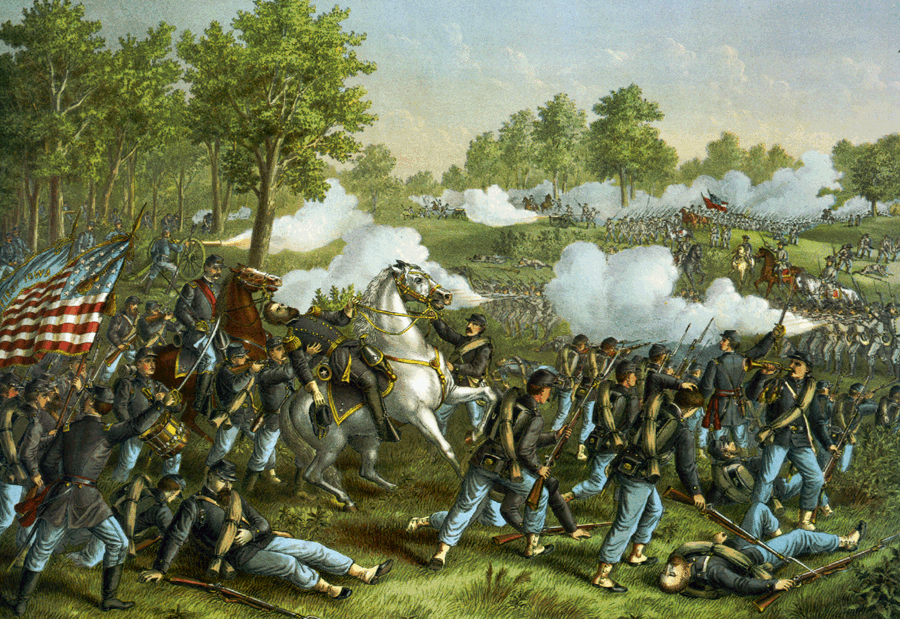
Wilson's Creek (1861)

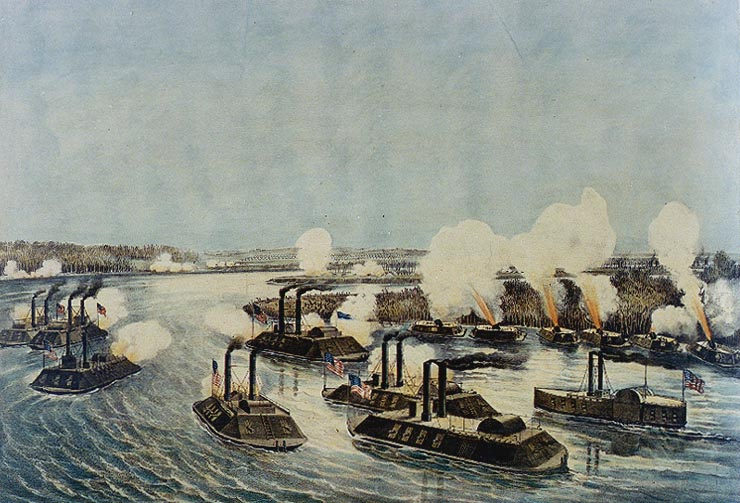
New Madrid (1862)

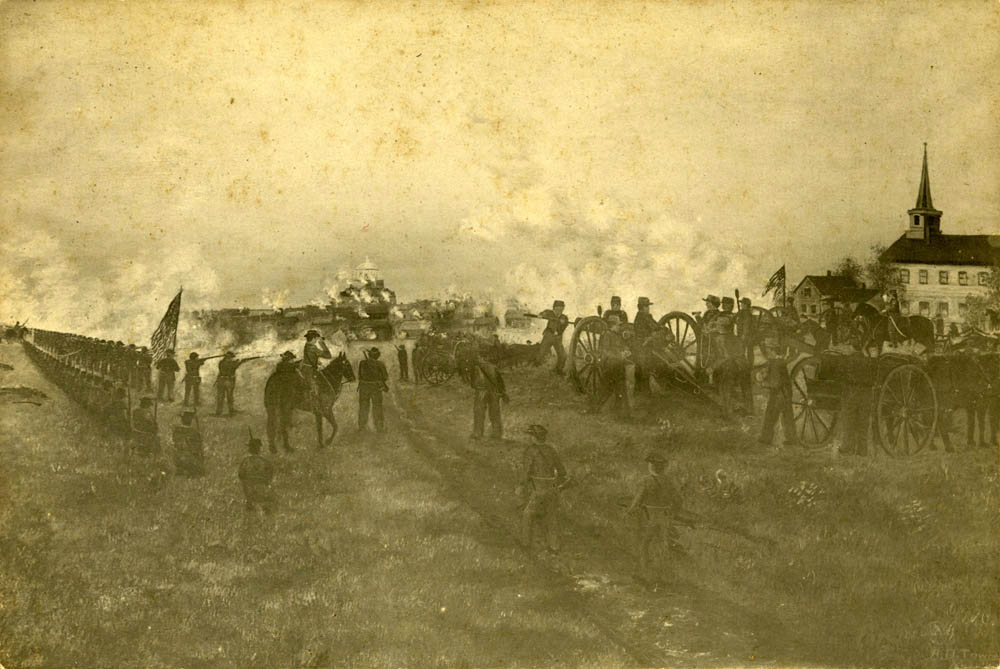
Kirksville (1862)

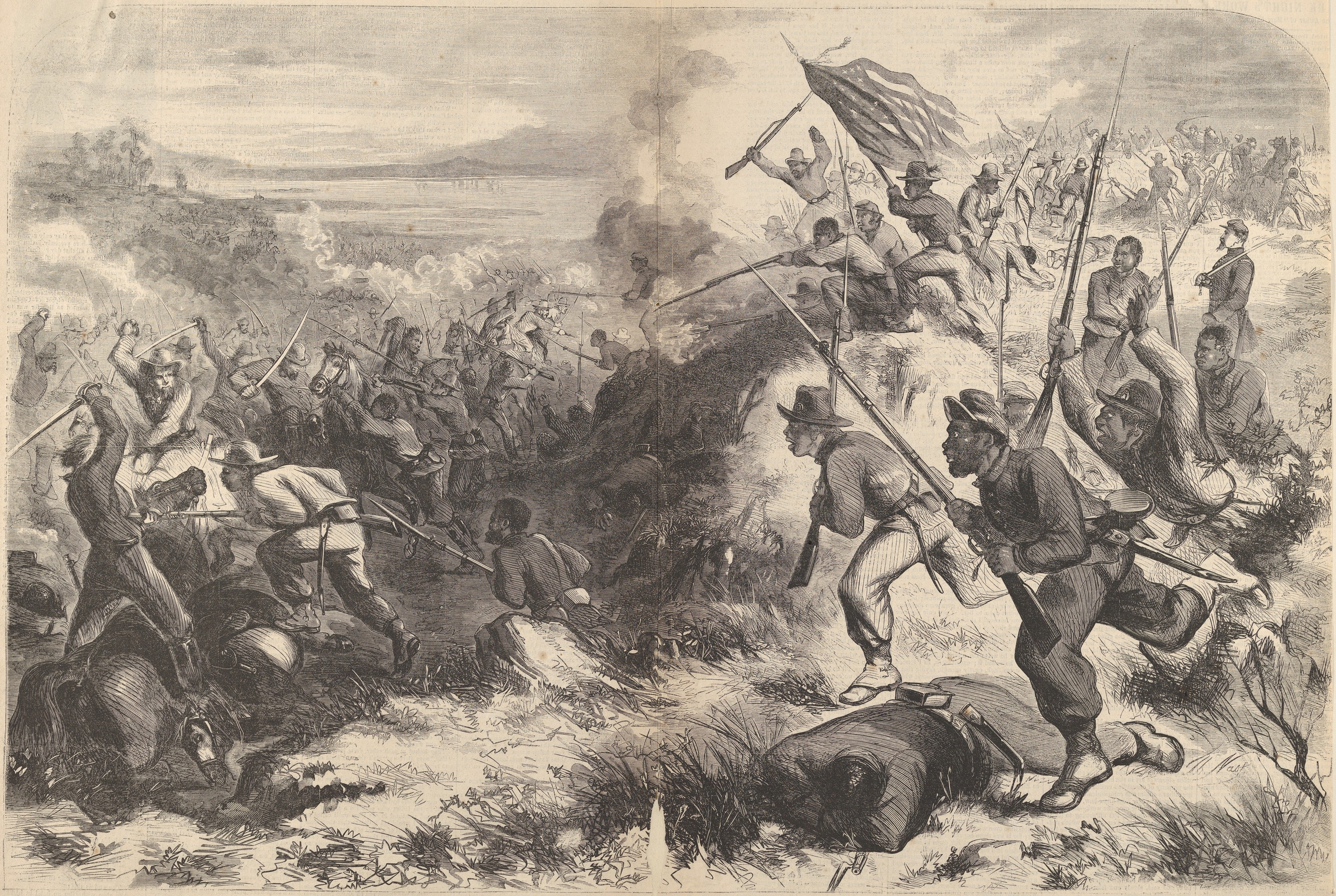
Island Mound (1862)
