= 2nd Missouri Cavalry Regiment =

2nd Missouri Cavalry Regiment Merrill's Horse
- Active: December 1861 to September, 1865
- Country: United States
- Allegiance: Union
- Branch: Cavalry
- Engagements: Battle of Blackwater; Battle of Roan's Tan Yard; Battle of Memphis, MO; Battle of Moore's Mill; Battle of Kirksville; Battle of Chariton River; Battle of Compton's Ferry; Battle of Yellow Creek (1862); Battle of Bayou Fourche; Occupation of Little Rock; Battle of Prairie D'Ane; Camden Expedition; Battle of Jenkins' Ferry; Battle of Little Blue River; Battle of the Big Blue; Battle of Westport; Battle of Marais des Cygnes; Battle of Mine Creek; Battle of Marmiton River; Grierson's Expedition

Commanders
- Notable commanders: Col. Lewis Merrill

The 2nd Missouri Cavalry Regiment, also known officially as Merrill's Horse, was a cavalry regiment that served in the Union Army during the American Civil War. The regiment was one of only a handful of Missouri regiments to be officially named as well as numbered.

The regiment was raised under the authority of Major General John C. Frémont, commander of the Western Department of the U.S. Army, headquartered at St. Louis, Missouri. The regiment was organized by Captain Lewis Merrill, a regular Army officer and a veteran of the prewar U.S. 2nd Dragoons. Serving as a colonel of volunteers, Merrill organized companies of volunteers from Missouri and other western states at St. Louis's Benton Barracks. Merrill enforced a level of discipline unusual for volunteer regiments, demanding a level of professionalism comparable to U.S. Regulars.

To distinguish the troops of his regiment, Merrill mandated a unique uniform. The front of the tunic featured a "horse-head" panel trimmed in cavalry yellow. The mandated cap was similarly unique: a sky-blue forage cap, with an orange welt (the branch color of pre-war Dragoon regiments) in honor of Merrill's service in the 2nd Dragoons. As with other areas of military discipline, Merrill allowed no deviation from his orders to his troopers in concerning their military appearance: "all additions to or alterations of this uniform as prescribed are positively prohibited and will not be tolerated under any circumstances."

Through most of 1862, Merrill's Horse was assigned the difficult mission of fighting guerrillas and irregular Confederate cavalry in north Missouri. Often operating with Federal Missouri State Militia cavalry, the regiment established a reputation of extreme aggressiveness and effectiveness in the counter-guerrilla mission. Later in the war Merrill's Horse would provide distinguished service in more conventional cavalry missions against regular Confederate units. However, in Arkansas, Tennessee, Georgia, and Alabama the regiment was repeatedly called on to return to the difficult specialist counterinsurgency mission of guerrilla fighting.

The regiment is unusual in that it has two official designation. It was officially raised as "Merrill's Horse", and is usually referred to by that designation in period U.S. Army Records. However, after General Fremont was replaced as commander of the Western Department by Major General Henry Halleck received a second official designation at the 2nd Missouri Volunteer Cavalry. However, in almost all contemporary reports and records the regiment continued to be referred to as Merrill's Horse.

== Service ==
Organized at Benton Barracks, St. Louis, Missouri, by Captain Lewis Merrill, 2nd Cavalry Regiment, U.S.A., under authority of Major General John C. Frémont, commander of the U.S. Army's Department of the West. Merrill organized his regiment from September 3 to December 11, 1861. (An additional Co. "L" was organized at St. Louis, Mo., January 1, 1863, and Co. "M" was organized at Warrenton, Mo. on June 30, 1863.) Before organization of Regiment was completed, it was ordered to march to Springfield, Mo., September, 1861. Fremont's Campaign against Springfield, Mo., September–October. At Sedalia, Missouri, Mo., till January, 1862. Scout through Saline County, Missouri December 3–12, 1861. Expedition to Milford, Missouri December 15–19. Battle of Shawnee Mound or Milford, Blackwater River, December 18. Roan's Tan Yard, Silver Creek, January 8, 1862. Knob Noster, Missouri January 22. Attached to Department of Missouri September, 1861, to January, 1862. District of Northeast Missouri, Dept. of Missouri, to June, 1863. District of Southeast Missouri, Dept. of Missouri, to August, 1863. 1st Brigade, 1st Cavalry Division, Arkansas Expedition, to December, 1863. 2nd Brigade, 1st Cavalry Division, Army of Arkansas, to January, 1864. 2nd Brigade, 1st Cavalry Division, 7th Army Corps, Dept. of Arkansas, to May, 1864. 3rd Brigade, 2nd Division, 7th Army Corps, to September, 1864. 2nd Brigade, Cavalry Division, 7th Army Corps, to February, 1865. 2nd Brigade, Cavalry Division, District of West Tennessee, to muster out.

== Detailed Service ==
Moved to Northern Missouri and duty at Columbia, Glasgow, Sturgeon, Paris, Huntsville, Palmyra and Warrenton, operating against guerrillas and elements of the secessionist Missouri State Guard (MSG) January, 1862, to June, 1863. Expedition into Schuyler and Scotland Counties, against Porter's and Poindexter's MSG cavalry, July 12-August 8, 1862. Near Memphis, Mo., July 18. Brown Springs July 27. Moore's Mills, near Fulton, July 28. Kirksville August 6 (Detachment). Pursuit of Poindexter August 8–15, with skirmishes at Grand River, Lee's Ford, Chariton River and Walnut Creek, near Stockton, August 9. Switzler's Mill August 10. Little Compton Ferry, Yellow Creek, August 11. Roanoke September 6 (Detachment). Scotland and Boone Counties September 30 (Detachment). Joined Davidson's Cavalry Division at Pilot Knob June, 1863. Expedition to Little Rock, Ark., July 1-September 10. Grand Prairie August 17. Brownsville August 25. Bayou Metoe or Reed's Bridge August 27. Reconnaissance from Brownsville August 29. Bear Skin Lake, Ashby's Mills, September 7. Bayou Fourche and capture of Little Rock September 10. Pursuit of Price September 11–13. Near Little Rock September 11. Duty at Little Rock till March, 1864. Steele's Expedition to Camden March 23-May 3. Benton Road March 23–24. Okolona April 2–3. Prairie D'Ann April 9–12. Camden April 15–18. Moro Bottom April 25–26. Jenkins' Ferry, Saline River, April 30. Scatterville July 28. Duty in Arkansas till September. Operating against Price September and October. Booneville, Mo., October 9–12. Little Blue October 21. Big Blue, State Line, October 22. Westport October 23. Battle of Charlot October 25. Mine Creek, Osage River, Marias des Cygnes, October 25. Grierson's Expedition from Memphis against Mobile & Ohio Railroad December 21, 1864, to January 15, 1865 (Co. "E"). Near Memphis February 9 (Detachment). Moved to Chattanooga, Tenn., and duty operating against guerrillas in Georgia and Alabama and escorting trains from Chattanooga to Atlanta January to September, 1865. Mustered out September 19, 1865.

== Casualties ==
Regiment lost during service 3 Officers and 53 Enlisted men killed and mortally wounded and 1 Officer and 205 Enlisted men by disease. Total 262.

== Commanders ==
- Colonel Lewis Merrill
- Lieutenant Colonel John Y. Clopper

== See also ==
- Missouri Civil War Union units
- Missouri in the Civil War
