= Missouri State Militia =

Missouri State Militia may refer to any of several military organizations of the American Civil War:

- Missouri State Militia (pre-Missouri State Guard)
- Missouri State Guard
- Missouri State Militia (Union)
- Enrolled Missouri Militia
- Provisional Enrolled Missouri Militia

or rarely

- Missouri Home Guard (Union)
- Missouri Minutemen
