= 9th Missouri State Militia Cavalry Regiment =

- Active: February 1862 to July, 1865
- Country: United States
- Allegiance: Union
- Branch: Cavalry
- Engagements: Battle of Memphis, MO; Battle of Moore's Mill; Battle of Kirksville; Battle of Compton's Ferry; Battle of the Little Blue; Battle of the Big Blue; Battle of Westport; Battle of Marais des Cygnes; Battle of Mine Creek; Battle of Marmiton River

The 9th Missouri State Militia Cavalry Regiment, was a cavalry regiment that served as an element of the Union Army in the state of Missouri during the American Civil War. Unlike Militia units in other states, the 9th Missouri State Militia Cavalry was a full-time military unit, permanently engaged in internal counter-insurgency and protection of the state of Missouri from invasion by conventional Confederate units. The regiment was equipped and paid by the Federal government and was integrated into the Federal military structure in the Department of Missouri. The 9th MSM Cavalry was one of Missouri's most successful counter-guerrilla units.

== Service ==
The 9th Missouri State Militia Cavalry Regiment was raised by Colonel Odon Guitar, a successful lawyer and member of the Missouri General Assembly from Columbia, Missouri.

Organized at large in Missouri February 12, 1862. to September 20, 1863. Attached to District of Rolla, Dept. of Missouri, to February, 1863. District of North Missouri, Dept. of Missouri, to July, 1865.

Mustered out July 13, 1865.

== Casualties ==
Regiment lost during service 2 Officers and 29 Enlisted men killed and mortally wounded and 1 Officer and 76 Enlisted men by disease. Total 108.

== Commanders ==
- Brigadier General Odon Guitar, Missouri State Militia

== See also ==
- Missouri Civil War Union units
- Missouri in the Civil War
