= 168th Regiment =

168th Regiment may refer to:

- 168th Aviation Regiment
- 168th Field Artillery Regiment
- 168th Infantry Regiment (United States)
- 168 Pioneer Regiment RLC

== American Civil War regiments ==
- 168th New York Infantry Regiment
- 168th Ohio Infantry Regiment
