= William D. Dickey =

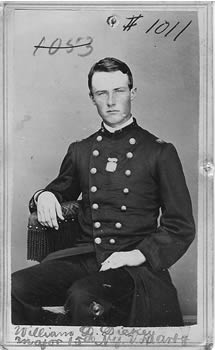
- Born: January 11, 1845; Newburgh, New York, US
- Died: May 14, 1924 (aged 79); New York City, New York, US
- Military career
- Allegiance: United States of America
- Branch: United States Army; Union Army
- Service years: 1862 - 1863, 1864 - 1865
- Rank: Major; Brevet Colonel
- Unit: (New York (state)) 15th New York Heavy Artillery Regiment
- Conflicts: Second Battle of Petersburg
- Awards: Medal of Honor

William Donaldson Dickey (January 11, 1845 – May 14, 1924) was an American soldier who received the Medal of Honor for valor during the American Civil War.

== Biography ==
Dickey was commissioned as a 1st lieutenant in November 1862, and assigned to the 168th New York Volunteer Infantry. He mustered out with the regiment in October 1863, and joined the 15th New York Heavy Artillery as a captain in February 1864. He was promoted to major in May 1865, and mustered out with the 15th New York Heavy Artillery in August 1865. Dickey received the Medal of Honor on June 10, 1896, for his actions at the Second Battle of Petersburg.

After the war, Dickey became a companion of the District of Columbia Commandery of the Military Order of the Loyal Legion of the United States.

== Medal of Honor citation ==
Citation:

Refused to leave the field, remaining in command after being wounded by a piece of shell, and led his command in the assault on the enemy's works on the following day.

== See also ==
- List of American Civil War Medal of Honor recipients: A-F
