= Benjamin F. Loan =

American politician (1819–1881)

Benjamin Franklin Loan
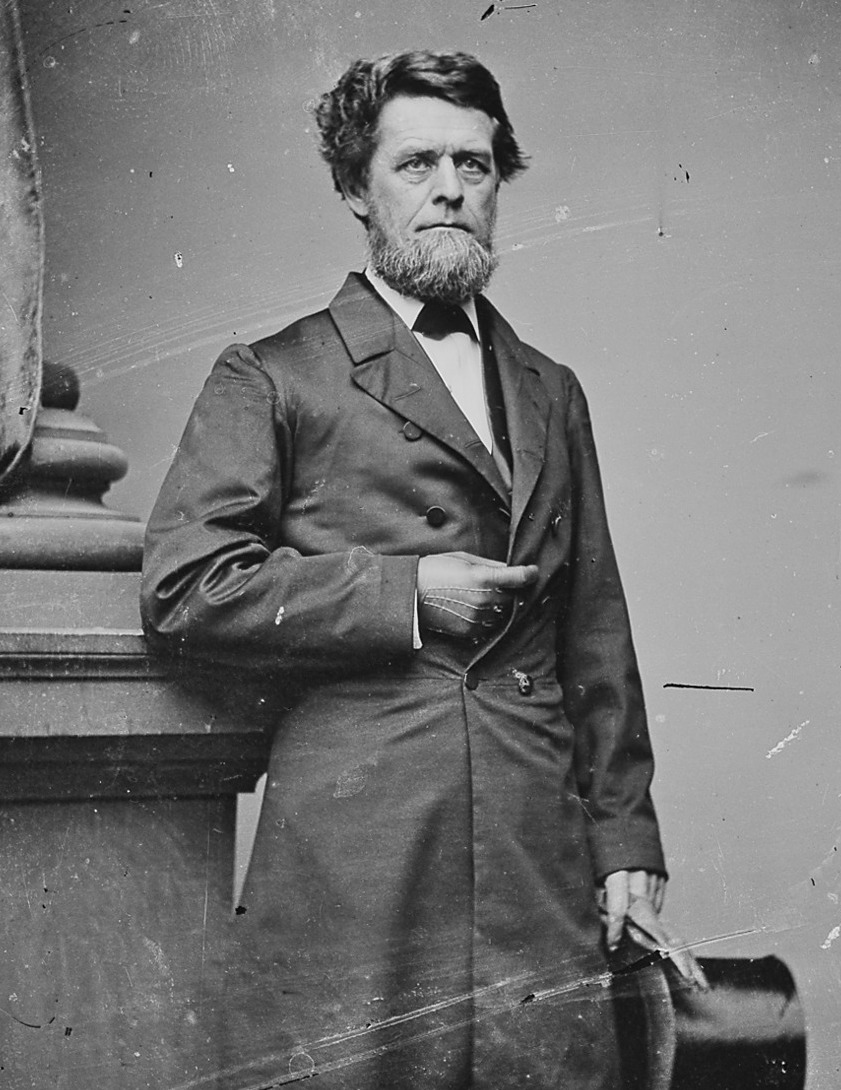

Member of the U.S. House of Representatives from Missouri's 7th district
- In office March 4, 1863 – March 3, 1869
- Preceded by: John William Noell
- Succeeded by: Joel Funk Asper

Personal details
- Born: October 4, 1819 Hardinsburg, Kentucky, U.S.
- Died: March 30, 1881 (aged 61) St. Joseph, Missouri, U.S.
- Resting place: Mount Mora Cemetery, St. Joseph, Missouri
- Party: Immediate Emancipation (1862–63); Radical Union (after 1863)
- Occupation: Lawyer, politician, general

Military service
- Allegiance: United States of America; Union
- Branch/service: Union Army
- Years of service: 1861–1863
- Rank: Brigadier General
- Unit: Missouri State Militia
- Battles/wars: American Civil War: Battle of Yellow Creek

Benjamin Franklin Loan (October 4, 1819 – March 30, 1881) was a U.S. representative from Missouri, as well as a Missouri State Militia general in service to the Union during the American Civil War.

== Biography ==
Benjamin F. Loan was born in Hardinsburg, Kentucky. He pursued an academic course and received a college education. He studied law in Kentucky, and then moved to St. Joseph, Missouri, in 1838. He was admitted to the bar in 1840 and practiced in St. Joseph.

With the outbreak of the Civil War, he was commissioned as a brigadier general in the Federal Missouri State Militia on November 27, 1861. General Loan participated in counter-guerrilla operations, including the victory against Colonel John A. Poindexter's irregular cavalry at the Battle of Yellow Creek on August 13, 1862. Loan was honorably discharged on June 8, 1863, and returned home.

Loan was elected as a Immediate Emancipationist to the Thirty-eighth Congress and reelected as a Radical Unionist to the Thirty-ninth and Fortieth Congresses (March 4, 1863 – March 3, 1869). He served as chairman of the Committee on Revolutionary Pensions (Fortieth Congress). He was an unsuccessful candidate for reelection in 1868 to the Forty-first Congress.

While in Congress, on June 7, 1867, he introduced a resolution that would have impeached President Andrew Johnson. At the time, many Radical Republicans desired to impeach the president, while much of the Republican Party's congressional caucus was not prepared to do so. While Loan's resolution was never voted on, the House did approve a separate resolution that day by James Mitchell Ashley which launched the first impeachment inquiry against Andrew Johnson.

He was appointed by President Ulysses S. Grant as a member of the board of visitors to the United States Military Academy in 1869. He resumed the practice of law in St. Joseph, Missouri, and served as delegate to the Republican National Convention in 1876. He was an unsuccessful candidate for election in 1876 to the Forty-fifth Congress.

Benjamin Loan died in St. Joseph, Missouri, and was interred in Mount Mora Cemetery.

U.S. House of Representatives
Preceded by John William Noell	Member of the U.S. House of Representatives from Missouri's 7th congressional district 1863–1869	Succeeded by Joel Funk Asper
