= 3rd Independent Battery Indiana Light Artillery =

- Active: August 24, 1861 – August 21, 1865
- Country: United States
- Allegiance: Union
- Branch: Artillery
- Equipment: 2 x M1857 12-pounder Napoleons, 2 x 14-pounder James rifles, 2 x M1841 6-pounder field guns (May 1864)
- Engagements: Battle of Moore's Mill (1 section); Battle of Kirksville (1 section); Battle of Lone Jack (1 section); Red River Campaign; Battle of Pleasant Hill; Battle of Yellow Bayou; Battle of Westport; Battle of Nashville; Battle of Spanish Fort; Battle of Fort Blakeley

3rd Indiana Battery Light Artillery (also known as Frybarger's Battery, Cockfair's Battery, Ginn's Battery, and Burn's Battery) was an artillery battery that served in the Union Army during the American Civil War.

== Service ==
The battery was organized at Connersville, Indiana and mustered in for a three-year enlistment on August 24, 1861, in Indianapolis, Indiana.

The battery was attached to Fremont's Army of the West and Department of the Missouri to February 1862. Jefferson City, Missouri, Department of the Missouri, to March 1862. Central District of Missouri, Department of the Missouri, to February 1863. District of Southwest Missouri, Department of the Missouri, to June 1863. District of Rolla, Missouri, Department of the Missouri, to July 1863. District of St. Louis, Missouri, Department of the Missouri, to January 1864. Artillery, 3rd Division, XVI Corps, Army of the Tennessee, to December 1864. 2nd Brigade, 2nd Division, Detachment Army of the Tennessee, Department of the Cumberland, to February 1865. Artillery, 1st Division, XVI Corps, Military Division West Mississippi, to August 1865.

The 3rd Indiana Battery Light Artillery mustered out of service on August 21, 1865, in Indianapolis.

== Detailed service ==
Moved to St. Louis, Missouri, September. Fremont's advance on Springfield, Missouri, September 23-November 2, 1861. Duty at Tipton and LaMine, Missouri, until February 1862. Duty at Jefferson City, Missouri, until November 1862. Expedition in Moniteau County and skirmish March 25–28. Campaign against Porter's and Poindexter's guerrillas July 20-September 10. Actions at Moore's Mills July 28; Kirksville August 6; near Stockton August 9; Lone Jack August 16. Duty at Springfield, Rolla, and St. Louis, Missouri, November 1862 to December 1863. Reenlisted November 30, 1863. Moved to Columbus, Kentucky. Smith's Campaign in western Tennessee against Forrest December 20–26. Moved to Vicksburg, Mississippi, January 23, 1864. Meridian Campaign February 3-March 2. Red River Campaign March 10-May 22. Fort DeRussy March 14. Occupation of Alexandria April 16. Battle of Pleasant Hill April 9. About Cloutiersville April 22–24. Cotile Landing April 25. Red River May 3–7. Retreat to Morganza May 13–20. Mansura May 16. Yellow Bayou May 18. Moved to Vicksburg May 19–24, then to Memphis, Tennessee, May 25-June 10. Old River Lake or Lake Chicot June 6. Smith's Expedition to Tupelo, Mississippi, July 5–21. Harrisburg, near Tupelo, July 14–15. Old Town (or Tishamingo Creek) July 15. Smith's Expedition to Oxford, Mississippi, August 1–30. Moved to Jefferson Barracks, Missouri, September 8–19. Expedition to Do Soto September 20-October 1. March through Missouri in pursuit of Price October 2-November 19. Moved to Nashville, Tennessee, November 25-December 1. Battle of Nashville December 15–16. Pursuit of Hood to the Tennessee River December 17–28. Moved to Eastport, Mississippi, and duty there until February 1865. Expedition from Eastport to Iuka January 9, 1865. Moved to New Orleans, Louisiana, February 7–22. Campaign against Mobile and its defenses March 17-April 12. Siege of Spanish Fort and Fort Blakely March 26-April 8. Fort Blakely April 9. Capture of Mobile April 12. March to Montgomery April 13–25. Duty at Montgomery and Selma till July 30 when the battery was ordered to Indianapolis, Indiana.

== Armament ==
According to a report by Lieutenant Thomas J. Ginn, at the Battle of Yellow Bayou on May 18, 1864, the battery's guns consisted of two M1857 12-pounder Napoleons, two 14-pounder James rifles, and two M1841 6-pounder field guns.

== Casualties ==
The battery lost a total of 29 men during service; 1 officer and 10 enlisted men killed or mortally wounded, 18 enlisted men died of disease.

== Commanders ==
- Captain William Watton Frybarger - (August 24, 1861 - November 30, 1861).
- Captain James M. Cockefair - (December 9, 1861 - dismissed by court-martial for disloyalty).
- Captain Thomas J. Ginn - commanded at the battle of Nashville as 1st lieutenant (December 27, 1864 - June 13, 1875).
- Captain Richard Burns - (June 14, 1865 - mustered out with battery).
- Lieutenant Adolphus G. Armington - commanded one section at the Battle of Moore's Mill on July 28, 1862.
- 2nd Lieutenant James S. Develin - commanded one section at the Battle of Lone Jack; mortally wounded in action on August 16, 1862.

== See also ==
- List of Indiana Civil War regiments
- Indiana in the Civil War
