= Second Battle of Springfield =

January 8, 1863, battle in the American Civil War

Coordinates: 37.1950°N 93.3021°W

- Part of the Trans-Mississippi Theater of the American Civil War
Date	January 8, 1863
Location	Springfield, Missouri
Result	Union victory

Belligerents
United States (Union)	(Confederate States of America) CSA (Confederacy)

Commanders and leaders
Egbert B. Brown	John S. Marmaduke

Units involved
Southwestern District of Missouri	4th Division, I Corps, Trans-Mississippi Department

Strength
2,099	1,870

Casualties and losses
231 total 30 killed 195 wounded 6 missing	~290 total

The Second Battle of Springfield took place during the American Civil War on January 8, 1863, in Springfield, Missouri. It is sometimes known as The Battle of Springfield. (The First Battle of Springfield was fought on October 25, 1861, and there was also the better-known Battle of Wilson's Creek, fought nearby on August 10, 1861.) Fighting was urban and house-to-house, which was rare in the war.

== Prelude ==
On December 31, 1862, three columns of cavalry under the command of Confederate Brigadier General John S. Marmaduke left Pocahontas, Arkansas and Lewisburg, Arkansas, and moved north on separate roads toward Missouri and the Union supply line. Marmaduke's immediate objective was the destruction of the Union Army of the Frontier's wagon trains and supply line between Rolla and Springfield. If successful, Marmaduke would cause elements of the Army of the Frontier to withdraw from Arkansas and pursue Marmaduke's Division.

Marmaduke's main column proceeded north through Forsyth, Missouri, where Marmaduke learned from scouts that the Union army's major supply depot at Springfield was weakly defended. To clear the way for his Confederates, Marmaduke marched on Ozark, Missouri. The Union garrison stationed at Ozark withdrew and the Confederates burned its abandoned fort. A second column, commanded by Colonel Emmett MacDonald, destroyed the Union fort ("Fort Lawrence") at Lawrence Mill on Beaver Creek, about ten miles (16 km) southwest of Ava. A dispatch to the third column under Colonel Joseph C. Porter directed Porter to join Marmaduke at Springfield rather than at Hartville. If everything went as planned, all three commands would converge on Springfield in an attempt to capture the city's lightly defended warehouses of military supplies.

== Preparation ==
Late in the afternoon of January 7, 1863, Federals from the Ozark garrison reached Springfield and informed the local commander, Brigadier General Egbert Brown, that a Confederate cavalry force, with an estimated strength somewhere between 4,000 and 6,000 men, was headed for Springfield. Having only 1343 veteran soldiers, Brown mulled over two options. He could destroy all of the Union Army of the Frontier's winter supplies at Springfield and retreat, or he could defend the town. General Grant on December 23, 1862, had published a major censure of the Union commander and forces stationed at Holly Springs, Mississippi, which had participated in the disgraceful surrender of Grant's Holly Springs supply depot. No doubt, Brown recalling this censure, had a strong reason to favor the defense of Springfield.

Brown's subordinates favored the defense of the city also. The Fourth Military District's commanding general, Colley B. Holland, immediately sent dispatches to the surrounding communities, calling the Enrolled Missouri Militia to active duty with orders to hurry to Springfield. Brown also ordered the removal of 50,000 rations from Springfield into Fort Number 1 and prepared for the burning of the armory in the event of defeat. Meanwhile, at Dr. Samuel Melcher's suggestion, Captain Byron Carr mounted three cannon onto wagon wheels.

During the following morning, the Federals issued arms and ammunition to soldiers and civilians alike. Although Springfield was lightly garrisoned, it had one distinct advantage. It was surrounded by a network of four nearly completed earthen forts and a stockaded college building. Each of the five points commanded the high ground.

== Battle ==
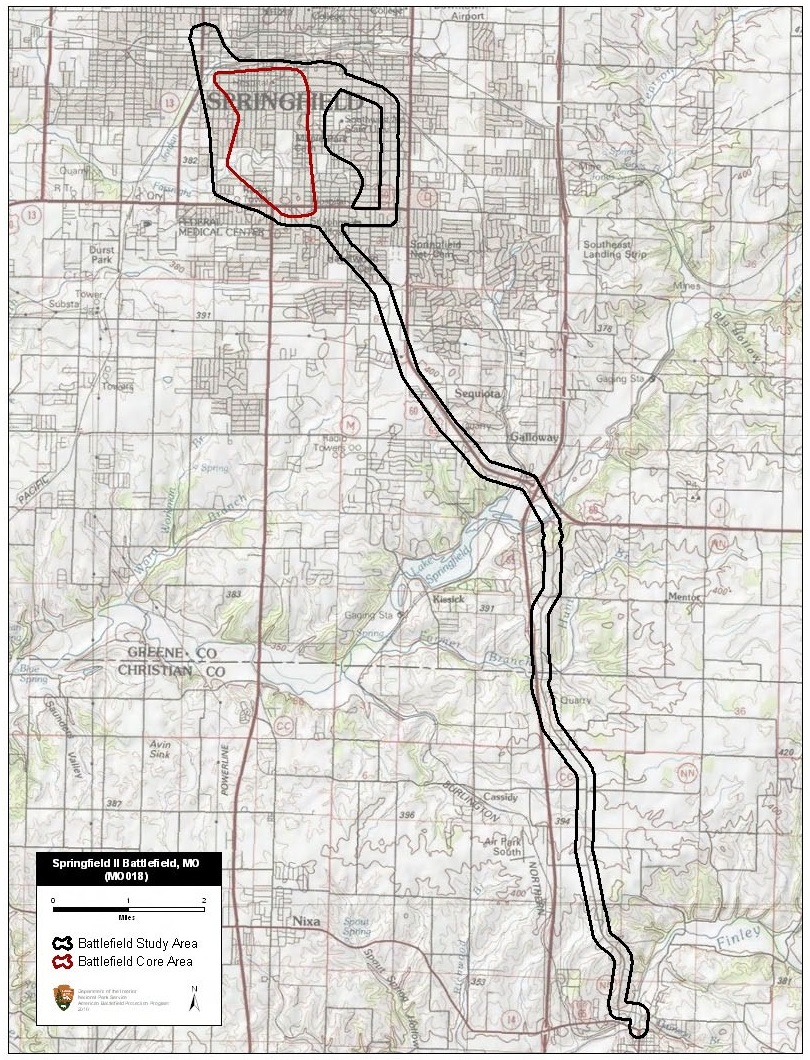
Map of Springfield II Battlefield core and study areas by the American Battlefield Protection Program.

As the morning of January 8, 1863 dawned, two of the Confederate columns under Marmaduke approached Springfield from the south. Since Porter's and MacDonald's columns had yet to arrive, Marmaduke occupied the early morning with foraging and capturing some of the Enrolled Missouri Militia about five miles (8.0 km) from Springfield. With MacDonald finally present by 10:00 a.m., the Confederates dismounted two regiments about three miles (4.8 km) from Springfield and advanced to feel out the Union lines and develop their strength. After the Confederates had pushed two Union Missouri State Militia Cavalry Regiments two miles (3.2 km) north, the smoking ruins of burning homes on the outskirts of Springfield came into view. To provide an unobstructed view for his artillery inside Fort No. 4 (located on the east side of South Avenue between Elm and Cherry Streets), Brown at the last minute ordered ten homes burned along South Avenue.

Colonel Joseph Orville Shelby took command of the tactical operations, launching piecemeal assaults upon the Union center and west flank. The Confederates advanced over open ground against Fort Number 4, seeking such shelter as they could get from tree stumps, piles of rock, and the charred remains of the homes burned by the Union forces. Despite repeated efforts, the assault on the fort failed.

Shelby then resolved to take Springfield by an oblique attack from the west. The Confederates were drawn by the cover offered by a ravine that led uphill toward town from what is now the intersection of Grand Avenue and Grant Street. At the head of this draw stood a two-story brick academy surrounded by a stockade. Used by the Federals as a prison, it stood near the northwest corner of what is now the intersection of Campbell Avenue and State Street. The Union forces failed to garrison the college stockade, so the Confederates were able to seize the building easily and use it as their own fortress to return the fire from Fort No. 4. However, heavy fighting soon erupted around the stockade as the Union forces attempted to retake the college and stockade. The Confederates found a local advantage in numbers and pressed their own attack. This phase of the assault saw the most severe casualties, hand-to-hand fighting, and the capture of a cannon by the Confederates. Union troops on the west flank also were pushed back to College Street from their original position along the Old Wire Road and State Street. But Union reinforcements halted the Confederate drive and even pushed back the Confederates to the vicinity of State Street.

With the sun sinking, Marmaduke launched a final assault against Fort No. 4. The Union forces again repelled the attack. As night fell, the Confederates withdrew down the Ozark Road to the Phelps farm (now Phelps Grove Park). The Battle of Springfield had ended, and the Union supply depot was safe.

== Aftermath ==
Of the approximately 2,099 Union troops engaged, 19 were killed or missing and 146 were wounded for a total loss of 165 men (7.9 Percent). Two months later the total killed would reach 30, the missing in action would stand at 6, and 195 had been wounded. Of the approximately 1,870 Confederate troops present, at least 45 were killed or missing and 105 were wounded for a total loss of at least 150 men (8.0 percent). Marmaduke admitted that the Confederate returns were incomplete. Author Frederick Goman uses several period reports to arrive at an estimate of 70–80 killed, 12 captured, and 200 wounded.

The absence of Porter's column greatly impacted Marmaduke's chance for success at Springfield. Within four days, the Confederate raiders retreated to Arkansas. Springfield continued to remain an important supply and medical center for the Union army in the West.

A series of twelve interpretive markers have recently been placed throughout downtown Springfield at the important sites of the battle. They are intended to be visited in sequence on a walking tour. The first marker is located at Park Central Square, where it was removed from its original location at Street and Water Street.

Among the Confederate dead was Spencer McCoy, son of Kansas City, Missouri founder John C. McCoy. The elder McCoy was allowed to come to Springfield to claim his son who is buried with him in Union Cemetery in Kansas City.
