= Odon Guitar =

American politician

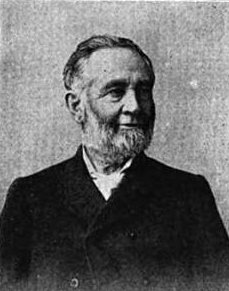
- Born: August 31, 1825; Madison County, Kentucky
- Died: March 13, 1908 (aged 82); Columbia, Missouri
- Burial place: Columbia Cemetery
- Military career
- Allegiance: United States of America; Union
- Branch: Missouri State Militia (Union)
- Service years: 1862–1864
- Rank: Brigadier General
- Commands: District of Central Missouri / District of Rolla
- Conflicts: Mexican–American War; American Civil War; Battle of Moore's Mill; Battle of Compton's Ferry; Battle of Yellow Creek; Shelby's Raid (1863)

Odon Guitar (August 31, 1825 – March 13, 1908) was a general in the Union Missouri State Militia during the American Civil War. He was noted for his successful campaign against Joseph C. Porter and John A. Poindexter's recruiting commands in northern Missouri.

== Early life and career ==
Odon Guitar was born in Richmond, Madison County, Kentucky, to John Guitar and Emily Gordon. His father had emigrated from Bordeaux, France, and met his mother in Kentucky. They moved to Boone County, Missouri, in 1827.

Odon Guitar was an excellent student and enrolled in the initial class of the University of Missouri in 1842, graduating in 1846 with an A.B. degree. He was unable to give his commencement address because at the time he was off with Alexander Doniphan's Expedition in the Mexican War. As a result, his degree was the first conferred by the university "in absentia." Having distinguished himself, he returned from the war in 1847.

Guitar studied law under his uncle, John B. Gordon, and was admitted to the bar in 1848. He left to participate in the California gold rush, returning to Columbia, Missouri, to resume his law practice in October 1851.

Guitar became involved in Whig politics and was elected to two terms in the Missouri House of Representatives (1854–1856 and 1858–1860.)

== Civil War ==
Although Guitar had been a slaveholder, he declared for the Union in a May 1861 speech in Columbia that caught the notice of George Caleb Bingham, who observed, "Guitar is the truest man you have among you, all honor to him."

In February 1862, provisional Missouri Governor Hamilton Rowan Gamble granted Guitar authority to recruit a regiment in central Missouri, and on May 3, Guitar received his commission as colonel of the Ninth Missouri State Militia Cavalry.

Guitar and his command were soon engaged in a campaign against Confederate guerrillas and recruiters. Guitar had key roles in defeating both Joseph C. Porter and John A. Poindexter. Guitar's command won a desperate fight against Porter at the Battle of Moore's Mill in Callaway County, Missouri, in late July, but he took ill shortly thereafter and was unable to participate in the key engagement at the Battle of Kirksville that forced the dispersion of Porter's command. Guitar then turned to pursuing Poindexter, overrunning him and completely scattering his command at the Battle of Compton's Ferry and the subsequent fight at Yellow Creek. Wounded, Poindexter could only evade capture for a few weeks and would never again serve the Confederacy.

In recognition of his victories, Colonel Guitar was breveted to brigadier general by Major General John Schofield on August 18, 1862, and he was nominated as brigadier general of Volunteers on January 19, 1863, by Abraham Lincoln, but the Senate did not approve the appointment. Although Guitar continued to use and was addressed by the title of brigadier general from August to January, afterward he reverted to colonel until he finally officially achieved the title of brigadier general of the Missouri State Militia on June 27, 1863.

On July 6, 1863, he was given command of the District of Northern Missouri. As a slaveholder himself and attempting to respect the rights of Southerners in his district, he received severe criticism from more radical Unionists. He was relieved of that command on March 25, 1864, and assigned command of the Rolla District. Guitar was relieved of the Rolla District command on August 23, and on August 31, 1864, Guitar resigned his militia commission and returned to practicing law.

== Postbellum career ==
Guitar married Kate Leonard, the daughter of Judge Abiel Leonard, on December 26, 1865, and raised seven children.

Guitar was president of the Boone County Bar Association until 1878, and he achieved a legendary record of success in defending homicide cases. He supported education, becoming curator of the University of Missouri and as president of the Columbia Board of Education. Guitar was a member of the Republican Party after the war.

Odon Guitar died at his home in Columbia on March 13, 1908, and is buried in Columbia Cemetery.
