= 171st Ohio Infantry Regiment =

- Active: May 7, 1864, to August 20, 1864
- Country: United States
- Allegiance: Union
- Branch: Infantry
- Engagements: Battle of Cynthiana

The 171st Ohio Infantry Regiment, sometimes 171st Ohio Volunteer Infantry (or 171st OVI) was an infantry regiment in the Union Army during the American Civil War.

== Service ==
The 171st Ohio Infantry was organized in Sandusky, Ohio, and mustered in May 7, 1864, for 100 days service under the command of Colonel Joel F. Asper.

The regiment served guard and fatigue duty at Johnson's Island until June 8. Moved to Covington, Kentucky, then to Cynthiana, Kentucky. Attached to General Hobson's Command, District of Kentucky, Department of the Ohio. Action at Kellar's Bridge, near Cynthiana, June 11. At Cynthiana, June 12. After putting up strong resistance at John Hunt Morgan, the regiment was captured, robbed, and paroled June 13 and ordered to Camp Dennison near Cincinnati, Ohio. Served duty there and at Johnson's Island, until August.

The 171st Ohio Infantry mustered out of service August 20, 1864.

== Ohio National Guard ==
Over 35,000 Ohio National Guardsmen were federalized and organized into regiments for 100 days service in May 1864. Shipped to the Eastern Theater, they were designed to be placed in "safe" rear areas to protect railroads and supply points, thereby freeing regular troops for Lt. Gen. Ulysses S. Grant’s push on the Confederate capital of Richmond, Virginia. As events transpired, many units found themselves in combat, stationed in the path of Confederate Gen. Jubal Early’s veteran Army of the Valley during its famed Valley Campaigns of 1864. Ohio Guard units met the battle-tested foe head on and helped blunt the Confederate offensive thereby saving Washington, D.C. from capture. Ohio National Guard units participated in the battles of Monacacy, Fort Stevens, Harpers Ferry, and in the siege of Petersburg.

== Casualties ==
The regiment lost 32 enlisted men during service; 17 men killed or mortally wounded, 15 men due to disease.

== Commanders ==
- Colonel Joel F. Asper

== Notable members ==
- Colonel Joel F. Asper - U.S. Representative from Missouri, 1869-1871

== See also ==
- List of Ohio Civil War units
- Ohio in the Civil War
