= Battle of Yellow Creek (1862) =

Battle of the American Civil War

Coordinates: 39.579232°N 93.228021°W

- Part of the Trans-Mississippi Theater of the American Civil War
Date	August 13, 1862
Location	Yellow Creek, Chariton County, Missouri
Result	Union victory

Belligerents
United States	Confederate States

Commanders and leaders
(United States) Odon Guitar (United States) Benjamin F. Loan	John A. Poindexter

Strength
~700	Unknown

Casualties and losses
Two Wounded	Unknown

The Battle of Yellow Creek, also known as Skirmish at Yellow Creek, was an action during the American Civil War, occurring August 13, 1862, along the Yellow Creek in Chariton County, Missouri.

The Battle of Yellow Creek followed an earlier battle at Compton's Ferry, on August 11. During that action Colonel John A. Poindexter and his force of 1200 to 1500 Confederate recruits were caught by Federal forces under Union Colonel Odon Guitar while crossing the Grand River. Poindexter's forces suffered significant losses and continued to retreat to Chariton County.

Union forces including the 9th Missouri State Militia Cavalry and Merrill's Horse (2nd Missouri Volunteer Cavalry) under Guitar and Brigadier General Benjamin F. Loan pursued Poindexter, intercepting his force two days later at Yellow Creek. Poindexter's force was routed and effectively ceased to exist. Poindexter was wounded in the action, but escaped. He was later captured on September 1, 1862. He was wearing civilian clothes at the time.

Federal authorities debated executing Poindexter (who held a Confederate commission) as a spy or guerrilla (because he had been captured within Federal lines out of uniform), but instead, released him on parole. This was after he publicly disavowed guerrilla warfare.

The strategic result of the battle was a culmination of a campaign which led to the effective suppression of Confederate recruiting efforts and major guerrilla operations north of the Missouri River in the northwest Missouri.

The battle also led to a unique law that was enacted by the Missouri State Legislature the following year (1863), for the benefit of a trooper of Colonel Guitar's 9th Missouri State Militia Cavalry:

“AN ACT for the benefit of Frank Matinck

WHEREAS, At the battle of Yellow Creek, on Grand River, in the year 1862, between the forces of the Ninth Missouri Cavalry, under Colonel Guitar, and the rebel forces under Poindexter, Frank Martinck, a corporal in Company “E” of said regiment, was, by accident, shot in the hand by the discharge of his own gun, the wound being of so aggravated a character that the amputation of his arm became necessary in order to save his life; therefore,

Be it enacted by the General Assembly of the State of Missouri, as follows:

1. The said Frank Martinck is hereby authorized to keep a beer saloon at one place in the county of Cole, in the State of Missouri, and to sell thereat beer, ale, cider, cakes, candy, toys, manufactured tobacco, cigars, and such like articles at said stand, without taking a license therefor, either state, county or corporation, so that he do not sell distilled or spirituous liquors at said place.

2. This act shall take effect and be in force from and after its passage. Approved March 17, 1863.”
