= Joel Funk Asper =

American politician

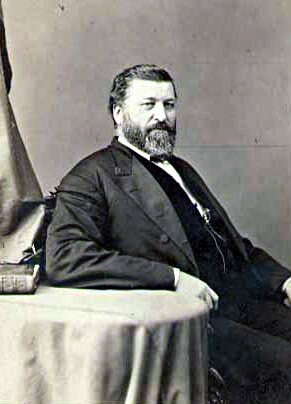

Member of the U.S. House of Representatives from Missouri's 7th district
- In office March 4, 1869 – March 3, 1871
- Preceded by: Benjamin F. Loan
- Succeeded by: Isaac C. Parker

Personal details
- Born: April 20, 1822 Adams County, Pennsylvania, U.S.
- Died: October 1, 1872 (aged 50) Chillicothe, Missouri, U.S.
- Party: Republican
- Profession: Lawyer

Joel Funk Asper (April 20, 1822 – October 1, 1872) was a U.S. representative from Missouri.

== Early life and education ==
Born in Adams County, Pennsylvania, Asper moved to Ohio with his parents, who settled in Trumbull County in 1827. He attended the public schools and the local college in Warren, Ohio. He studied law. He was admitted to the bar in 1844 and commenced practice in Warren, Ohio.

== Early career ==
He served as a Justice of the Peace in 1846. He served as prosecuting attorney of Geauga County in 1847. Asper served as a delegate to the Buffalo Free-Soil Convention in 1848. He was editor of the Western Reserve Chronicle in 1849. He moved to Iowa in 1850 and published the Chardon Democrat.

== Civil War service ==
Asper raised a company for the Civil War in 1861 and served as its captain. He was wounded in the Battle of Winchester.

He was promoted to the rank of lieutenant colonel in 1862. He mustered out of the service in 1863, because of wounds received in action.

He became the Colonel of the 171st Ohio (a One Hundred Day Regiment) in May 1864 to August 1864. He served at the Prisoner of War Camp at Johnson's Island, Ohio. He was forced to surrender to John Hunt Morgan seven of the regiment's companies at Keller's Bridge, Kentucky, on June 12, 1864. The units were illegally paroled. Asper and the regiment returned to Johnson's Island. He mustered out at end of term of service.

== Other pursuits ==
He moved to Chillicothe, Missouri, in 1864 and resumed the practice of law in partnership with Henry M. Pollard. He founded the Spectator in 1866. He served as delegate to the Republican National Convention in 1868.

== Congress ==
Asper was elected as a Republican to the Forty-first Congress (March 4, 1869 – March 3, 1871). He was not a candidate for renomination in 1870.

== Death and legacy ==
Asper practiced law until his death. He died in Chillicothe, Missouri, on October 1, 1872. He was interred in Edgewood Cemetery.

== Sources ==
- United States Congress. "Joel Funk Asper (id: A000320)". Biographical Directory of the United States Congress.

U.S. House of Representatives
Preceded by Benjamin F. Loan	Member of the U.S. House of Representatives from Missouri's 7th congressional district 1869–1871	Succeeded by Isaac C. Parker
