= Battle of Cynthiana =

Battle of the American Civil War

Coordinates: 38.4070°N 84.3056°W

- Part of the American Civil War
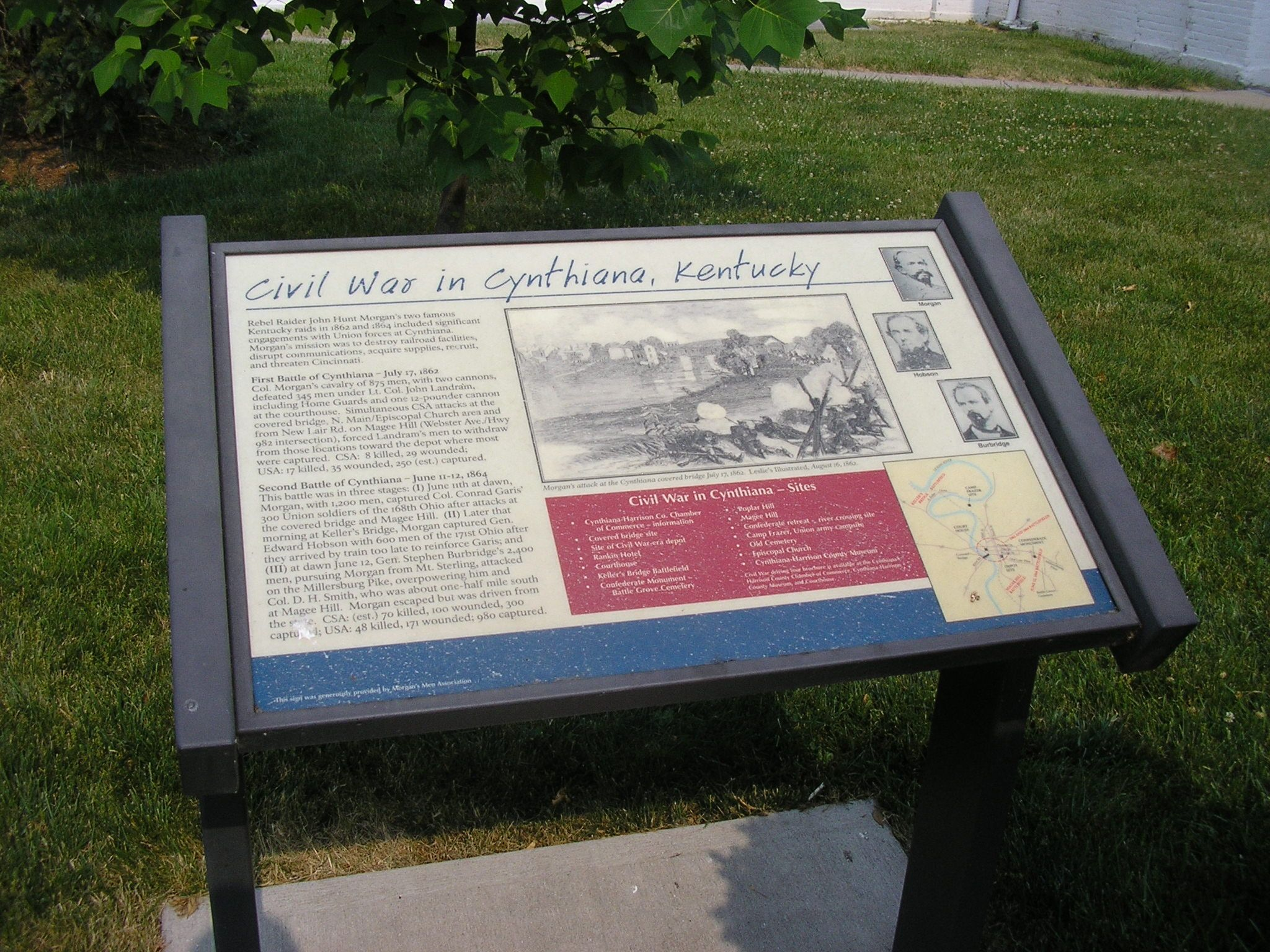
- Interpretive panel in Cynthiana
Date	June 11–12, 1864
Location	Cynthiana, Kentucky
Result	Union victory

Belligerents
United States (Union)	(Confederate States of America) CSA (Confederacy)

Commanders and leaders
Conrad Garis; Edward H. Hobson; Stephen Gano Burbridge	John H. Morgan; H. L. Giltner; D. Howard Smith; Robert M. Martin

Units involved
168th Ohio Infantry; 171st Ohio Infantry; Harrison County Home Guards; 7th Ohio Cavalry; 12th Ohio Cavalry; 9th Michigan Cavalry; 11th Michigan Cavalry; 16th Kentucky Cavalry; 30th Kentucky Infantry; 39th Kentucky Infantry; 37th Kentucky Infantry; 40th Kentucky Infantry; 45th Kentucky Infantry; 47th Kentucky Infantry; 52nd Kentucky Infantry; Battery "C" Kentucky Light Artillery	1st Kentucky Special Cavalry Battalion; 2nd Kentucky Special Cavalry Battalion; 3rd Kentucky Special Cavalry Battalion; 4th Kentucky Cavalry; 10th Kentucky Cavalry Battalion; 1st Kentucky Mounted Rifles Battalion; 2nd Kentucky Mounted Rifles Battalion; 10th Kentucky Mounted Rifles Battalion; 6th Confederate Battalion

Strength
2400	1,200

Casualties and losses
Total:1,229 Killed: 48 Wounded: 171 Captured: 980	Total:470 Killed: 70 Wounded: 100 Captured: 300

The Battle of Cynthiana, or more specifically the Second Battle of Cynthiana or the Battle of Kellar's Bridge, included three separate engagements during the American Civil War that were fought on June 11 and 12, 1864, in Harrison County, Kentucky, in and near the town of Cynthiana. This was part of Confederate Brigadier General John H. Morgan's 1864 Raid into Kentucky. The battle ultimately resulted in a victory by Union forces over the raiders and ended Morgan's Last Kentucky Raid in defeat. Morgan's command had previously captured the town in the First Battle of Cynthiana, July 17, 1862.

At dawn on June 11, 1864, Brig. Gen. John H. Morgan approached Cynthiana with 1,200 cavalrymen. The town was defended by a small Union force under Colonel Conrad Garis, commanding five companies of the 168th Ohio Infantry and some home guard troops, about 300 men all together. Morgan divided his troops into two columns which approached the town from the south and east, and launched an attack at the covered bridge, driving Garis' forces back towards the Kentucky Central Railroad depot and north along the railroad towards the Rankin House, which Federal troops used as a fortified position. Having no artillery in which to drive the Federals from their positions, the Confederates set fire to the town, destroying thirty-seven buildings and killing some of the Union troops.

As the fighting flared in Cynthiana, another Union force, about 500 men of the 171st Ohio Infantry (along with 30 men from the 47th Regiment Kentucky Volunteer Mounted Infantry and 70 men from the 52nd Regiment Kentucky Volunteer Mounted Infantry) under the overall command of Brigadier General Edward Hobson, arrived by train about a mile north of the Cynthiana at Keller's Bridge, the bridge having been burned by a detachment of Morgan's command a few days prior. This force fought portions of Morgan's force for about six hours. Eventually Morgan trapped this new Union force in a meander of the Licking River. All together, Morgan had about 1,300 Union prisoners of war camping with him overnight in line of battle. The 171st Ohio Infantry was paroled the next day. This engagement, Morgan's last victory, was known as the Battle of Keller's Bridge [bridge named for Abraham Keller, not spelled "Kellar"].

With little ammunition, Morgan recklessly decided to stay and fight an expected larger Union force. Brigadier General Stephen G. Burbridge with 2,400 men, a combined force of Ohio, Kentucky, and Michigan mounted infantry and cavalry, along with a section of artillery, attacked Morgan at dawn on June 12, this action taking place on the hills east of town. The Union forces drove the Rebels back, causing them to flee into Cynthiana, where many were captured or killed. General Morgan and many of his officers escaped. Combined casualties in the separate Union forces were 1,092 men, while Morgan is estimated to have lost about 1,000 men, although no firm records exist.

Cynthiana demonstrated that Union numbers and mobility were starting to take their toll; Confederate cavalry and partisans could no longer raid with impunity.

== See also ==
- List of battles fought in Kentucky
