= Enrolled Missouri Militia =

The Enrolled Missouri Militia was a state militia organization of Missouri in 1862 during the American Civil War. It was a part-time force whose primary purpose was to serve as garrison and infrastructure guards, both to augment the Unionist Missouri State Militia in defense versus raids and to free the Missouri State Militia for offensive operations versus Confederate guerrillas and recruiters.

== Background ==
In Missouri at the beginning of the Civil War, volunteer Unionist Home Guard regiments were formed with the blessing of Federal authorities to oppose neutralist Governor Claiborne Jackson's state militia and his intention to discourage Missouri enlistments into Federal service. Brigadier General Nathaniel Lyon was given authority by the War Department to organize the Home Guard on June 11, 1861.

By late 1861 most of the Home Guard regiments had been disbanded. They were replaced by a smaller Six-month Militia under state rather than Federal control. This too was disbanded in January 1862, to be replaced by the Missouri State Militia (almost entirely cavalry.)

Following the Battle of Pea Ridge and the resulting Confederate withdrawal from northern Arkansas, recruiters were dispatched throughout Missouri in an attempt to rebuild the Confederate forces. Pro-southern guerrillas aided the recruiters and often fought alongside them.

Guerrilla warfare plagued Missouri from the start of the conflict in Missouri, but intensified in early 1862 as the weather warmed. To combat the growing guerrilla menace, General Henry W. Halleck issued General Order Number 2 on March 13:

Evidence has been received at these headquarters that Maj. Gen. Sterling Price has issued commissions or licenses to certain bandits in this State, authorizing them to raise "guerrilla forces," for the purpose of plunder and marauding. General Price ought to know that such a course is contrary to the rules of civilized warfare, and that every man who enlists in such an organization forfeits his life and becomes an outlaw. All persons are hereby warned that if they join any guerrilla band they will not, if captured, be treated as ordinary prisoners of war, but will be hung as robbers and murderers. Their lives shall atone for the barbarity of their general.

Confederate President Jefferson Davis responded on April 21, 1862 and attempted to regulate guerrilla warfare by authorizing commissions for those forming bands of "partisan rangers," who would follow the rules of war and eventually join the Confederate forces. However, this was not recognized by the United States authorities. On May 29 Brigadier General John Schofield responded with General Order No. 18 to the Missouri State Militia which read in part:

When caught in arms, engaged in their unlawful warfare, they will be shot down upon the spot.

== Creation of Enrolled Missouri Militia ==
As guerrilla warfare and recruiting increased, and as the state had been stripped of nearly all but the volunteer Missouri State Militia Cavalry regiments, General Schofield took a more drastic measure. With the aid of Missouri's provisional Governor Hamilton Rowan Gamble, a compulsory militia enrollment was declared on July 22, 1862, the Enrolled Missouri Militia. Schofield issued General Orders No. 19 requiring loyal men to enroll in the militia, required registration of all who had previously taken up arms against the United States, and for them to surrender their weapons. The disloyal and Confederate sympathizers would not be required to enroll in the militia, but would have to declare their sympathies, which many were unwilling to do and instead enrolled.

The new Enrolled Missouri Militia could be called up in time of emergency to garrison key points in their locale or even to disrupt guerrilla encampments nearby. Many were not provided with uniforms and soon after their formation would wear white hatbands as a form of identification.

== Impact ==
While these orders did raise a militia force for garrison duty and local policing that freed the Missouri State Militia for active pursuit of guerrillas and recruiters, the policies also forced those of Southern loyalties to choose sides. Thousands chose the brush, guerrilla bands, or to seek out recruiters to join the Southern army.

Confederate recruiters such as John A. Poindexter and Joseph C. Porter in northeast Missouri would immediately benefit from the order as their numbers were soon swelled by disaffected Southerners. For a time the Enrolled Militia enrollment appeared counterproductive, but within a month both Confederate forces had been beaten and scattered after defeats at Moore's Mill, the Battle of Kirksville, and at Compton's Ferry. The new Enrolled Militia regiments increased the Union presence throughout the state while the Missouri State Militia drove out the recruiters and their regiments. Despite this, approximately 5,000 Southerners did succeed in making their way from northern Missouri to join the Confederate army in Arkansas.

It was more difficult for the Union to reassert control in western Missouri south of the Missouri River. Upton Hays, John Hughes, Jerry Coffee, Jeremiah "Vard" Cockrell, and Jo Shelby were all busy recruiting Confederate regiments during this same period. They were aided by William Quantrill's guerrillas, who made common cause with them. At the First Battle of Independence Hays, Hughes, and Quantrill succeeded in capturing Independence and its garrison (a battalion of the 7th Missouri Cavalry.) Hays, Cockrell, and Coffee then defeated another force at the Battle of Lone Jack. The newly recruited Confederate regiments were able to withdraw intact to Arkansas.

With the departure of the recruiters, the major crisis in Missouri had passed. Guerrilla warfare and raids would continue but would never reach the peak that occurred in the Summer of 1862.

== Other problems ==
Since the enrolled militia were called up locally as needed and uniforms were not provided, they did not create an unmanageable financial burden. The formation of the Enrolled Missouri Militia was an arrangement between Schofield and Gamble that had not received the full consent of the Federal authorities. As a result, only a few would later be eligible for Federal pensions.

There were also problems of reliability and loyalty. Some of the units were composed primarily of pro-Southern men and officers. This resulted in some companies being disbanded. Eventually another organization, the Provisional Enrolled Missouri Militia, would be formed from the more reliable militia.

== Bibliography ==
- Banasik, Michael E. (1996). Embattled Arkansas: The Prairie Grove Campaign of 1862. Broadfoot Pub Co. ISBN 978-1568373089.
- Nichols, Bruce. Guerrilla Warfare in Civil War Missouri, 1862 (2012 Reprint ed.). Mcfarland. ISBN 978-0786469277.
