= 168th Ohio Infantry Regiment =

- Active: May 19, 1864, to September 8, 1864
- Country: United States
- Allegiance: Union
- Branch: Infantry
- Engagements: Battle of Cynthiana

The 168th Ohio Infantry Regiment, sometimes 168th Ohio Volunteer Infantry (or 168th OVI) was an infantry regiment in the Union Army during the American Civil War.

== Service ==
The 168th Ohio Infantry was organized at Camp Dennison near Cincinnati, Ohio, and mustered on May 19, 1864, for 100 days service under the command of Colonel Conrad Garis.

The regiment left Ohio for Covington, Kentucky, May 19. Detachments were stationed at Falmouth, Kentucky, and Cynthiana, Kentucky, guarding railroad lines and bridges. Participated in operations against John Hunt Morgan May 31-June 20. Action at Cynthiana June 9 (detachment captured). Cynthiana, June 11. Duty in Kentucky until July 10. Moved to Camp Dennison July 11. Guard duty there and at Cincinnati until September 8.

The 168th Ohio Infantry mustered out of service September 8, 1864, at Cincinnati.

== Ohio National Guard ==
Over 35,000 Ohio National Guardsmen were federalized and organized into regiments for 100 days service in May 1864. Shipped mostly to the Eastern Theater, they were designed to be placed in "safe" rear areas to protect railroads and supply points, thereby freeing regular troops for Lt. Gen. Ulysses S. Grant’s push on the Confederate capital of Richmond, Virginia. As events transpired, many units found themselves in combat, stationed in the path of Confederate Gen. Jubal Early’s veteran Army of the Valley during its famed Valley Campaigns of 1864. Ohio Guard units met the battle-tested foe head on and helped blunt the Confederate offensive thereby saving Washington, D.C. from capture. Ohio National Guard units participated in the battles of Monacacy, Fort Stevens, Harpers Ferry, and in the siege of Petersburg.

== Casualties ==
The regiment lost 19 enlisted men during service; 11 men killed or mortally wounded, 8 men due to disease.

== Commanders ==
- Colonel Conrad Garis

== See also ==
- List of Ohio Civil War units
- Ohio in the Civil War
