= Battle of Moore's Mill =

Battle of the American Civil War

- Part of the Trans-Mississippi Theater of the American Civil War
Date	July 28, 1862
Location	Callaway County, Missouri
Result	Union victory

Belligerents
United States of America	Confederate States of America

Commanders and leaders
Odon Guitar	Joseph C. Porter

Strength
733	260–350

Casualties and losses
13 killed 55 wounded	27–202 killed and wounded

- Moore's Mill Battlefield
- U.S. National Register of Historic Places
- Location within Missouri Location within the United States
- Location: Along Auxvasse Creek, Calwood, Missouri
- Coordinates: 38.84°N 91.92°W
- NRHP reference No.: 15000196
- Added to NRHP: May 4, 2015

The Battle of Moore's Mill was an American Civil War battle that took place in Central Missouri on July 28, 1862, along Auxvasse Creek near modern-day Calwood. This engagement, the Battle of Kirksville a week later, and the Battle of Compton's Ferry would drive the main Southern recruiters from northern Missouri. The Moore's Mill Battlefield was added to the National Register of Historic Places in 2015.

== Background ==
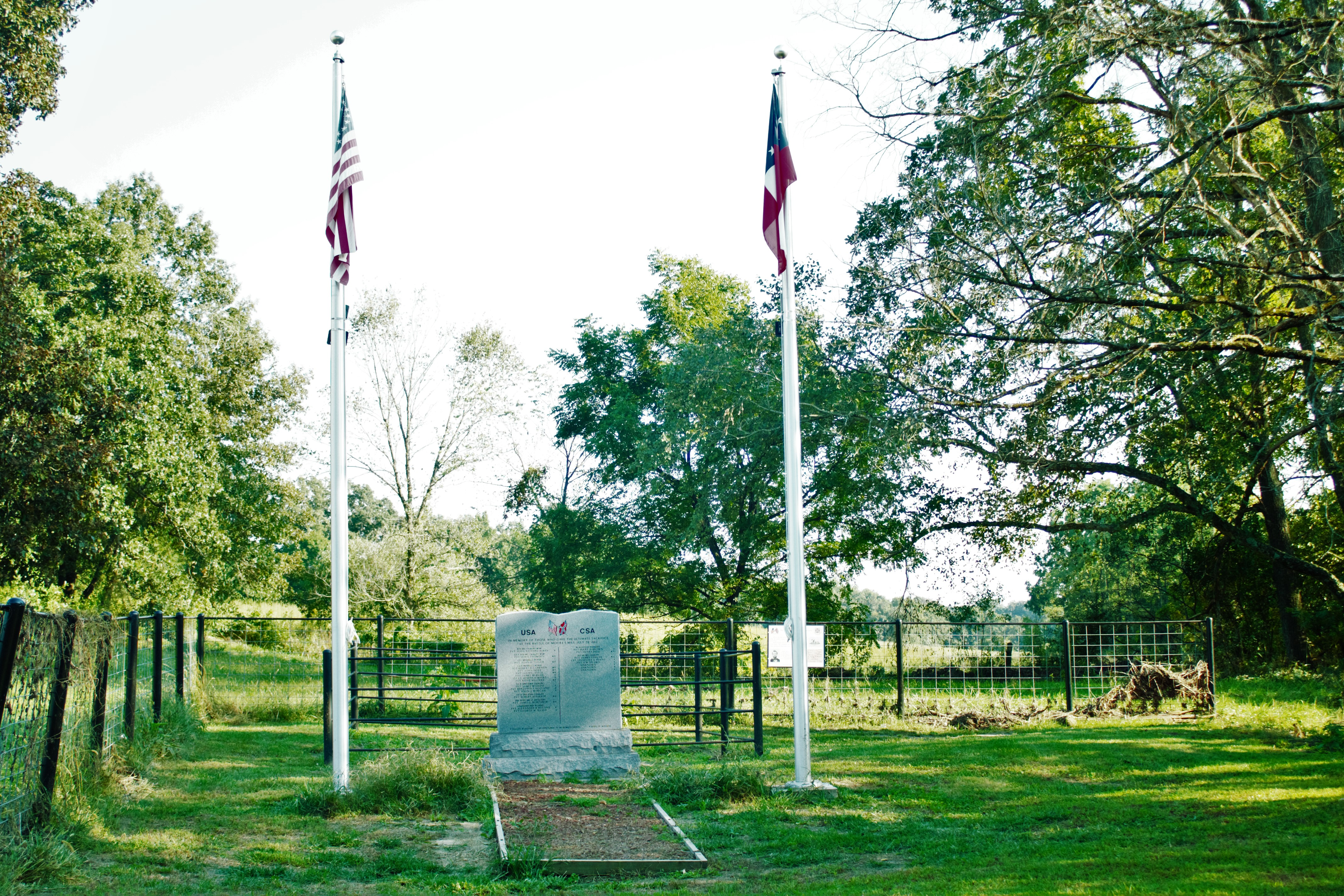
A United States of America flag and a Confederate States of America flag flank a memorial gravestone that includes a list of names of the soldiers killed at this battle site.

Following the Battle of Pea Ridge, Arkansas and the resulting Confederate withdrawal from northern Arkansas, recruiters were dispatched throughout Missouri in an attempt to rebuild the Confederate forces. Southern guerrillas aided the recruiters and often fought alongside them.

Guerrilla warfare plagued Missouri from the start of the conflict, but intensified in early 1862 as the weather warmed. To combat the growing menace, General Henry W. Halleck issued General Order Number 2 on March 13, by which Missourians were "warned that if they join any guerrilla band they will not, if captured, be treated as ordinary prisoners of war, but will be hung as robbers and murderers". Confederate President Jefferson Davis responded on April 21, 1862, attempting to legitimize guerrilla warfare by authorizing commissions for those forming bands of "partisan rangers", but this was not accepted by the United States authorities. On May 29 Brigadier General John Schofield responded with General Order No. 18 to the Missouri State Militia, which read in part:

When caught in arms, engaged in their unlawful warfare, they will be shot down upon the spot.

As guerrilla warfare and recruiting increased, and as the state had been stripped of nearly all but the new volunteer Missouri State Militia Cavalry regiments, guerrilla action and Confederate recruiting began to press Missouri harder throughout the summer. The Missouri State Militia commanders and Union Volunteers began to converge on Joseph C. Porter's recruiters and associated guerrillas, fighting small action at Vassar Hill on July 19, Florida on July 22, and Santa Fe on July 24.

Meanwhile, on July 22 General Schofield with the aid of Missouri's provisional Governor Hamilton Rowan Gamble ordered a compulsory militia enrollment, the Enrolled Missouri Militia, in an effort to raise a sufficient body of men for community defense. Schofield issued General Orders No. 19 requiring all able bodied loyal men to enroll in the militia and the disloyal to register stating their sympathies.

While these orders did raise a militia force for garrison duty and local policing that freed the Missouri State Militia for active pursuit of guerrillas and recruiters, the policies also forced those of Southern loyalties to choose sides. Thousands chose the brush, guerrilla bands, or to seek out recruiters to join the Southern army. Joseph C. Porter and John A. Poindexter's Confederate recruiting commands would immediately benefit from the order as Southern sympathizer flocked to their banners. In the meantime it would be several weeks before this newest Missouri militia would be ready to take the field.

== The Brown's Spring Skirmish ==
In Jefferson City on July 27, Colonel Odon Guitar of the 9th Missouri State Militia Cavalry (9th MSM Cavalry) received instructions to reinforce Lieutenant-Colonel Shaffer in Columbia with two companies, which he did. Guitar also received intelligence that Porter and guerrilla leader Alvin Cobb were encamped together only 11 miles north of Fulton at Brown's Spring.

Guitar selected a force of 100 men of the 9th MSM Cavalry and a section of artillery from the 3rd Indiana Battery, crossed the Missouri River and proceeded to Fulton where he was joined by 54 men of Capt. Duffield's 3rd Iowa Cavalry. With these he advanced to Brown's Spring. A small skirmish ensued nearby and Guitar found the camp recently abandoned. Learning that Lieutenant Colonel Schaeffer's had arrived nearby with 500 men, Guitar camped for the night.

== Opposing forces ==
=== Union ===
Guitar's Column

- 9th Missouri State Militia Cavalry (Cos. E, F, G, H) – Colonel Odon Guitar (~100 men)
- 3rd Indiana Battery (1 section: two 6-pounder guns) – Lt. Adolphus G. Armington (32 men)
- 3rd Iowa Cavalry (Co. E, F, G, H) – Maj. Henry C. Caldwell (133 men)

Shaffer's Column

- 2nd Missouri Cavalry "Merrill's Horse" (Cos. A, C, E, F, G, H, I, K) – Lt. Col. W.F. Shaffer (306 men)
- 10th Missouri State Militia Cavalry (Cos. B, D) – (120 men)
- Independent Cavalry Co. "Red Rovers" – Capt. Hiram A. Rice (38 men) (later Co. I, 10th MSM Cavalry)

=== Confederate ===
- 1st Northeast Missouri Cavalry – Col. Joseph C. Porter (~125 men)
- Blackfoot Rangers – Lt. John Bowles (65 men)
- Cobb's Guerrillas – Capt. Alvin Cobb (75 men)

Order of battle and strengths tabulated from text of Michael Banasik's Embattled Arkansas: The Prairie Grove Campaign of 1862.

== Battle ==
Awaiting Guitar's force were at least 260 Confederates under the overall command of Colonel Porter including the 65 Boone County men of the Blackfoot Rangers under Lieutenant John Bowles and 75 guerrillas under Captain Alvin Cobb. Rather than avoiding battle, Porter prepared an ambush along the banks of Auxvasse Creek.

On the morning of July 28 Guitar advanced along the Creek and was joined by Shaffer's much larger force for a combined force of 733 men. Guitar attempted to trap Porter by sending Shaffer east across the creek in a flanking movement with 464 men. Simultaneously Guitar advanced west of the creek with 269 men, but too rapidly for Shaffer's wing to complete their movement in time. Porter's force awaited Guitar in ambush, concealed in trees and brush adjacent to the path. The rebels unleashed two devastating volleys into the federals before they could react.

Guitar ordered his men to dismount and to take cover in the woods while bringing his cannon forward. Porter lacked artillery and the federals hoped that their artillery would soon unnerve and dislodge Porter's men. After an hour Porter declared, "Boys, we can't stand this, we shall have to charge them—Forward! Charge!" The Confederates shot down the gunners and overran at least one of the two pieces, driving the Federals back in disorder.

At this stage Shaffer's force arrived on the field having countermarched after hearing volley fire and artillery. A company surged forward retaking the guns and sending the rebels reeling back to their original positions. Shaffer's men dismounted and the exchange of fire continued.

After several hours, Porter's men were short of ammunition and the order was given to withdraw. Standing or leaving cover to withdraw exposed the men and many Confederates reported that this was when many of their casualties occurred. The exhausted Union troops did not pursue immediately and the Confederates were able to withdraw.

== Casualties ==
Federal casualties were considerable with 13 killed and 55 wounded. Confederate casualties can only be estimated. Setting the lower bound is a tabulation in the Fulton Telegraph of August 1 listing the names of those Confederates known dead, captured and wounded as well as mentioning several wounded refusing to give their names. Guitar's report of the engagement claimed to have killed 52 and wounded from 125-150, but these figures are not supported by other accounts. Participant and later author Joseph A. Mudd also quotes a contemporary Shelby County, Missouri history that said the "Confederates reported a loss of eleven killed and twenty-one severely wounded".

== Aftermath ==
Guitar's force was too exhausted from the chase and battle to pursue Porter's fleeing command. Porter's threat to Northeast Missouri would end in defeat on August 6 at the Battle of Kirksville. Porter would order his command to scatter and find their way South to the Confederate Army. Guitar became ill shortly after Moore's Mill and was unable to join in the victory at Kirksville, although some of his force was present.

Odon Guitar's efforts in this battle and his pursuit and destruction of Poindexter's force several weeks later would result in Guitar's promotion to brigadier general of Missouri State Militia. Southern recruiting efforts in the northern portion of the state would never recover.
