= Provisional Enrolled Missouri Militia =

The Provisional Enrolled Missouri Militia or PEMM also known as the Detailed Militia was a state militia organization of Missouri's Union government during the American Civil War. Unlike the Enrolled Missouri Militia it was a full-time force.

== Background ==
The Provisional Enrolled Missouri Militia was created by Missouri Governor Hamilton Rowan Gamble in 1863 when it was determined that the mixed sympathy part-time Enrolled Missouri Militia was not an effective garrison force against guerrilla activity. Reliable Unionists were selected from the EMM regiments and the enrolled militia were disbanded. The new provisional regiments were paid by the state, but were outfitted and supplied by the Federal government.

== History ==
The life of these regiments was short. They began organizing in May 1863. Several regiments were involved in opposing Shelby's 1863 Raid. Primarily they opposed guerrillas and served as local garrisons.

While the PEMM regiments were loyal, they were also composed largely of Radical Unionists opposed to Governor Gamble's Conservative Unionist administration. To prevent the Radical PEMM militia from influencing the November 1863 judicial elections the governor disbanded most of the PEMM regiments.

Like the Missouri State Militia Cavalry the PEMM soldiers would be eligible for federal pensions.
