= Battle of Roan's Tan Yard =

1862 battle of the American Civil War

Battle of Roan's Tan Yard Battle of Silver Creek
- Part of the Trans-Mississippi Theater of the American Civil War
Date	January 8, 1862
Location	Randolph County, Missouri 39.3246°N 92.5584°W
Result	Union victory

Belligerents
(United States) Union Army	Missouri State Guard

Commanders and leaders
W. M. G. Torrence	John A. Poindexter

Units involved
1st Missouri Cavalry Regiment; 2nd Missouri Cavalry Regiment; 4th Ohio Cavalry Regiment; 1st Iowa Cavalry Regiment	Missouri State Guard recruits

Strength
c. 450–500	c. 1,000

Casualties and losses
4–27	80–128

The Battle of Roan's Tan Yard, also known as the Battle of Silver Creek, was a minor battle fought during the American Civil War on January 8, 1862, in Randolph County, Missouri. After back-and-forth operations throughout 1861, the pro-Confederate Missouri State Guard under the command of Sterling Price had been confined to southwestern Missouri. In December 1861, Price authorized recruiting and raiding activities in the central portion of the state, with the North Missouri Railroad being a major target. In January 1862, Major W. M. G. Torrence of the Union Army located a Missouri State Guard base in Randolph County and attacked it on January 8 with elements of four cavalry regiments. The camp, which was commanded by Colonel John A. Poindexter, put up little resistance and was soon overrun. Large quantities of supplies were captured in the abandoned camp, which was destroyed. The action at Roan's Tan Yard, along with a Missouri State Guard defeat at the Battle of Mount Zion Church the preceding December, led to a decrease in pro-Confederate activity in central Missouri.

== Background ==
When the American Civil War began in early 1861, the state of Missouri was politically divided. Despite being a slave state, it did not secede, although Governor Claiborne Fox Jackson supported secession. An attempt by Jackson and his pro-secession followers to move against the St. Louis Arsenal was thwarted on May 10 by Brigadier General Nathaniel Lyon of the Union Army. In response, Jackson formed the Missouri State Guard as a pro-secession militia unit and appointed Sterling Price to lead it. Lyon chased Jackson and Price into the southwestern portion of the state in June, where Price was reinforced by Brigadier General Benjamin McCulloch and his Confederate States Army unit. On August 10, Lyon attacked Price's and McCulloch's combined camp, but Lyon was killed and his army routed in the Battle of Wilson's Creek. Price followed up the victory by leading the Missouri State Guard on a foray north towards the Missouri River, culminating in the capture of Lexington in September. In mid-October, Union troops concentrated against Price, who then retreated back into southwestern Missouri. On November 3, while at Neosho, Jackson and the pro-secession state legislators, who had previously been evicted from the state capital by Lyon, voted to secede and join the Confederate State of America as a government-in-exile; the anti-secession elements of the state legislature had previously voted to remain in the United States.

== Battle ==
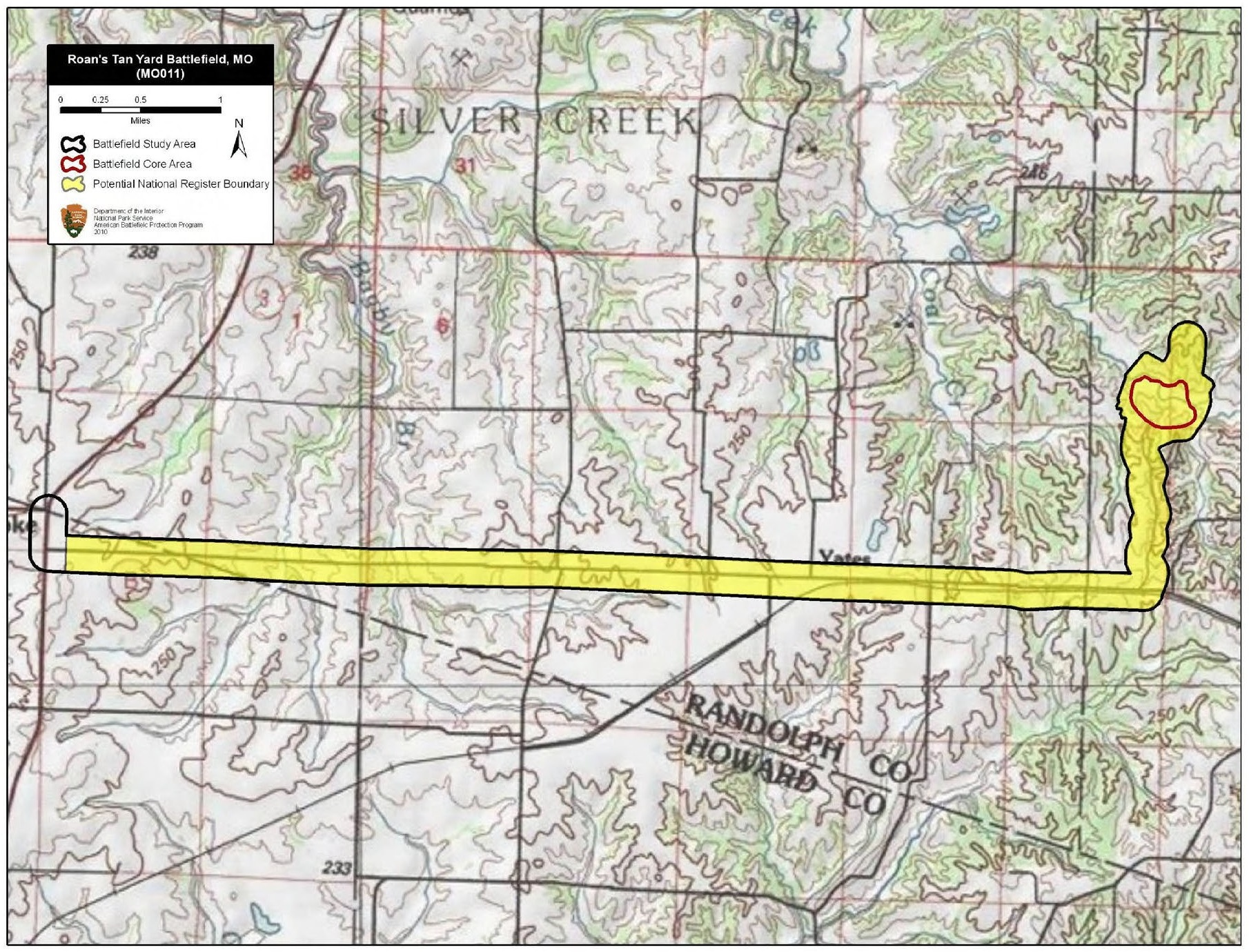
Map of the Roan's Tan Yard battlefield

In December, Price sent recruiters into the central portions of Missouri, in the hope that men would volunteer to serve in his command. An additional goal was to raid the North Missouri Railroad on the night of December 20. Several hundred men volunteered for the raid on the railroad, and damaged a 100 miles (160 km) stretch of it by burning bridges; thousands of Missourians joined Confederate-supporting units in the period after the raid. The Missouri State Guard then formed a camp in the vicinity of Yates, Missouri, in Randolph County, to attract and train new recruits. While scouting near Silver Creek in January 1862, Union major, W. M. G. Torrence, of the 1st Iowa Cavalry Regiment, learned of the presence of a Missouri State Guard camp in the area. While Union authorities had been aware of the existence of the camp for over a week, its location had not previously been established. The Missouri State Guard outpost was under the command of Colonel John A. Poindexter. An 1864 source estimated that Poindexter had around 1,000 men on hand.

On January 8, Torrence decided to attack Poindexter's camp. Collecting together detachments from his own regiment, as well as the 1st and 2nd Missouri and the 4th Ohio cavalry regiments, Torrence began preparing for an attack. The National Park Service estimates the Union column's strength at around 450 men, while a 1908 history of the Union Army gives a strength of about 500. One soldier recalled that the day was "Very foggy and quite warm." About 4 miles (6 km) from the Missouri State Guard camp, Torrence deployed his men. One battalion of the 2nd Missouri Cavalry and one company of the 4th Ohio Cavalry were to draw Poindexter's fire, while elements of the 1st Iowa Cavalry and the 1st Missouri Cavalry were to conduct a mounted charge; three additional companies of the 2nd Missouri Cavalry were to attack from a different direction. The attack hit around 16:30 with fog on the field. Initially, the Missouri State Guardsmen held out, using the fog and the terrain as cover, with the two sides trading volleys. Torrence broke the stalemate by sending four companies, three of which were from the 1st Iowa Cavalry, to charge Poindexter's line. This threw the defenders into confusion, and the camp was captured after a fight of only thirty or forty minutes. Soon after the Confederates started to flee, the Union followed them, crossing knee deep through the creek and firing upon them on a hill west of the camp. Large quantities of supplies and equipment were taken from the camp; Union forces destroyed much of Poindexter's camp equipage and also captured horses. Poindexter's surviving men fled, using fog to cover their retreat. In his official report, Torrence stated that he had sent two companies to block the Missouri State Guardsmen's path of retreat, but that fog and the terrain thwarted the attempt, allowing their escape.

== Aftermath ==
After the battle, the camp was destroyed; with the camp unusable, Missouri State Guard recruiting activities in Randolph County ceased. Coupled with another defeat, at the Battle of Mount Zion Church, the previous December, the setback led to a reduction of pro-Confederate activities in the central Missouri region. Estimates of casualties suffered in the action vary. Torrence estimated that between 80 and 100 Missouri State Guard soldiers were killed or wounded, and reported the capture of a further 28; the National Park Service and the modern history Frances H. Kennedy place Poindexter's loss at a total of 80. Union casualties are generally reported to have been either four or 11, although one source places their loss at as high as 27. The site of the battle is privately owned and is not commemorated on-site, although a museum in nearby Huntsville provides interpretation of the action. A 2011 study by the Civil War Sites Advisory Commission determined that 1,329.25 acres (537.93 ha) of the battlefield are likely eligible to be listed on the National Register of Historic Places. The same study determined that land use at the site was relatively unchanged when compared to the time of the battle.

== General sources ==
- Bishop, John Soast (1864). A Concise History of the War: Designed to Accompany Perrine's New Topographical War Map of the Southern States, with an Introduction and Statistical Appendix, Comp. from Authentic Sources. Indianapolis, Indiana: C. O. Perrine & Company. OCLC 7843460.
- Hatcher, Richard (1998). "Wilson's Creek, Missouri". In Kennedy, Frances H. (ed.). The Civil War Battlefield Guide (2nd ed.). Boston/New York: Houghton Mifflin. ISBN 978-0-395-74012-5.
- Jaques, Tony (2007). Dictionary of Battles and Sieges: A Guide to 8,500 Battles from Antiquity through the Twenty-first Century. Vol. 3. Westport, Connecticut: Greenwood Press. ISBN 9780313335396.
- Kennedy, Frances H., ed. (1998). The Civil War Battlefield Guide (2nd ed.). Boston/New York: Houghton Mifflin. ISBN 978-0-395-74012-5.
- Lothrop, Charles H. (1890). A History of the First Regiment Iowa Cavalry Veteran Volunteers. Lyons, Iowa: Beers & Eaton. OCLC 4423979.
- The Union Army: Cyclopedia of Battles. Vol. VI (Helena Road to Z). Madison, Wisconsin: Federal Publishing Company. 1908. OCLC 694018100.
- The War of the Rebellion: A Compilation of the Official Records of the Union and Confederate Armies. Vol. 8. Washington, D.C.: United States Government Printing Office. 1883. OCLC 262466842.
- "Update to the Civil War Sites Advisory Commission Report on the Nation's Civil War Battlefields: State of Missouri" (PDF). Washington, D.C.: American Battlefield Protection Program. March 2011.
- Weeks, Michael (2009). The Complete Civil War Road Trip Guide. Woodstock, Vermont: The Countryman Press. ISBN 978-0-88150-860-4.
