= Skirmish at Blackwater Creek =

Battle of the American Civil War

Coordinates: 38.866°N 93.623°W

- Part of the Trans-Mississippi Theater of the American Civil War
| Date | December 19, 1861 |
| Location | Johnson County, Missouri |
| Result | Union victory |

Belligerents
| United States of America | Missouri State Guard |

Commanders and leaders
| John Pope | Franklin S. Robertson |

Strength
| ~2,000 of the 1st Brigade (engaged); ~2,000 of 2nd Brigade (unengaged) | 750+ Robertson's MSG Recruit Regiment |

Casualties and losses
| 2 killed 8 wounded | 684+ captured killed and wounded unknown |

The Skirmish at Blackwater Creek, also known as the Skirmish at Milford, was an American Civil War skirmish that took place in central Missouri on December 19, 1861, near present-day Valley City. It was a victory for the North.

== Background ==
Following the Siege of Lexington, Missouri the secessionist Missouri State Guard withdrew to the southwest portion of Missouri. Some Southern recruiters such as Colonel Franklin S. Robertson remained, attempting to fill their regiments. Robertson, a store owner in Saline County, Missouri born in Kentucky had been granted his commission by Major General Sterling Price at Lexington.

Meanwhile, Union Brigadier General John Pope, in command of the District of Central Missouri, was determined to suppress Southern recruiting in the region. He headed Southwest from Sedalia before turning the main body north toward Warrensburg.

Robertson collected his recruits at Grand Pass where they elected officers. On December 16, 1861, the 750 men began their March south. The plan was to first link up with Colonel J.J. Clarkson's recruits near Warrensburg, Missouri before proceeding south to General Price. They were unable to merge with Clarkson but they were joined by Colonel Ebenezer Magoffin, who was on parole after being captured while attempting to recruit his own regiment. Magoffin is notable as the brother of Kentucky Governor Beriah Magoffin.

General Pope learned on the evening of December 18 that Robertson's force would be camped at Milford.

== The battle ==
Early the next morning Pope's force marched toward Knob Noster, Missouri. Pope ordered Colonel Jefferson C. Davis's brigade to the Blackwater bridge where he was to force the bridge. Simultaneously a battalion of the 2nd Missouri Cavalry ("Merrill's Horse") moved northeast to complete the envelopment.

Realizing his guardsmen were in a precarious position, Robertson formed a firing line of approximately 250 men while Colonel Magoffin was detailed with several dozen men to take possession of the bridge before the Federals arrived.

It was insufficient. Colonel Davis ordered three companies of the 4th U.S. Cavalry forward under Lieutenant Charles Copley Amory, with the 1st Iowa Cavalry in support. Amory dismounted his men and gave two volleys to the bridge's defenders causing them to waver. Amory ordered a charge and the defenders fled. The now mounted force pursued, encountering some casualties as they made contact with the second line. They held their positions as the infantry came up and the envelopment was completed. Robertson's men recognized their predicament and requested a brief truce before surrendering.

== Casualties ==
Federal casualties were exceedingly light, two killed and eight wounded. General Pope claimed the capture of "1,300 men…three colonels (Robinson, Alexander, and Magoffin)…one lieutenant-colonel (Robinson), one major (Harris), and 51 commissioned company officers" and "About 500 horses and mules, 73 wagons heavily loaded with powder, lead, tents, subsistence stores, and supplies of various kinds…also 1,000 stand of arms." However, this appears to be overstated as records indicate "684 guardsmen and several civilians" eventually reached prison.

== Aftermath ==
The engagement resulted in the capture of a full, newly recruited Missouri State Guard regiment, hampering future Confederate recruiting in the region.

John Pope would have another major triumph at the Battle of Island Number Ten where he would capture ~4,500 Confederates (while claiming 7,000.) Lincoln would appoint him commander of the Union Army of Virginia, in command of which he would suffer a crushing defeat at Second Manassas.

Franklin Robertson's military career did not recover, and he re-entered service as a captain after exchange at Vicksburg in the summer of 1862.

== Other notables captured ==
Among the 684 known prisoners marched to Sedalia and carried by rail to St. Louis were several other notables: Ebenezer Magoffin, William Goff Caples, and Bartholomew W. Keown. All three would die before the close of the war.

Of national interest a Missouri military tribunal convicted Ebenezer Magoffin of violating his parole and sentenced him to be executed. Lincoln, sensitive to Kentucky politics (Being a native of that state), intervened on his behalf requesting a review. Before any final disposition could be made, Magoffin and several dozen inmates tunneled out of Alton Prison and escaped. He was killed near the end of the war while intervening in a bar fight in southern Arkansas.

The other two were of more interest to Missourians. William Goff Caples was a fiery secessionist minister and president of the Missouri Conference of the Methodist Episcopal Church South. After six weeks confinement he gave his oath and eventually moderated his politics. He even became supervisor of the telegraph guard for a stretch near Glasgow. In an ironic twist he was killed there by an artillery shell from Jo Shelby's bombardment on October 15, of 1864.

Bartholomew W. Keown (also referred to as Keon or McKeown) was a South Carolinian who had become sheriff of Benton County, Missouri. It was alleged that in this capacity he obtained detailed information about the Benton County Home Guard (Unionist) regiment and relayed it to secessionist militia in Warsaw who launched a successful attack, the Battle of Cole Camp (1861). He died of disease in Alton Prison before he could be tried.
