= 168th New York Infantry Regiment =

- Active: September 18, 1862 – October 31, 1863
- Country: United States
- Allegiance: Union
- Branch: Infantry
- Engagements: Dix's Peninsula Campaign

The 168th New York Infantry Regiment (a.k.a. "19th State Militia") was an infantry regiment in the Union Army during the American Civil War.

== Service ==
The 168th New York Infantry was organized at Newburgh, New York, beginning August 22, 1862, and mustered in February 11, 1863, for nine months' service under the command of Colonel William R. Brown.

The regiment was attached to Busteed's Independent Brigade, IV Corps, Department of Virginia, to April 1863. King's Independent Brigade, IV Corps, to June 1863. 3rd Brigade, 1st Division, IV Corps, to July 1863. 2nd Brigade, 2nd Division, XI Corps, Army of the Potomac, to October 1863.

The 168th New York Infantry mustered out on October 31, 1863.

== Detailed service ==
The regiment left New York for Baltimore, Maryland, on February 12, 1863 then moved to Norfolk, Virginia, Garrison duty at Yorktown, Virginia, until June 1863. They participated in Dix's Peninsula Campaign from June 24 until July 7. The regiment was ordered to Washington, D.C., on July 9 then to Funkstown, Maryland. It joined the Army of the Potomac at Hagerstown, Maryland on July 14. The regiment took part in the pursuit of Robert E. Lee to Manassas Gap, Virginia, from July 14 to July 24. They then assumed guard duty along the Orange and Alexandria Railroad until October.

== Casualties ==
The regiment lost a total of 38 men during service; one enlisted man killed, one officer and 36 enlisted men died of disease.

== Commanders ==
- Colonel William R. Brown

== See also ==
- List of New York Civil War regiments
- New York in the Civil War
