= John A. Poindexter =

- Born: October 12, 1825; Montgomery County, Kentucky, US
- Died: April 14, 1869 (aged 43); Randolph County, Missouri, US
- Burial place: Antioch Cemetery, near Moberly, Missouri
- Military career
- Allegiance: Confederate States of America
- Branch: Confederate States Army
- Service years: 1861–1862
- Rank: Colonel
- Conflicts: American Civil War; Siege of Lexington; Battle of Roan's Tan Yard; Battle of Pea Ridge; Battle of Compton's Ferry; Battle of Yellow Creek

John A. Poindexter (October 12, 1825 – April 14, 1869) was a colonel in the Confederate Army during the American Civil War. He and Joseph C. Porter were the primary recruiting commanders in northern Missouri during 1862.

== Early life and career ==
Poindexter was born in Montgomery County, Kentucky, to David and Elizabeth (Watts) Poindexter. He married in Kentucky to Melissa Lucas, who died a few years after the birth of their daughter Mary E. Poindexter (1849–1935). He married again in 1857 to Martha K. "Mattie" Hayes (b. about 1840). The 1860 census lists him as a prosperous merchant in Scott County, Kentucky.

== Descendants ==
Following the war, his sons Thomas A. Poindexter (1867–1936) and Smith A. Poindexter (1868–1953) were born. Following his death on 14 April 1869, his daughter Mary E. Poindexter married on 12 September 1869 to Andrew J. Hayes (Sep 1846 - 22 Sep 1931), son of Samuel A. Hayes and Jane W. Cloyd.

== Civil War ==
Living in Missouri when the Civil War, Poindexter was commissioned in June 1861 as captain of Company A, 1st Cavalry Regiment, 3rd Division of the Missouri State Guard. He and his men stopped a train in August, seizing federal money. He served at the Siege of Lexington in command of several independent companies. Following the battle he was elected colonel of the 5th Infantry Regiment, Third Division of the Missouri State Guard on September 24, 1861. While recruiting in Howard County, Missouri, Poindexter and his regiment were surprised and defeated on January 7, 1862, at the Battle of Roan's Tan Yard, scattering his command.

Poindexter commanded of a consolidated remnant of the 4th and 5th Cavalry regiments of the Missouri State Guard at the Battle of Pea Ridge, where he was slightly wounded. Following the Confederate defeat, Poindexter resumed recruiting in North Missouri, while Porter recruited in Northeastern Missouri. Poindexter gained recruits, but thereafter was not very successful. After Odon Guitar struck a blow against Porter at Moore's Mill, he turned his attention to Poindexter. In August, Guitar's forces overran and completely scattered Poindexter's green recruits at the Battle of Compton's Ferry and a subsequent fight at the Battle of Yellow Creek. Seriously wounded, Poindexter was captured on September 1. He would never again serve the Confederacy.

== Post-capture and death ==
Following his capture, Poindexter was held while Union authorities considered trying and executing him as a guerrilla either by military tribunal or in a civilian court.

SAINT LOUIS, MO., September 9, 1862.

Brig. Gen. LEWIS MERRILL: I think Poindexter had better be tried by military commission. I believe I can secure the execution of a sentence. J. M. SCHOFIELD, Brigadier-General.

Trans-Mississippi commander Thomas C. Hindman attempted to intervene pointing out that Poindexter was a CSA officer. James Totten replied:

I understand the facts to be that when arrested he was in citizen's garb, at a private house, and within our lines. If so, he is by the laws of war a spy and should be treated accordingly.

However, Poindexter eventually publicly disavowed guerrilla warfare and was paroled to his home for the remainder of the war under a bond of $10,000.

HEADQUARTERS DEPARTMENT OF THE MISSOURI,

Saint Louis, Mo., June 15, 1864. General FISK, Saint Joseph, Mo.: I have seen Poindexter, of Randolph, who is under bonds, and written him a note to use his influence in favor of law and order among the rebel sympathizers. Keep the secret and give needful orders to secure him from molestation or outrage. He will do good. W. S. ROSECRANS, Major-General.

During August 1864, Poindexter was forced to leave his home fearing both the wrath of Unionists who considered him a bushwacker and Southern sympathizers who considered him a traitor. He sought the protection of Union authorities from both threats.

His health never recovered from his earlier wounds and imprisonment and he died April 14, 1869. He is interred at Antioch Cemetery near Moberly, Missouri.
