= Battle of Compton's Ferry =

Battle of the American Civil War

Coordinates: 39°44′36″N 93°37′39″W

- Part of the Trans-Mississippi Theater of the American Civil War
Date	August 11, 1862
Location	Grand River, Carroll County, Missouri
Result	Union victory

Belligerents
United States (Union)	(Confederate States of America) CSA (Confederacy)

Commanders and leaders
Odon Guitar	John A. Poindexter

Strength
550	1,200–1,500

Casualties and losses
None reported	

The Battle of Compton's Ferry, also known as Little Compton Ferry, was an action during the American Civil War, occurring along the Grand River in Carroll County, Missouri. The battle lasted from August 10 to August 13, 1862. Switzler, writing in 1881, correctly identifies the location as Carroll County, not Livingston County: "Continuing the pursuit, he overtook Porter at 9 o'clock on Monday night, at Compton's Ferry on Grand River in Carroll County."

== Battle ==
Colonel John A. Poindexter and his force of 1200 to 1500 Confederate recruits were caught at Compton Ferry along the Grand River by forces under Union Col. Odon Guitar. In seven days, Guitar's forces pursued Poindexter's for 250 miles and attacked the guerrilla forces three times. They were confronted at Switzler's mill, Little Compton (Compton's Ferry), and on the Muscle Fork of the Chariton River. Here the Federals caught the rebels in the act of crossing the river, causing great havoc and sending them into headlong retreat. Two Union artillery pieces fired a total of eight rounds producing the rout. A large amount of materiel was recovered.

During the battle, 150 Confederate soldiers were wounded, killed, or drowned. Another 100 soldiers were taken prisoner. The Union forces fared much better, with only 5 men being wounded and 10 horses being killed. Guitar's forces numbered 550.

Accounts of the battle were gruesome. As soldiers attempted to escape, many discarded their guns and plunged with their horses into the river. Some of the horses were able to return to shore, but many drowned. A number of soldiers with their baggage, horses, mules, guns, and wagons were captured.

The converging Union forces of Guitar and Benjamin Loan continued to pursue Poindexter's men immediately after this action, dealing them a crippling blow at the Battle of Yellow Creek. The wounded Colonel Poindexter was captured September 1 wearing civilian clothing.

== Aftermath ==
The result of this battle and the subsequent battle at Yellow Creek was the effective suppression of Confederate recruiting efforts and major guerrilla operations north of the Missouri River in the northwest portion of the state.

Following the battles at Compton's Ferry, Yellow Creek, and other sites, Governor Gamble promoted Colonel Guitar to Brigadier-General of Enrolled Missouri Militia.
