= Missouri State Militia (Union) =

The Missouri State Militia was a federally funded state militia organization of Missouri conceived in 1861 and beginning service in 1862 during the American Civil War. It was a full-time force whose primary purpose was to conduct offensive operations against Confederate guerrillas and recruiters as well as oppose raids by regular Confederate forces. The militia at one time numbered more than 13,000 soldiers, but this force was reduced to 10,000 soldiers, by the United States government.

== Background ==
Original Missouri state militia (pre-Missouri State Guard)
Prior to the Civil War, Missouri had a system of state-regulated local militia companies organized as the official Missouri Volunteer Militia (MVM), that could be called up by the governor for emergencies or annual drill. During the secession crisis Missouri Governor Claiborne Jackson used the MVM covertly as secessionist tool until the majority of its members in eastern Missouri, and almost all the state's arms, were captured during the Camp Jackson Affair in St. Louis. The events in St. Louis prompted the Missouri legislature to pass Governor Jackson's "Military Bill" reorganizing the state militia into the Missouri State Guard.

Home Guard
In Missouri at the beginning of the Civil War, volunteer Unionist Home Guard regiments were formed with the support of Federal authorities to oppose secessionist Governor Claiborne Jackson's efforts at organizing secessionist strength, and his efforts to prevent Missouri enlistments into Federal service. Brigadier General Nathaniel Lyon was given authority by the War Department to organize the Home Guard units throughout Missouri on June 11, 1861.

Six-month militia
By late 1861 most of the Home Guard regiments had been disbanded. They were replaced by a smaller Six-month militia under state rather than Federal control. This force was too expensive for the cash-strapped Provisional Government of Missouri to maintain. It was also too small to be effective. In all five regiments, eleven battalions, and ten companies were formed as six-month militia. (Although the financial burden for this organization during the war was paid by Missouri, the state was finally reimbursed following the United States Congress April 17, 1866 passage of "An act to reimburse the State of Missouri for moneys expended for the United States in enrolling, equipping, and provisioning militia forces to aid in suppressing the rebellion."

== Creation ==
On November 6, 1861 Provisional Missouri Governor Hamilton Rowan Gamble reached an agreement with Abraham Lincoln to form a new full-time state militia equipped and financed by the United States but under control of the Missouri governor with officers appointed by him. The new Missouri State Militia would cooperate with Federal commanders but would not be subject to service outside the state except when necessary to directly defend it. The Six-month militia was disbanded by General Order No. 2 of the Missouri Adjutant General on January 14 and effective January 25, 1862.

The new Missouri State Militia (MSM) was primarily a mounted force active throughout the remainder of the war. Cavalry were necessary to pursue and confront fast moving mounted guerrillas, recruiters, and raiders. By April 1862 the Missouri State Militia consisted of fourteen cavalry regiments, three cavalry battalions, two light artillery batteries, an infantry regiment and several independent companies of various types. On February 13, 1862 however, the United States Congress limited the size of the force to 10,000 in an effort to control expenses. The exigencies of war produced delay by the Federal War Department in complying with this law—primarily through attrition. Eventually the militia would be reorganized into nine regiments of cavalry and one of infantry. This was accomplished through General Order Number 5 by the Missouri Adjutant General which broke up the 3rd and 12th Missouri State Militia Cavalry regiments and distributed them among other regiments. The 5th Missouri State Militia Cavalry was mustered out. The 2nd Battalion Missouri State Militia was also disbanded and the 11th regiment and 1st battalion had been consolidated within the 2nd Missouri State Militia Cavalry earlier.

== History ==
As the Missouri State Militia began organizing and training in early 1862, the warming weather also increased guerrilla activity. Confederate recruiters infiltrated the state and began organizing new commands to be sent south. This accelerated the learning curve for the new militia cavalry. Despite setbacks and a surge in Confederate activity even north of the Missouri River, the militia cavalry proved to be an effective offensive force in confronting guerrillas, recruiters, and raiders within the state during the Summer of 1862. By Fall the recruiters had been driven from the state. Although guerrilla activity would remain a constant nuisance in much of the state, and raids would continue south of the Missouri River, the militia cavalry established Federal control of Missouri throughout the remainder of the war.

There were three unusual aspects of the militia cavalry compared to conventional cavalry. The first was the frequent integration of light artillery into regimental or battalion level actions. The additional firepower was often effective against guerrillas or raiders with no artillery of their own. The second was that cavalry soldiers were required to provide their own horses, and were paid for this periodically. Thirdly, the militia served primarily in their own state, aside from limited periods in Arkansas and Kansas.

There was considerable controversy surrounding the actions and officers of men of the Missouri State Militia Cavalry. Several officers were charged with inefficiency or worse during operations, particularly during Sterling Price's 1864 Raid. General Alfred Pleasonton relieved General Egbert Brown and John McNeil for "failure to obey an order to attack." Also relieved by Pleasonton in the same action was Colonel James McFerran of the 1st Missouri State Militia Cavalry "whose regiment was straggling all over the country, and he was neglecting to prevent it." Colonel Henry S. Lipscomb of the 11th Missouri State Militia Cavalry was relieved for not pursuing Joseph C. Porter more vigorously during the summer of 1862 and the regiment was consolidated with the 2nd. An entire regiment (the 5th Regiment (Old) was disbanded and replaced by the 5th Regiment (New), due to their lack of discipline.

With Confederate General Sterling Price openly supporting guerrilla activity in Missouri, on March 13, 1862, the Union head of the Department of the Missouri, Henry Halleck, issued orders stating that such activity was "contrary to the laws of war" and directing that such combatants "will be hung as robbers and murderers." The following month, Confederate President Jefferson Davis legitimized guerrilla warfare by authorizing bands of "partisan rangers" to be formed to operate behind Federal lines. As the primary force to confront such activity in Missouri, the Missouri State Militia hierarchy shortly afterwards issued a controversial order declaring the partisans to be "robbers and assassins" and directing that they "be shot down on the spot." The order further offered the partisans an out, stating that they would be spared should they surrender to Federal authorities and take an oath of allegiance and be placed on parole. Some militia commanders were afterwards accused of atrocities in carrying out the counter-guerrilla tactics, including conducting drum-head courts martial, or sometimes no court martial at all then executing suspected guerrillas or Southerners who had violated their paroles. There were also examples of execution of prisoners in retaliation for the deaths of Union/militia soldiers or citizens. (See the Palmyra Massacre for a notorious example.)

In contrast to these controversies, Governor Hamilton R. Gamble, praised the Missouri State Militia as "very efficient." In speaking of the Missouri State Militia, General John M. Schofield claimed that "these troops will compare favorably with any volunteer troops I have seen," specifically complimenting the Missouri State Militia in regard to drill, discipline and efficiency. Schofield subsequently became General-in-Chief of the United States Army after the war.

Militia cavalry units participated in most of the significant engagements in Missouri from 1862 to 1864. They were eligible for re-enlistment and, unusually for militia, were eligible for Federal pensions. The Missouri State Militia participated in the Battle of Westport, one of the largest battles west of the Mississippi, and the Battle of Mine Creek, the largest cavalry battle west of the Mississippi river, involving approximately 10,000 troops.

In 1864, a large number of soldiers in the Missouri State Militia were recruited to US cavalry regiments, with bonuses given for their enlistment. This greatly reduced the number of soldiers in the ranks, from 9809 in January 1864 to 8000 in November 1864.

On June 23, 1865, orders were given that all remaining troops and officers of the Missouri State Militia would be mustered out.

Regiment	2 Jul 1862	1 Dec 1862	1 Jan 1864	1 Jan 1865
1st M.S.M. Infantry	770	795	748	503
1st M.S.M. Cavalry	920	883	1013	860
2nd M.S.M. Cavalry	670	1080	959	640
3rd M.S.M. Cavalry	895	733	919	801
4th M.S.M. Cavalry	770	667	998	836
5th M.S.M. Cavalry	830	759	1105	747
6th M.S.M. Cavalry	710	619	1016	657
7th M.S.M. Cavalry	675	630	950	833
8th M.S.M. Cavalry	874	827	1148	1003
9th M.S.M. Cavalry	670	659	953	867
10th M.S.M. Cavalry	710	753		
11th M.S.M. Cavalry	620			
12th M.S.M. Cavalry	651	640		
13th M.S.M. Cavalry	692	651		
14th M.S.M. Cavalry	696	675		
1st M.S.M. Battery		80		
2nd M.S.M. Battery		89		

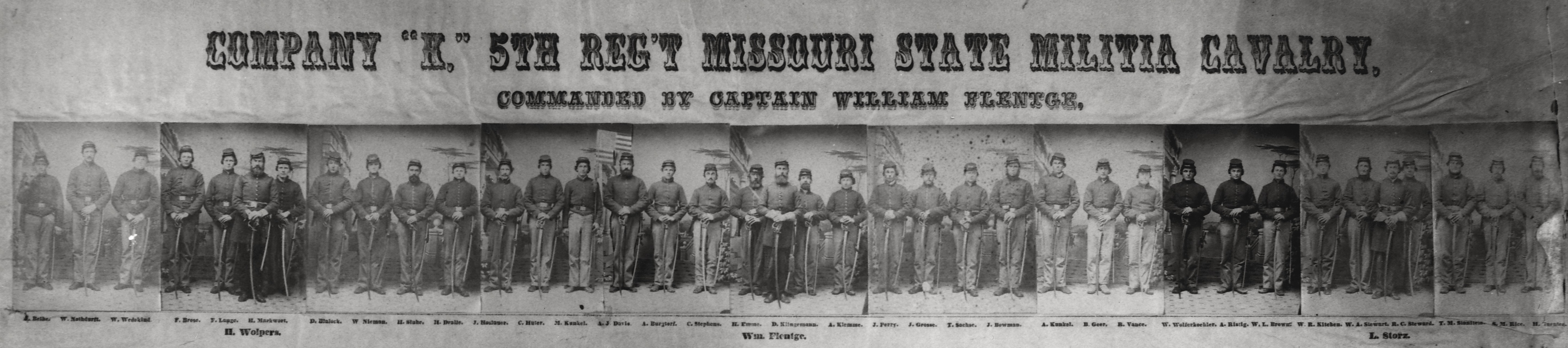
Co. K, 5th Regiment Missouri State Militia Cavalry (Union)

=== History of specific units ===
Regiments of the Missouri State Militia mustered out on different dates. Some regiments were also consolidated or transferred to other regiments. The 5th (old) Regiment was disbanded.

==== 1st Regiment Infantry, MSM ====
Mustered out April and May, 1865. 7 enlisted men were mortally wounded. 58 enlisted men died of disease. 172 deserted and 31 officers and 494 enlisted men were honorably discharged. 125 were discharged for disabilities, 3 officers were dismissed, 2 were cashiered, and 16 resigned. There were 3 accidental deaths, 27 missing in action, 13 dishonorably discharged, 3 drowned, and 5 discharged for being under age.

==== 1st Regiment Cavalry, MSM ====
Was organized at large in Missouri, 3 Feb. to 8 April 1862. Served in:
Apr 1862 - District of Central Mo.
Jul 1863 - District of the Border
Jan 1864 - District of Central Mo.
Mustered out March and April, 1865

1 officer and 65 enlisted men were killed or mortally wounded. 3 officers and 59 enlisted men died of disease. 70 deserted, 37 officers and 798 enlisted men were honorably discharged, 368 were discharged for disabilities, 5 officers were dismissed, and 22 resigned (some to join the 12th, 13th and 14th Missouri Cavalry Regiments). There were 4 accidental deaths, none missing in action, 14 dishonorably discharged, 4 dropped from the rolls, 1 drowned, 1 discharged, being minor, 1 killed by sunstroke.

==== 2d (old) Regiment Cavalry, MSM ====
1st and 2d consolidated September 2, 1862

==== 2d (new) Regiment Cavalry, MSM ====
Feb 1862 - District of Northern Mo.
Mar 1863 - District of St. Louis
Jun 1863 - District of S. E. Mo.
Jul 1863 - District of St. Louis
Mustered out March and April, 1865

14 enlisted men were killed or mortally wounded. 1 officer and 72 enlisted men died of disease. 78 deserted, 50 officers and 752 enlisted men were honorably discharged, 288 were discharged for disabilities, 33 officers resigned (some to join the 12th, 13th and 14th Missouri Cavalry Regiments). There were no accidental deaths, 1 missing in action, 6 dishonorably discharged.

==== 3d (old) Regiment Cavalry, MSM ====
Organized at Louisiana, Pike Co, May 1862
Jun 1862 - District of SW Mo.
Dec 1862 - District of Central Mo.
4 Feb 1863 - Disbanded

Companies A, B, C, D and E transferred to 6th Regiment Cavalry, MSM. Companies F, G, H, I, K transferred to 7th Regiment Cavalry, MSM. 4 February 1863.
4 enlisted men were killed or mortally wounded. 3 officers and 49 enlisted men died of disease. 13 deserted, 12 officers were honorably discharged, 51 enlisted men were discharged for disabilities, and 13 officers resigned.

There were 2 accidental deaths, and 4 dropped from the rolls.

==== 3d (new) Regiment Cavalry, MSM (formerly 10th Cavalry MSM) ====
2 Feb 1863 - Organized from 10th M.S.M.
Mar 1863 - District of St. Louis
Jun 1863 - District of SE Mo.
Jul 1863 - District of St. Louis
Mustered out January 31 and March 13, 1865. 4 officers and 50 enlisted men were killed or mortally wounded. 93 enlisted men died of disease. 164 deserted, 35 officers and 511 enlisted men were honorably discharged, 179 were discharged for disabilities, 4 officers were dismissed, and 18 officers resigned (some to join the 12th, 13th and 14th Missouri Cavalry Regiments).

There were no accidental deaths, 2 missing in action, 2 dishonorably discharged, 1 dropped from the rolls, 1 drowned.

==== 4th Regiment Cavalry, MSM ====
28 Jan to 14 May 1862 - Organized at St. Joseph, Mo.
Jun 1862 - District SW Mo.
Dec 1862 - District of Central Mo.
Jul 1863 - District of the Border
Jan 1864 - District of Central Mo
Mustered out March and April, 1865

4 officers and 29 enlisted men were killed or mortally wounded. 2 officers and 53 enlisted men died of disease. 74 deserted, 34 officers and 765 enlisted men were honorably discharged, 213 were discharged for disabilities, 4 officers were dismissed, and 35 officers resigned (some to join the 12th, 13th and 14th Missouri Cavalry Regiments).

There was 1 accidental death, none missing in action, 10 dishonorably discharged, 3 drowned, 1 discharged, being minor, and 3 discharged, over age.

==== 5th (old) Regiment Cavalry, MSM ====
Mar-Apr 1862 - Organized at St. Joseph, Mo.
District Central Mo
22 June 1863 - Mustered out

21 enlisted men were killed or mortally wounded. 1 officer and 33 enlisted men died of disease. 53 deserted, 40 officers and 634 enlisted men were honorably discharged, 136 were discharged for disabilities, and 7 officers resigned.

There were 2 accidental deaths, 6 missing in action, 4 dishonorably discharged, 1 drowned, and 3 discharged, being minors.

==== 5th Regiment Missouri State Militia Cavalry (2nd Organization) (formerly 13th Regiment MSM) ====
2 Feb 1863 - Organized from 13th MSM Cavalry, and companies C, D, E, F and G of the 12th MSM Cavalry
Feb 1863 - District of Rolla
Oct 1863 - District of Rolla
Mustered out March and April, 1865

19 enlisted men were killed or mortally wounded. 2 officers and 93 enlisted men died of disease. 98 deserted, 40 officers and 797 enlisted men were honorably discharged, 178 were discharged for disabilities, 5 officers were dismissed, and 22 officers resigned (some to join the 12th, 13th and 14th Missouri Cavalry Regiments).

There was 1 accidental death, 8 missing in action, 8 dishonorably discharged, 1 discharged, being minor, and 6 rejected by medical officer.

===== Service =====
Independence, Mo., February 8, 1863 (Cos. "C," "D," "F"). Blue springs March 22. Independence March 23. Headquarters at Waynesville. Scouts from Waynesville June 20–23 (Co. "H"). Scout from Salem and skirmish July 3 (Co. "D"). Scout from Houston to Spring River Mills and Skirmish August 6–11 (Cos. "B," "C," F" and "G"). Jack's Ford August 14 (Detachment). Warrensville August 25 (Detachment). Texas County September 11–12 (Detachment). Near Houston September 12 (Detachment). Near Salem September 13 (Cos. "C," "M"). Near Man's Creek October 14 (Detachment). King's House, near Waynesville. October 26 (Co. H). Scout from Houston to Jack's Fork November 4–6 (Cos. "B," G," "I"). Scouts from Houston November 23–29 (Detachment), and December 9–19, Scouts from Salem December 26–29 (Cos. "C," "M"). Scout from Houston into Arkansas, with skirmishes February 5–17, 1864 (Detachment). Independence April 23. Scouts from Big Piney July 5–6. Scout in Shannon County July 18–21 (Detachment). Rolla August 1. Scouts in Moniteau and Morgan Counties September 11–18 (Detachment). Scout in Texas County September 14–21 (Detachment). Thomasville September 18. Waynesville September 30 (Co. "B"). Moreau Bottom, Jefferson City, October 7. Booneville October 9. Lexington October 19. Independence October 22. Big Blue and State Line October 22. Westport October 23. Engagement on the Marmiton, or battle of Chariot, October 25. Mine Creek, Little Osage River, Marias Des Cygnes, October 25. Near Centreville November 2 (Co. "K"). Operations near Waynesville December 1–3 (Detachment). Big Piney December 2 (Detachment). Scouting and escort duty in District of Rolla until July, 1865. McCartney's Mills January, 1865 (Detachment). Scout in Shannon County January 2–7 (Cos. "C," "D," "M"). Operations about Waynesville January 16–22. Scouts from Salem and Licking to Spring River, Ark., and skirmishes February 23-March 2. Scouts from Waynesville to Hutton Valley, Rolla and Lebanon March 5–12. Near Rolla March 24 (Co. "E"). Final mustering out July 8, 1865.

==== 6th Regiment Cavalry, MSM ====
Feb to Apr 1862 - Organized at large in Mo.
Apr 1862 - District of Central Mo.
Jun 1862 - District of SW Mo.
Dec 1862 - District of Central Mo. Jul 1863 - District of SW Mo.
Oct 1864 - District of Northern Mo.
Feb 1865 - District of SW Mo.
February and March, 1865 - mustered out

1 officer and 39 enlisted men were killed or mortally wounded. 1 officer and 45 enlisted men died of disease. 82 deserted, 29 officers and 494 enlisted men were honorably discharged, 1 officer and 163 enlisted men were discharged for disabilities, 4 officers were dismissed, and 18 officers resigned (some to join the 12th, 13th and 14th Missouri Cavalry Regiments).

There were 3 accidental deaths, 16 missing in action, 2 dishonorably discharged, 3 dropped from the rolls, and 2 rejected by medical officer.

==== 7th Regiment Cavalry, MSM ====
Mar-Apr 1862 - Organized at large in Mo.
Apr 1862 - Unattached, Dept. of Mo.
Sep 1862 - District of SW Mo.
Oct 1862 - Unattached, Army Frontier, Dept. of Mo.
Jun 1863 - District of Central Mo.
March and April, 1865 - Mustered out

3 officers and 37 enlisted men were killed or mortally wounded. 5 officer2 and 89 enlisted men died of disease. 71 deserted, 39 officers and 774 enlisted men were honorably discharged, 239 enlisted men were discharged for disabilities, 2 officers were dismissed, and 23 officers resigned (some to join the 12th, 13th and 14th Missouri Cavalry Regiments).

There were 4 accidental deaths, 12 dishonorably discharged, and 1 discharged, being minor.

==== 8th Regiment Cavalry, MSM ====
Dec 1861-May 1862 - Organized at Jefferson City, Bolivar, Warsaw and Linn Creek
May 1862 - Unattached, Dept. of Mo.
Sep 1862 - District of SW Mo.
April and May, 1865 - Mustered out

2 officers and 72 enlisted men were killed or mortally wounded. 2 officer2 and 122 enlisted men died of disease. 166 deserted, 40 officers and 851 enlisted men were honorably discharged, 2 officers and 171 enlisted men were discharged for disabilities, 6 officers were dismissed, and 21 officers resigned (some to join the 12th, 13th and 14th Missouri Cavalry Regiments).

There was 1 accidental death, 6 missing in action, 2 dishonorably discharged, 1 suicide, 1 discharged, being minor, 1 rejected by medical officer, and 2 discharged, over age.

==== 9th Regiment Cavalry, MSM ====
Feb 1862-Sep 1863 - Organized at large in Mo.
May 1862 - District of Rolla
Feb 1863 - District of Northern Mo.
Mustered out February and April, 1865

1 officer and 30 enlisted men were killed or mortally wounded. 2 officers and 54 enlisted men died of disease. 53 deserted, 36 officers and 802 enlisted men were honorably discharged, 98 enlisted men were discharged for disabilities, and 17 officers resigned (some to join the 12th, 13th and 14th Missouri Cavalry Regiments).

There were no accidental deaths, 1 missing in action, 3 dishonorably discharged, and 3 rejected by medical officer.

==== 10th Regiment Cavalry, MSM ====
May 1862 - Organized at Louisiana
May 1862 - District of St. Louis
Feb 1863 - Became 3d Regiment Cavalry, MSM

Casualties not recorded

==== 11th Regiment Cavalry, MSM ====
Jan - Apr 1862 - Organized at large in Mo.
Apr 1862 - District of Northern Mo.
Sep 1862 - Consolidated with 2d Regiment to form 2d Regiment (new)

Casualties not recorded

==== 12th Regiment Cavalry, MSM ====
Dec 1861 - May 1862 - Organized at large in Missouri
4 Feb 1863 - Companies A, B and H transferred to companies K, L and M of the 3d Cavalry MSM. Companies D, E, F transferred to companies K, L and M respectively of the 5th MSM (new). Troops from Companies C and G were divided up between companies within the 5th MSM (new).
Casualties not recorded.

==== 13th Regiment Cavalry, MSM ====
May 1862 - Organized
May 1862 - Attached to District of Rolla
Feb 1863 - Designation changed to New 5th MSM Cavalry

Casualties not recorded

==== 14th Regiment Cavalry, MSM ====
Mar-May 1862 - Organized at large in Mo.
May 1862 - Attached to District of SW Mo.

Companies A, B, C and D transferred to 4th Regiment, Companies E, F, G and H transferred to 8th Regiment, 4 Feb 1863

Casualties not recorded

=== Commanding Generals ===
The following generals commanded the MSM during its existence.

- Maj. Gen. H. W. Halleck - November 19, 1861
- Maj. Gen. Samuel R. Curtis - September 27, 1862
- Maj. Gen. J. M. Schofield - May 29, 1863
- Maj. Gen. W. S. Rosecrans o- February 1, 1864
- Maj. Gen. Grenville M. Dodge - December 13, 1864, resigned June 1865

== Weapons ==
The Missouri State Militia were recruited from the state of Missouri, but armed by the Federal Government. As many other western military units, they were often armed with quality weapons later in the war than eastern armies. Their weapons included both US and foreign made weapons. This resulted in a large variety of weapons, even within a single regiment (unit of approximately 1000 men or less) As an example, the 10th Missouri Cavalry (a United States unit, not militia), were uniformly armed with Gibbs' carbines by December 1863 or earlier, and the 11th Missouri Cavalry was armed with Merrill's and Sharp's carbines, all breech-loading weapons. At that same time, the 1st Missouri State Militia was still armed with 2 calibers of Austrian rifles, and a third caliber of Enfield rifles, all of which were muzzle-loading weapons.

The cavalry specifically had a number of foreign weapons, including the French LeFaucheux military pinfire revolver. The 1st through 10th, 12th and 13 regiments were partially armed with Austrian weapons.

The 1st through 9th, and 14th regiments were partially equipped earlier with the Savage & North Navy (.36) revolver.

In September 1864, the 1st Missouri State Militia unit had 'sixteen different patterns of breech loaders, nine different types of muzzle loaders, and a few double barreled shotguns. Some of the Missourians were armed with nothing but revolvers.'

The 3rd Missouri State Militia unit in July 1863 had Colt Navy (.36 caliber) and Army (.44 caliber) revolvers, receiving 10,000 Navy and 14,000 Army cartridges in that month. For long arms, they carried .69 caliber conversion musket (US M1816/22, US M1842, etc.), .58/.577 caliber rifle-musket (US M1861, British Pattern 1853 Enfield, Austrian Lorenz, etc.), Halls Rifles and Colt Revolving Rifles (possibly .52 cal) along with Wesson carbines. In September 1864, they carried an assortment of weapons including Starr Double Action Revolvers, Savage Figure 8 Navy Revolvers, Colt Revolving Rifles, and at least one Wesson Rifle.

The 5th Missouri State Militia unit, in December 1863 had 633 Austrian rifles, 633 revolvers (primarily Lefaucheaux, Pettengill, Savage and Starr, with a few Colt Army revolvers), 320 sabres, 25 pistol carbines (most likely Colt), 202 pairs of holster pistols (commonly referring to the Colt Army Revolver of 1848), and 50 cavalry musketoons. By the end of the war, some units were also equipped with Wesson carbines (erroneously called 'Smith and Wesson rifles' in one source).

The 5th continued to possess Austrian rifles or carbines as late as September 1864. At that time, they possessed Colt Army (.44 cal), Pettengill, Savage, Starrs (in both Army and Navy calibers) and .36 caliber 'Beals' (Remington Beals) revolvers

The 8th carried Savage Revolvers, as well as some Colts Army revolvers.

=== Specific Weapons ===
Wesson carbines: the 3rd Missouri State Militia had 500, the 6th had 132, and the 8th had 60 in their regimental inventories in 1864. The 5th had 300. Most or all of these were privately purchased, and do not show up on government records.

== See also ==
- Missouri Volunteer Militia
- Missouri State Guard
- Home Guard (Union)
- Enrolled Missouri Militia
- Provisional Enrolled Missouri Militia
