= Bazel F. Lazear =

American Lieutenant Colonel (1823–1894)

- Born: Bazel Ferdinand Lazear; 1823; Virginia, U.S.
- Died: 1894 (aged 70 or 71); Audrain County, Missouri, U.S.
- Burial place: Elmwood Cemetery at Mexico, Missouri, U.S.
- Relatives: Margaret Jane Lazear (wife); Bazel Wells Lazear (son); Marshal Lazear (son); Narcisses Lazear (daughter); Alice Lazear (daughter); Harmon Lazear (daughter); Nathaniel Lyon Lazear (son)
- Military career
- Allegiance: United States
- Branch: Missouri State Militia (Union)
- Service years: 1861–1865
- Rank: Lieutenant Colonel
- Commands: 1st Regiment Missouri State Militia Cavalry
- Conflicts: American Civil War; Shelby's Raid (1863); Second Battle of Independence; Battle of Mine Creek; Battle of Westport; Battle of Byram's Ford

Bazel Ferdinand Lazear (1823–1894) held the rank of Lieutenant colonel in the Missouri State Militia during the American Civil War. His service spanned multiple militia units from 1861 to 1865 before he assumed command of the 1st Regiment Missouri State Militia. Notably, he led this regiment from July to September 1864, participating in key engagements including Shelby's Raid, the Second Battle of Independence, the Battle of Mine Creek, the Battle of Westport, and the Battle of Byram's Ford.

== Early life ==
Lazear, born in 1823 in West Virginia, was a native of Ashley, Missouri. He married Margaret Jane (née Phillips) Lazear, a Delaware native. In a letter to his wife dated 1851, Lazear mentioned his participation in the Californian Gold Rush.

In 1861, the family resided in Ashley, Pike County, Missouri, where they shared their home with their five children: Marshal, Narcisses, Harmon, Alice, and Wells. Additionally, they had a son named Nathaniel Lyon Lazear.

== Military career ==
Lazear initially joined the Pike County, Missouri Home Guard, Company B at the onset of the American Civil War.

He enlisted in the 5th Missouri State Militia, retaining the rank of Captain then rose to the rank of Major in the on August 24, 1861. Lazear was under the command of Pike County lawyer John Brooks Henderson, who co-authored the 13th Amendment, which prohibited slavery in the United States. His promotion to Lieutenant Colonel occurred on July 24, 1861.

His brigade within the 5th Missouri State Militia, was disbanded on January 18, 1862, and he would swiftly join the 12th Missouri State Militia where he was a Lieutenant Colonel. Later, he would move units to the 1st Missouri State Cavalry, which he held the same rank within.

In a letter dated 1862, Lazear offered an explanation to his reasons for joining:

“I can tell you if I could stay at home I would do so, but the reason I can't is this" "In the first it is a duty I owe to my country and to my children to do what I can to preserve this government, as I shudder to think what is ahead for them if this government would be overthrown.”

On April 6, 1863, Lazear transitioned to the 1st Regiment Missouri State Militia Cavalry. In July 1864, Lazear received orders to assume command of the regiment in Lafayette and Saline counties, where his regiment conducted guarding duties and scouting. He would succeed Colonel James McFerran from leadership. During Lazear's command, the headquarters of the regiment remained in the field. On September 16, Colonel McFerran reassumed command from Lazear.

=== Departure from the militia ===
According to the regimental roll call, Lazear was "mustered out" of his regiment on September 13, 1862. Eventually he was discharged from the militia upon the completion of his service term on April 20, 1865

== Civil War ==
=== Early in the war ===
On August 3, 1861, Confederate guerrillas reportedly killed two Home Guard members near Brush Creek, Pike County. Lazear and 75 men were dispatched and organized a search, but found no casualties, and no evidence of a fight. Later within August, Lazear's men battled Confederate guerrillas at Ashley and Louisville, Missouri.

=== Actions at Shelby's Raid ===
Following Shelby's raids on Humansville and Warsaw, Union forces under Brigadier General Ewing, Brigadier General Brown, and Lazear converged on Shelby's raiders from three directions, creating a trap around the Confederate Forces

On October 11, 1863, Lazear led a force of approximately 700 men from the 1st Missouri State Militia Cavalry, engaged in a skirmish with Shelby's Confederate raiders after they departed camp four miles from Boonville.

The skirmish began outside of Boonville and persisted as both neared the Lamine River. Shelby's forces had crossed the river and staged 200 fighters to challenge Lazear's forces from crossing. Federal troops were able to charge and break through, despite a few casualties. According to Lazear's report regarding the incident, there was two federal troops killed, one mortally wounded and four others wounded. While Shelby was occupied fighting Lazear, Brown's forces crossed the La Mine River at Salt Spring. Brown now took over the lead in the chase, he would find Shelby's forces ready for battle at Jonesborough, six miles from Marshall and nine miles from Arrow Rock.

=== Arrow Rock scouting mission ===
At Arrow Rock, Missouri, on August 7, 1864, a scout detachment of 1st Missouri State Militia Cavalry, led by Lazear searched the areas of Miami and Marshall, then proceeded to go to Arrow Rock. They were twice engaged by two parties of Confederate guerrillas. The guerrillas fired a number of shots before scattering. Just before the arrival of the scouting party, the guerrillas had killed a negro. Additionally, the day before, the guerrillas had burned down the courthouse at Marshall, and shot nine negros in and near the town. 20 confederate guerrillas set up camp on the farm belonging to Marshall Piper, on the night of August 7. When Federal troops arrived, Piper did not reveal the Confederates' location as he was a confederate sympathizer. Later, he was shot presumably under Lazear's command.

=== Actions at Second Battle of Independence ===
The battle unfolded in Independence, Missouri, where Lazear assumed a role in General Alfred Pleasonton's strategy for a synchronized assault. The objective was for General Brown's brigade to engage with support from Edward Winslow's men. However, the execution was slow, allowing Confederate forces to regroup about a mile southwest of Independence. Brown's delayed attack finally began, albeit with less force than intended. The front line, comprising the 1st, 4th, and 7th Missouri State Militia Cavalry Regiments, faced obstacles. The 4th and 7th units were blocked by Battery L, 2nd Missouri Light Artillery Regiment, and Colonel James McFerran, leading the 1st Missouri State Militia Cavalry, remained in the rear.

Under Lazear's command, the 1st Missouri State Militia Cavalry skirmished with the Confederates. As pressure mounted on Lazear's line, he requested reinforcements. General Brown, recognizing the situation, located the delayed 4th and 7th Missouri State Militia Cavalry units and the obstructing artillery. He promptly sent them to the front.

With only 30 minutes before sundown, the reinforced Union force, under Lazear's command, launched an attack. The goal was to make the most of the limited time available and address the earlier challenges in the plan's execution.

=== Actions at Battle of Mine Creek ===
On October 24, 1864, Lazarus found himself on the forefront as his unit (1st Brigade, 1st Missouri State Militia Cavalry) closed in on retreating Confederate forces. The Confederates withdrew their approach, causing a pursuit that covered three miles. The Confederates quickly reformed into a defensive line and chose a position on the open prairie near Mine Creek, located at the Osage River.

Lazear's troops, positioned well and ready for action, faced a formidable enemy with superior numbers. Lazear's strategy allowed them to extend their line to the right to counter the enemy's flanking tactics.

The battle unfolded with Lieutenant Colonel Frederick Benteen's brigade joining Lazear's forces. They attacked the enemy's right flank, while artillery support and Lazear's brigade targeted the center and left. The intensity of the assault surprised the enemy, leading to their disorganization and eventual retreat. The victory resulted in the capture of important enemy figures, guns, and a significant number of prisoners.

The success of the charge caused panic and disorder among the enemy, evident in their hasty retreat, the destruction of their supplies, and the scattering of their ill-gotten gains. Some prisoners wearing Union uniforms were executed, following orders, while those in Confederate attire were treated as prisoners of war. The number of captured prisoners exceeded 400.

After reorganizing, Lazear's brigade moved forward, aligning with Benteen's brigade. They advanced toward the reported location where the enemy seemed to be regrouping for another fight. However, facing feeble resistance, the enemy withdrew, and the pursuit continued until nightfall. The exhausted troops then marched to Fort Scott, where they camped for the night. Lazear, following orders, resumed the pursuit of the enemy on the morning of October 27.

== Controversy ==
Lazear is considered a controversial figure by Historian and college professor Vivian Kirkpatrick McLarty, she offered an analysis in the Missouri Historical Review. McLarty wrote the following opinion:

“Letters remaining available indicate that he [Lazear] was seeking glory, a ruthless man, one who handled the truth carelessly and certainly was not one to be trusted."

=== Racist terminology usage ===
Lazear used "the N-word" in several letters (a racial slur used against black people). Lazear wrote regarding to Confederate bushwhackers "[they] ought to be made to eat nigger meat as long as they live."

=== Scoured earth tactics ===
Lazear supported the use of a "scorched earth" tactics, notably employed by Union General William Tecumseh Sherman. Regarding General Thomas Ewing's order demanding residents in all four Missouri counties to evacuate. Lazear proposed Confederate advocates be relocated and their property burned down, stating "the quickest way to destroy [the enemy] is to destroy their subsistence and remove their friends."

Lazear would reflect upon desolation caused by the war, stating "[its] heart sickening," but reverted to the notion that "no punishment on earth great enough [for those rebelled]"

=== Positive analysis ===
Author Wiley Britton had a positive opinion Lazear, writing in his 1899 book "The Civil War on the Border," he would state that "[Lazear] adopted a plan of dealing with the bandits…which produced good results."

“This plan was to fight the guerillas according to their own tactics," Britton commented. "He knew the neighborhoods where they had friends, and which were frequented by them."

== Personal life ==
Regarding personality, Brent Engel of the Hannibal Courier-Post described Lazear as a born leader with charisma and a personality that attracted people's attention, stating that both sides could agree on these qualities.

After the American Civil War ended, Lazear was employed as a railway postal clerk and served as the postmaster of Auxvasse, Missouri.

Lazear is a prolific writer through an extensive series of letters addressed to his family in Ashley. This collection comprises 65 items, encompassing a voluminous 400 pages of historical correspondence.

=== Death ===
Lazear died in Audrain County, Missouri, US, in 1894, aged 70 or 71. He is buried at Elmwood Cemetery, Mexico, Missouri, USA. Lazear is buried among three of his family.
