= 1st Missouri State Militia Cavalry =

- State Flag of Missouri
- Active: April 9, 1862 - July 12, 1865
- Country: United States
- Allegiance: United States; Missouri
- Branch: Missouri State Militia
- Type: Cavalry
- Engagements: Expedition to Spring Hill; Battle of Hog Island; Kingsville Massacre; Battle of Kirksville; Battle of Panther Creek; Battle of Marshall; Battle of Little Blue River; Second Battle of Independence; Battle of Westport; Battle of Mine Creek

Commanders
- Notable commanders: Colonel James McFerran; Lt. Col. Alex. M. Woolfolk

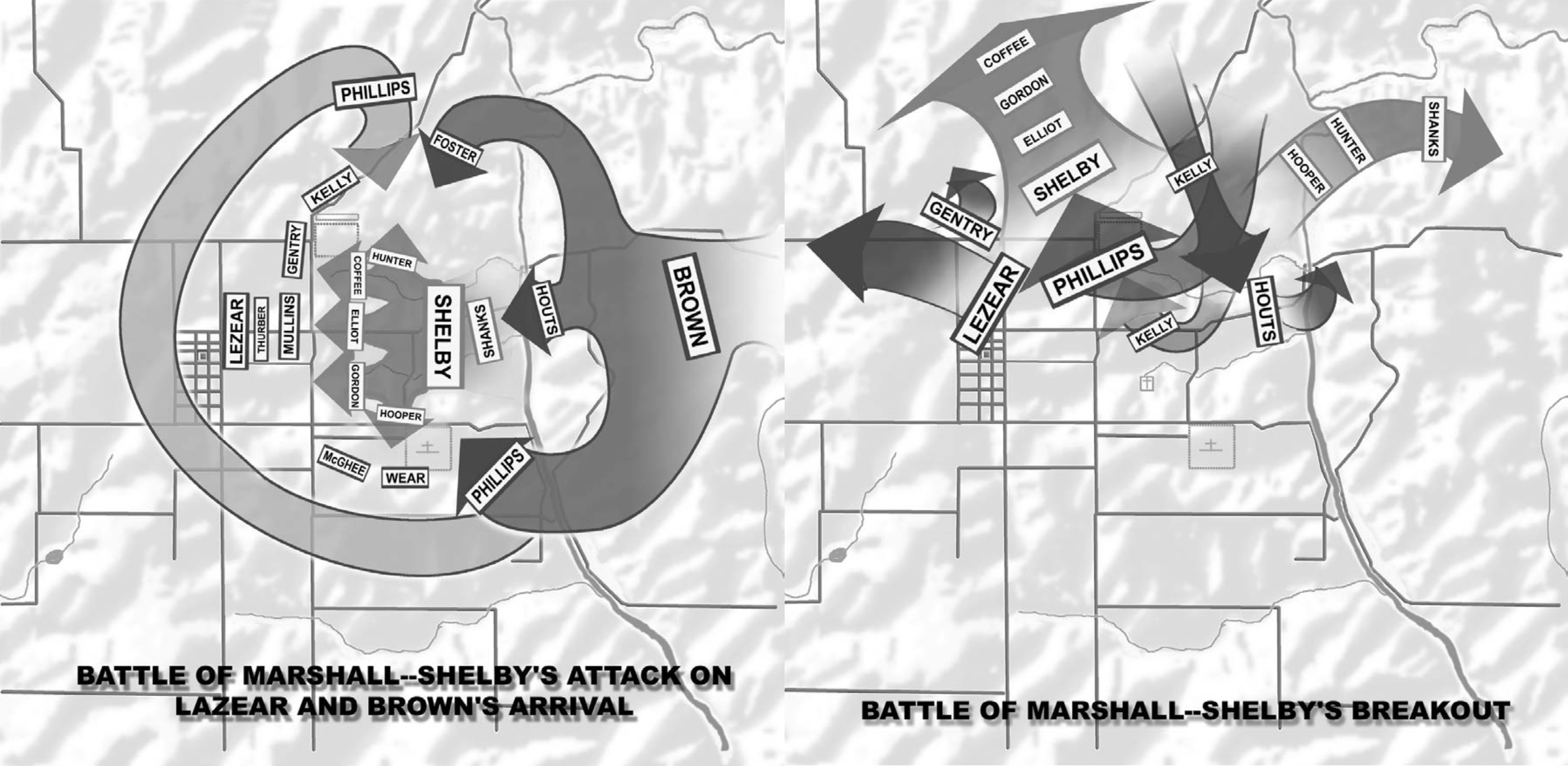
The regiment engaged against Shelby's forces at Marshall.

The 1st Missouri State Militia Cavalry was a cavalry regiment that served under the Union Army during the American Civil War. The regiment was specialized in counter-guerilla operations against Confederate bushwhackers and partisan rangers.

== Organization ==
The regiment was organized at large between February 3 and April 9, 1862. Initially, it was made up of 10 companies, recruited from the counties of Daviess, Sullivan, Putnam, Gentry, Linn, De Kalb, Harrison , and Lundy. The regiment was later augmented by the addition of Company L from Andrew and Buchanan counties and Company M from Worth and Gentry counties.

== Service ==
=== 1862 ===
The regiment spent the duration of the war in Missouri, where they protected loyal citizens and maintained order. The regiment was constantly engaged against Confederate partisans and bushwhackers, such as those led by William Quantrill, Joe Kirk, and William Anderson.

During an expedition to Spring Hill in May 1862, Lt. Col. Woolfolk led a scouting operation at night that led to the capture of Joe Kirk and several of his associates. The regiment took part in operations against Quantrill, pursuing him following his raid on Lawrence, Kansas, in August 1863, and they engaged his forces in various skirmishes in the counties of Jackson and Lafayette.

On August 5, 1862, a small detachment of 14 cavalrymen under Lieutenant Goodbrake, alongside local militia near Cravensville, defeated a force of 85 guerillas led by Davis and Kirk. Three days later, Woolfolk led a 400-man detachment in a six-hour engagement against John C. Porter's command at Panther Creek, where they lost 2 killed and 10 wounded.

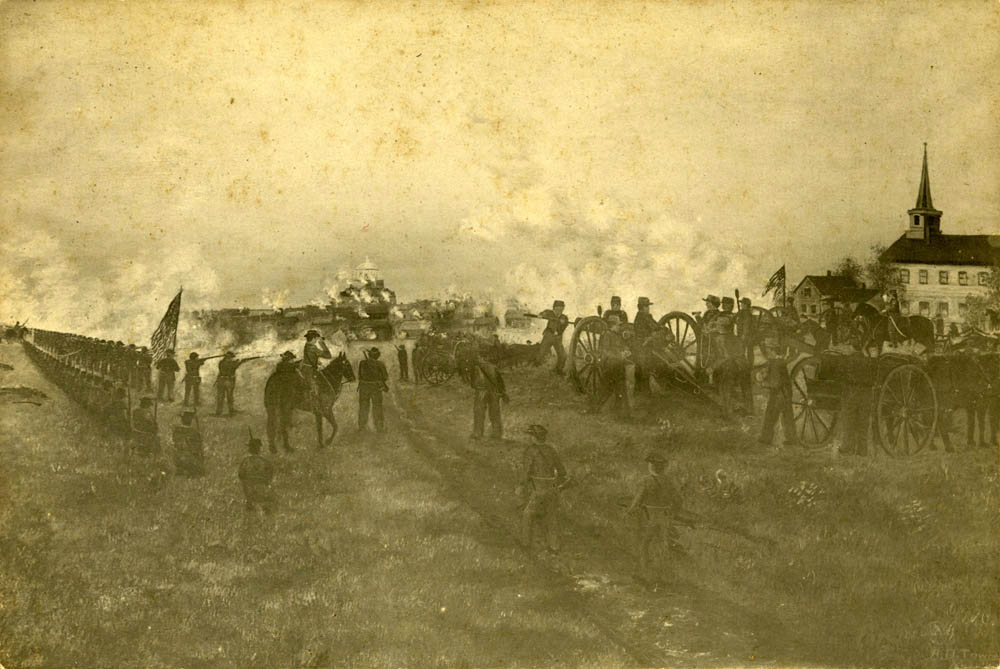
A 1911 painting depicting the Battle of Kirksville, in which Major Cox led a detachment of the regiment

On August 6, 1862. A detachment under Major Cox took part in the Battle of Kirksville, where Union forces secured a victory and effectively broke the large-scale Confederate recruiting in northeastern Missouri.

=== 1863 ===
During 1863, the regiment's operations were centered on the Osage River and the border counties. Major Alexander W. Mullins and Lieutenant Colonel Bazar led frequent scouting operations to flush out Confederate guerrillas. In May 1863, Major Mullins coordinated with the 9th Kansas Cavalry to attack Confederate guerrillas at Hog Island. Although the main body of the guerrillas had fled, the site was identified as a long-term winter rendezvous position for Colonel Parker's forces. In June, a skirmish near Papinsville resulted in one wounded Union soldier and the dispersal of a 50-man guerrilla band. Major Mullins's scouts had captured 20 horses and a significant cache of arms from a guerrilla band. Notably, a 14-year-old boy was taken captive; he provided intelligence that over 200 guerrillas were gathering at Pineville to arrange forage for the Confederate army.

==== 1864 ====
By 1864, the regiment was heavily engaged in high-mobility scouting operations to counter the escalating bushwhacker insurgency. The intensity of these operations were significant; in March 1864, Captain James D. Eads reported that his regiment had traveled a total of 3,200 miles during a single scouting mission through the Greenton Valley and the surrounding regions to suppress guerilla activity.

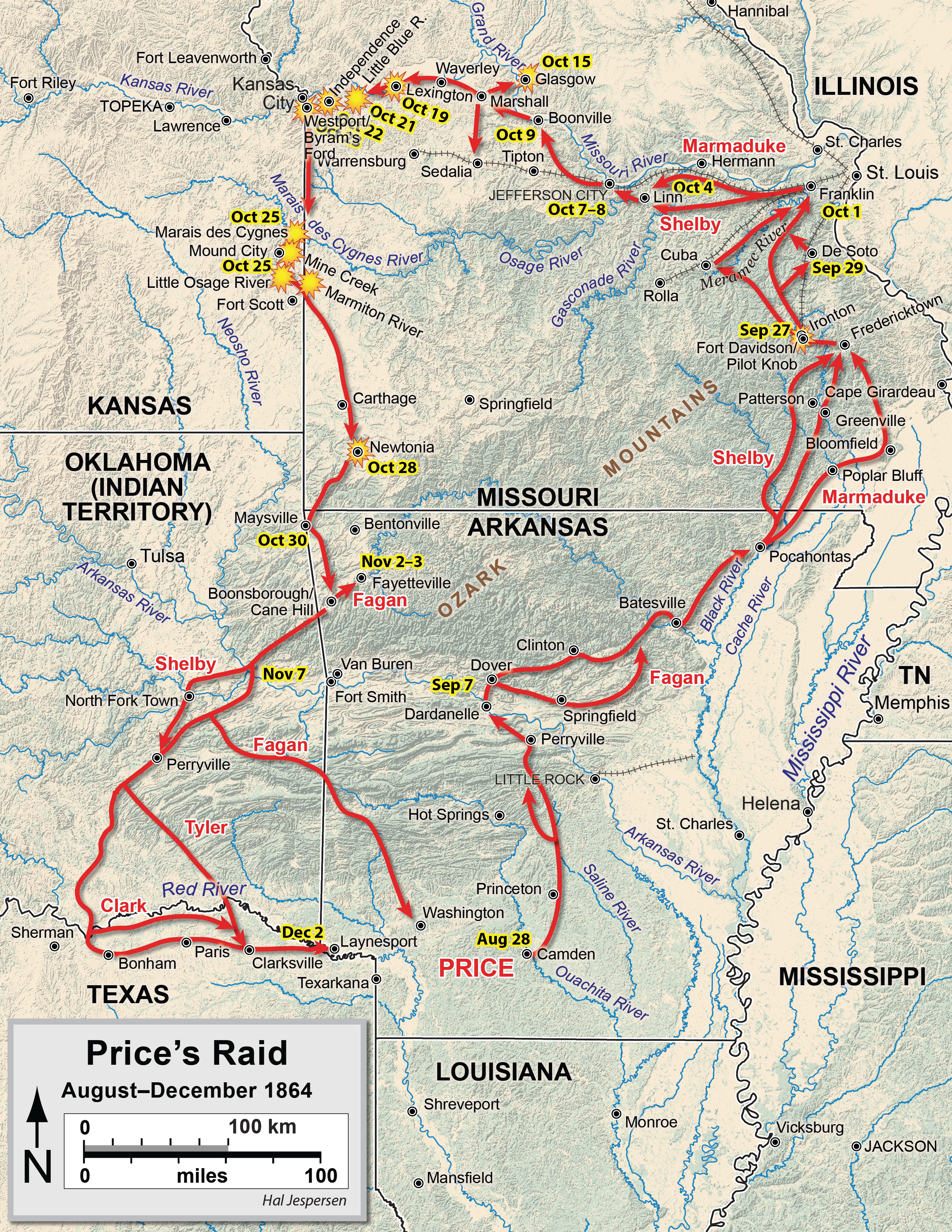
Map of Price's Raid

On June 12, 1864, a 15-man scout from Company M, led by Corporal Joseph V. Parman, was ambushed near Kingsville by a force of 80 to 100 guerrillas under Colonel Yeager and William Anderson. The rebels, dressed in Federal uniforms, killed 12 out of the 15 Union soldiers. Corporal Parman reported that the victims were stripped and, in one instance, scalped. Only a day after the Kingsville tragedy, a 30-man escort for a ration train (Companies F and I) was attacked 12 miles from Lexington by 100 guerrillas. Despite repulsing 3 charges, the detachment was overrun, losing 8 men and their supplies.

The regiment took part in the pursuit of Joseph O. Shelby's Raid through Missouri, engaging him and his forces at Marshall and Jonesborough. During Price's Missouri Expedition in 1864, the regiment saw action at Sedalia, Little Blue River, Independence, and Wesport and also participated in the pursuit of Price's retreating army at Mine Creek.

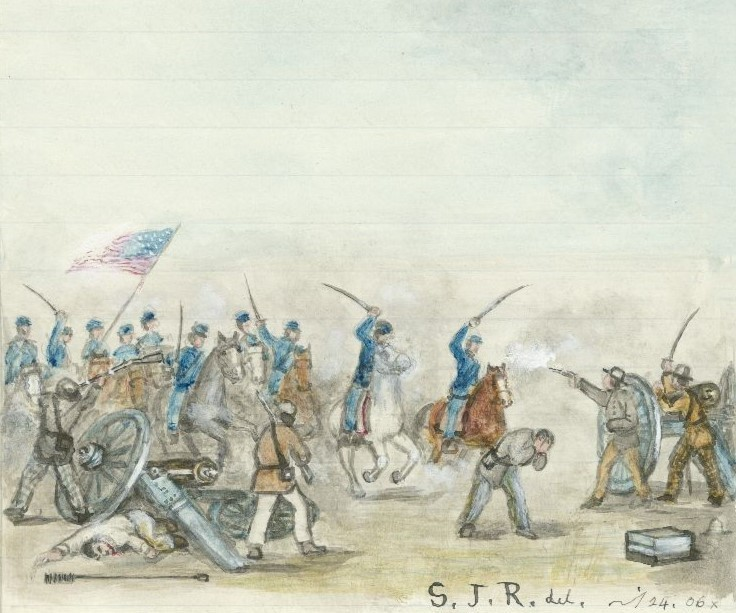
Painting of the Battle of Mine Creek, where a massive Union cavalry charge took place

At Independence, Colonel McFerran led five companies in a gallop through Independence to engage the Confederate rear guard. For nearly an hour, they held the line against a force McFerran estimated ten times their size.

Shortly after the engagement, Pleasonton formally charged McFerran with failing to maintain discipline, alleging that the regiment had become "straggling all over the country" rather than maintaining an effective pursuit of the enemy. Following McFerran's removal, the regiment was led by Major Bazel Lazear during the Battle of Mine Creek.

At Mine Creek, they were commanded by Major Bazel Lazear. The regiment participated in the massive cavalry charge at Mine Creek. Although they were dismounted due to their rifles, the men advanced under heavy fire, contributing to the capture of 8 Confederate guns and approximately 1,000 prisoners, including General Mamarduke.

=== 1865 ===
In February 1865, a coordinated multi-column scout used the passwords of "America" and "Dodge" to prevent friendly fire while scouring the Wagon Knob and Buck Knob regions. Captain Milton Burris successfully surprised a guerrilla camp near Tucker's Mill, capturing all their horses and carbines. Even after the surrenders of Lee and Johnston in the East, the regiment continued to fight. In May 1865, Captain James D. Eads reported that 100 of his men were in the counties of Saline and Cooper.

== Disbandment ==
The regiment was mustered out of service on July 12, 1865.

== Total casualties ==
Two officers and 71 enlisted men of the regiment were killed or mortally wounded, and 2 officers and 67 enlisted men died of disease, for a total of 142 casualties.

== Notable commanders ==
- Colonel James McFerran
- Lt Cl. Alex. M. Woolfolk
- Major Bazel F. Lazear
- First lieutenant Mason Carter

== See also ==
- List of Union units from Missouri in the American Civil War
- Missouri In the American Civil War
