= Shelby's Raid (1863) =

Military campaign during the American Civil War

- Part of the American Civil War
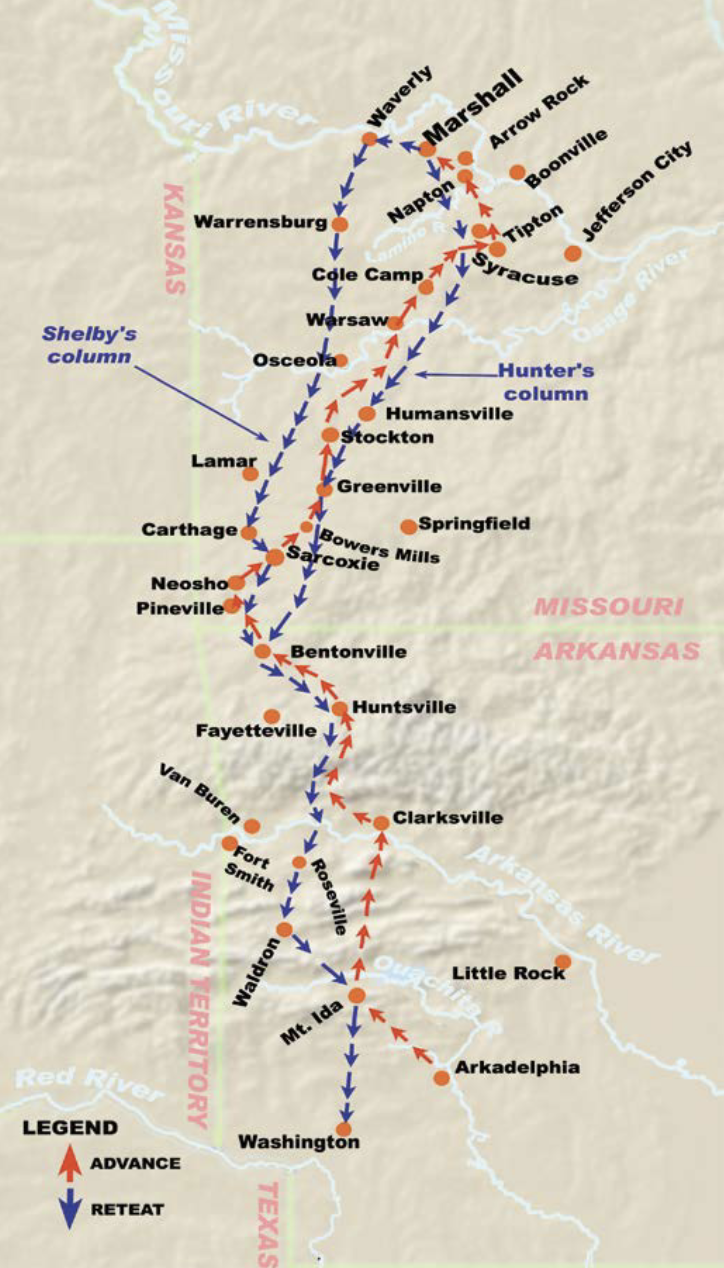
- Map of Shelby's route. Shelby's Raid started in Arkadelphia, Arkansas, and crossed into Missouri near Pineville. The raid targeted Neosho, Greenfield, Humansville, and Warsaw. Shelby's forces broke through Marshall, then retreated through Waverly and Carthage, and finally back into Arkansas.
Date	August 21 – November 3, 1863
Location	Arkansas, Missouri
Result	Mixed results

Belligerents
United States (Union)	(Confederate States of America) Confederate States

Commanders and leaders
John McAllister Schofield; Thomas Ewing Sr. Egbert Benson Brown; Bazel Ferdinand Lazear	Joseph Orville Shelby

Strength
2,350 - 2,800+	600 - 1700+

Casualties and losses
5 dead, 26 wounded, 11 missing	53 dead, 98 wounded, unspecified amount missing

Shelby's Raid, also known as Shelby's Great Raid, was a Confederate cavalry incursion into Arkansas and Missouri during the American Civil War in 1863. Led by Colonel Joseph Orville Shelby, the raid took place from August 21, 1863, to November 3, 1863, covering over 800 miles across territories in west central and northwest Arkansas, as well as southwest and west central Missouri.

== Background ==
In December 1862, the Confederates suffered a defeat at the Battle of Prairie Grove, leading to a retreat and allowing Union forces to seize control of northwestern Arkansas. In January 1863, Fort Hindman, Arkansas fell to Union forces, weakening Confederate positions in the region. Additionally, Confederate attempts to reclaim Helena, Arkansas in July 1863 proved unsuccessful, further diminishing their control over key territories.

In September 1863, the state capital, Little Rock, Arkansas, was captured by Union forces during the Little Rock campaign, leading to the effective control of the Arkansas River Valley. Additionally, on July 3, 1863, the Confederates in the Eastern theater faced a decisive defeat at the Battle of Gettysburg. This defeat compelled General Lee's Army of Northern Virginia to retreat, with casualties numbering in the thousands and making Gettysburg one of the bloodiest battles of the American Civil War.

In July 1863, Union victories at Vicksburg, Mississippi and Port Hudson, Louisiana opened the Mississippi River. The river served as a crucial main route for supplies and communication throughout the South, as well as an essential lifeline for goods traveling north. The succession of strategic battlefield defeats resulted in widespread demoralization and a significant number of casualties, placing a burden on Confederate forces in both the Eastern and Western theaters.

=== Marmaduke's raids ===
In an attempt to uplift the morale of Missouri rebels, Brigadier General John Sappington Marmaduke initiated raids, targeting Springfield, thought to be lightly guarded, on January 8, 1863. Anticipating a surprise attack, Marmaduke's forces were detected near Dubuque, Arkansas on January 6, 1863, by Union Captain Milton Burch's forces. Burch promptly alerted Brigadier General Egbert Benson Brown, who reinforced the town with Enrolled Missouri Militia units. Facing resistance, Confederate Colonel Shelby conducted regiment-sized attacks, probing for weaknesses in the opponent's battle line. Despite attempts to charge, the Confederate forces realized their numbers were insufficient to overcome the garrison, leading to a retreat on January 9.

In April 1863, Marmaduke initiated a second raid with a 5,000-men force divided into two columns, commanded by Colonel George Washington Carter and Shelby. The objective was to attack General John McNeil's garrison in Bloomfield, Missouri. However, McNeil received advance notice of Carter's approach, prompting him to retreat to the well-fortified Cape Girardeau before Carter's arrival. Despite orders not to pursue McNeil, Carter disobeyed, leading to a minor engagement with artillery bombardment involving both Confederate and Union forces. Subsequently, General Marmaduke decided to order a retreat back to Arkansas. This retreat allowed McNeil to pursue and successfully repel the Confederate forces.

== Raid plans ==
Colonel Shelby launched a political campaign to generate and gain approval for his raid. Shelby's men were ready to fight, however final

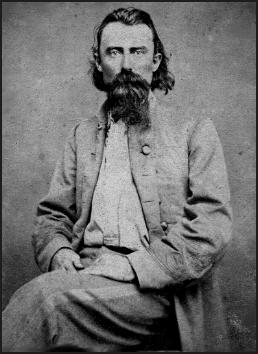
Joseph O. Shelby

approval needed to come from the Missouri governor. Colonel Shelby presented the idea of the Great Raid to Missouri Governor-in-exile Thomas Reynolds. His objectives extended beyond challenging the perceived Union control in Missouri. The following desired outcomes was presented:

- Bolster his command: Recruiting more Missourians and uplift the morale of pro-Confederate residents.
- Divert federal troops to Missouri, hindering their reinforcement of the Union campaign in Chattanooga, Tennessee.

Governor Reynolds said the following to Shelby: "You must not fail; the buff sash of a Confederate Brigadier awaits the successful issue." Reynolds pledged a promotion to brigadier general for Shelby if the raid proved successful.

The disastrous political climate also facilitated Reynolds' decision in approving the raid, as not to risk upsetting Missouri troops.

Initially hesitant, Marmaduke reluctantly granted authority to Major General Theophilus Hunter Holmes for the proposed raid. Following a tumultuous argument, Holmes eventually conceded and agreed to the plan. General Sterling Price, after officially consenting, forwarded the proposal to General Edmund Kirby Smith for ultimate approval. Shelby received orders to launch the raid despite the uncertainty surrounding the chain of command for the operation. Final approval came from Price on August 21

== The raid's advance ==
=== Arkansas River crossing ===
On September 22, departing from Arkadelphia, Arkansas, Shelby's combined force of 600 to 700 men navigated through Federal territory in Missouri. Shelby's unit reached the Arkansas River, crossing the river on September 27 without detection. They crossed into the town of Rossville where Shelby sent a detachment of scouts to Clarksville, Dardanelle, and Ozark to spot Federal troops. While they passed through Huntsville and Bentonville, they committed sabotage on the telegraph wires located Fayetteville Road, which was destroyed as well.

=== Strategic reinforcement ===
At around October 1, Colonel DeWitt Clinton Hunter joined forces with Shelby's formation at McKissick Spring, Arkansas, bolstering their ranks with 200 newly recruited cavalrymen from southwest Missouri. The unified troops, under the command of Shelby, proceeded to Pineville, Missouri, on October 2. There, they encountered Colonel John Trousdale Coffee and his contingent of 400 men, who also joined Shelby's forces. Just north of Pineville, Shelby paused for the night to organize and strengthen his force.

=== Neosho ===
Now numbering between 1,200 and 1,300 men, Shelby launched an attack on a Federal garrison in Neosho. The garrison hosted an estimated 165 to 185 soldiers from three companies of the 6th Missouri State Militia Cavalry and some Enrolled Missouri Militia, under the command of Captain Charles Bingley McAfee. McAfee recently departed from Neosho where he would encounter Coffee's cavalrymen two miles south of Neosho. McAfee ordered a retreat towards the town where they positioned themselves there. Coffee's men circled the town from the rear while Gordon's men took the right flank, and Shanks' men onto the left flank. Shelby, Hooper, and Hunter directed the artillery fire north towards Neosho in a bid to corner the troops into the center of the town, where the courthouse was located. The garrison fell for the trap and small arms fire was exchanged defending the courthouse. Shebly directed the cannon towards the courthouse, after two shots, Shelby demanded the Federals to surrender. After much protest from McAfee, they surrendered. McAfee surrendered 180 men in his command. McAfee reported Shelby's casualties at five killed and nine wounded. Shelby reported McAfee's casualties as two killed and two wounded. Shelby's forces gained extra weapons, ammunition, food, and clothing. Shelby left Neosho to go travel northeast to Sarcoxie.

Stopping at Jones Creek for a five-hour rest, they resumed their journey, passing through Sarcoxie. Once reaching Bowers Mill, the raiders plundered and set ablaze the town, after considering it a safe harbor for Union militias.

=== Greenfield ===
On October 5, Shelby's forces reached Greenfield. Shebly's advanced guard went into brief combat with Capt. E. J. Morris' 7th Provisional Enrolled Missouri. After failing to stop the advance, Morris' men scattered into the dense vegetation before the town was surrounded. Major Wick Morgan, leading a company, from the 7th as well, was near by the town and engaged in skirmish. Shelby eventually took the town, taking four prisoners, twenty-five rifles, horses, provisions from the stores, and burned the courthouse.

=== Stockton ===
Beyond Greenfield, the town of Stockton lay in Shelby's path. Before Shelby's arrival, the local residents had evacuated their homes, taking all their furniture and belongings with them. There was an expectation that Shelby's forces would engage in destruction as they advanced. Contrary to the expectations, Shelby's forces didn't harm any private property. The soldiers passed by without disturbing the residents' possessions left outside. Shelby's forces fought the Federals guarding the courthouse and proceeded to burn down it down, this engagement resulted in twenty-five killed or captured Federals.

=== Humansville ===
Shelby's forces arrived at Humansville on October 6, and engaged in minor skirmishes. Journalist John Newman Edwards would recount: " Gordon, swinging around to its rear, cut off the retreat of one hundred and fifty Federal cavalry, and they surrendered after losing 17 killed." After the brief battle with the local Missouri militia, they seized 30 wagons laden with commissary provisions. While at Humansville, Shelby sent a detachment led by Lieutenant Thomas Keithley, who successfully compelled a Federal garrison of 35 men to retreat in Osceola. Keithley then ignited the Federal fort before rejoining at Humansville without incurring any casualties.

=== Tracking Shelby's movements ===
Federal authorities faced challenges in determining Shelby's exact location following the events in Humansville. General John Schofield informed Ewing that Shelby's raiders were either heading towards Fort Scott or Springfield. This information was delayed, as Shelby had already moved past Pineville and reached Greenfield by the reported date. Furthermore, Colonel John Edwards, leading the District of Southwestern Missouri in Springfield, thought that Shelby's aim was Jackson County, on the Missouri-Kansas border. Ewing believed that Shelby would advance toward Fort Scott before dispersing.

=== Warsaw ===
On the morning of October 7, Shelby arrived in Warsaw from the south. Major Benjamin Franklin Gordon to crossed the Osage River downstream to the east and Shelby launched an attack on Warsaw from the rear. Major Benjamin Elliot's battalion crossed the Osage River to the west of the town to cut off escape, while Shelby himself crossed the river opposite the town and initiated a frontal assault. The garrison in Warsaw, was led by Captain Abraham Darst, 7th Missouri State Militia, Company E. The defenders engaged in combat for 30 minutes until Gordon's arrival from the rear was made apparent. Hooper pursued the federals in the streets and Gordon and Elliot joined in the chase. The defenders were overwhelmed, leading to their retreat, this resulted in unspecified amount of deaths and 79 captured. Federal rifles were looted as well a capture of a "well-provisioned fort".

=== Cole Camp ===
Colonel Bazel Ferdinand Lazear, leading the 1st Missouri State Militia Cavalry, was stationed in Warrensburg when he was instructed by Brown to relocate his unit to Osceola. Lazear learned that Osceola had already been seized and chose to disregard the given orders and proceeded to Clinton, Missouri. Lazear's contingent discovered signs of Shelby's presence near Cole Camp on October 8.

In Cole Camp, most of Shelby's forces were disguised as Federal troops, wearing captured uniform from their looting in Neosho and Warsaw. A resident approached Shelby's disguised men and proclaimed to be hunting rebels in the area with a militia. Shelby ordered the man's execution. In Florence, Shelby's forces enjoyed the spoils of the deserted town, such as shelter and food.

Major Emory S. Foster, leading 200 men along with detachments from B and G Company of the 7th Missouri State Militia, were sent to monitor Shelby's forces. Forster arrived in Warsaw on the 9th, where he discovered that Shelby had advanced towards Sedalia via the Cole Camp road. Foster was able to capture three men of Shelby's rear guard, and to confuse and deceive Shelby, Foster's men dragged branches of trees behind them, generating a significant dust cloud that led Shelby to believe Brown's larger force was close behind. The successful ruse was enhanced where three prisoners was allowed escape and reach Shelby, giving false information about the proximity of General Brown's regiment. As a result, Shelby altered his course to the east in the direction of Tipton instead of Sedalia as originally planned.

=== Tipton ===
On October 10, Shelby approached Tipton and encircled the town before launching an attack. Shelby dispatched a scout detachment to observe a train going westbound. Coincidentally, Lieutenant Colonel Thomas Leonidas Crittenden, commander of the 7th Missouri State Militia Cavalry, was on board, and he spotted the raiders. Crittenden ordered a retreat back east escaping Shelby's grasp.

Tipton was eventually captured and Shelby directed Captain James Woods' 100 strong detachment to Otterville as to sabotage the Lamine railroad bridge. The 28-sized guard detachment at the railroad bridge was ambushed which left the bridge defenseless, Shelby's men set the bridge on fire. Woods captured its commander, Captain Berry of the 5th Provisional Regiment and his 28 men.

=== Syracuse ===
Majors Kelly and Gentry, encountered Shelby's rear guard at Syracuse, six miles west of Tipton. The rebel force, numbering 2,000 and with two pieces of artillery, was charged by Kelly and Gentry, which forced Shelby's forces to a stand. Shelby's forces re-formed, opened fire with artillery, and drove the Union forces back to Syracuse. The Union forces, after being driven back to Syracuse, rode around Shelby's right flank. They met Lazear with 500 men at Tipton. Lazear had overtaken Shelby's rear guard in Tipton and driven them out of the place.

=== Boonville ===
On the October 11, Shelby moved his forces towards Boonville, where he would capture the town without incident, as the mayor surrendered. Shelby's primary goal was to reach Jefferson City, which is forty miles southeast of Boonville.

Federal forces from Lazear and Brown's command strategically divided to surround Boonville. Lazear directed his units to intercept Shelby's rear guard from Tipton, initiating a pursuit that involved engaging with Shelby's forces. The confrontations led to skirmishes where casualties were inflicted, and Lazear's forces succeeded in capturing multiple prisoners. Concurrently, Lazear's advancing forces continued their approach towards Boonville, maintaining contact with Shelby's rear guard.

Brown's 800 men, converged on Boonville through Sedalia road. Brown decided Shelby would be moving east, so he marched his troops off from the road and towards Lazear's forces, he kept Lieutenant G. Will Houts with 30 men on Sadalia road, to guard. Houts met and attacked Shelby's advance guard, killing 4 men. Lazear redirected his forces and rescued Houts, while Shelby escaped and retreated west.

Lazear kept a steady distance from Shelby where they eventually found Shelby's camp. Shelby caught off guard, retreated further west. The raiders organized a defensive position, anticipating a main assault from Lazear. No assaulted happened.

=== Dug Ford ===
Shelby, turned west towards Jonesborough and crossed the Lamine River to set up an ambush at Dug Ford. During the entire morning Lazear's advance guard was in continuous skirmishing with Shelby's rear guard. Lazear forced Shelby to shift west, this maneuver allowed Lazear to kill eight and take four as prisoner. Lazear's own losses amounted to two killed and two wounded.

=== Combined Federal army ===
After the skirmish with Shelby's rear guard, Lazear's force received reinforcement with 120 additional soldiers from the 9th Provisional Enrolled Missouri Militia, led by Captain W.D. Wear. With this addition, Lazear's combined strength reached around 1,150 men.

Brown was ten miles southwest of Boonville with 1,200 men, they consisted of 1st, 4th, and 7th Missouri State Militia Cavalry, with parts of 9th Enrolled Missouri Militia as well. Additionally, Captain Thomas Carr also provided batteries from the 1st Missouri State Militia Light Artillery.

=== Ambush at Dug Ford ===
Shelby directed Gordon and his contingent of 200 men to set up an ambush at Dug Ford on the Lamine River, as the rest of Shelby's forces advanced to the west.

Captain Little of the 7th Missouri Militia, was fixed as Lazear's advanced guard. Little's forces were in the process of crossing the river when Gordon's men opened fire on them causing confusion, effectively causing a halt in the advance. Little's cavalry eventually crossed the river and were close proximity with a second line of rebels, located on the western bank before encountering a volley of gunfire. Shelby documented fifty Federal casualties killed at Dug Ford. This conflicts with Brown's account of two killed and five wounded.

Lazear resumed pursuit of Shelby, going westbound, while Brown followed closely, two miles south of Lazear's column. Brown's objective was to prevent Shelby from breaking southwest and evading capture. Brown's forces crossed the La Mine River in a bid to catch the raiders. After crossing the river, Brown repositioned his troops to the north and engaged Shelby's rear guard. This placed Brown at the front, while Lazear's forces trailed in pursuit to the west. A skirmish unfolded as Shelby's men defensively positioned themselves on the west bank of the Salt Fork, a tributary of the Blackwater River. The clash involved a prolonged exchange of small arms fire and artillery bombardments that continued until darkness descended. Brown reported only one casualty in his ranks, while Shelby's rear guard suffered sixteen fatalities and numerous injuries.

Major Foster led a final mounted charge against Shelby's forces just before dusk, prompting them to retreat in a westward direction and leaving behind a small rear guard. Brown's troops, positioned on the east side of the Salt Fork, saw Brown and Lazear joining forces and engaged in discussions about their subsequent actions. Shelby's men withdrew to a location approximately six miles from Marshall and halted for the night.

During the early morning hours of October 13, Brown directed Lazear to guide his troops south of Shelby's camp, execute a northern turn into Marshall, assume a defensive stance facing east, and get ready to intercept Shelby at Marshall. By approximately 3 A.M., Lazear was prepared for Shelby's arrival as he entered Marshall.

Brown's consolidated force reached approximately 1,600 men, composed of units from various militia units. The discrepancy in the total force emerged due to the inclusion of federal detachments engaged in scouting or town guarding that joined the pursuit. Despite these fluctuations, the organized Federal forces predominantly ranged between 1,400 and 1,600 by the time of the Battle of Marshall.

== Battle of Marshall ==
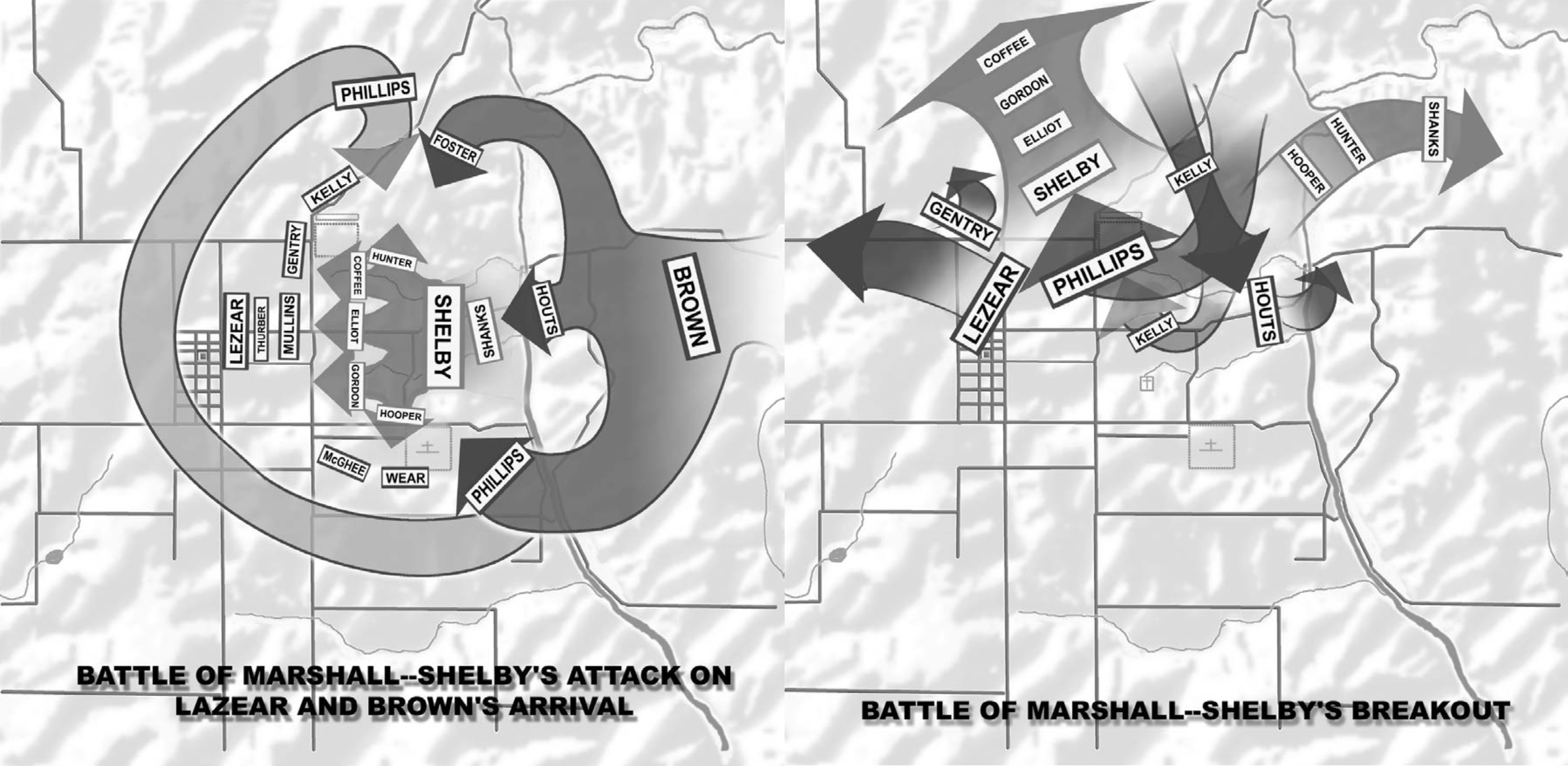
The map on the left shows the attack and the map on the right shows the breakout.

The Battle of Marshall unfolded on the morning of October 13, with Shelby positioned between two formidable forces. To his front was Lazear, and Brown's troops positioned behind him, ready to press his rear guard. Shelby decided to attack Lazear's force first, aiming to eliminate it before dealing with Brown's troops, despite the numerical disadvantage Shelby faced.

Shelby dispatched Major David C. Shanks to destroy the bridge across the Salt Fork west of Marshall to deny Brown's forces from crossing. Brown, in response, ordered Major Houts to engage Shanks, while he took his main force south of Shanks' position, crossing the river to attack Shelby's left. Simultaneously, Major Foster would cross the river north of Shelby to attack his right flank.

As Shelby's advance scouts approached, Lazear ordered his command to line up for defense. Major McGhee and Captain Wear's units were assigned to hold a hill southeast of Marshall to shield against Shelby's attack. The dense vegetation, along with the inclined ravines and hollows, provided both advantages and challenges for Shelby's men. Shelby himself described the terrain as "thick and matted, almost impassable for cavalry." Major Mullins held the center and Major Gentry held the left flank. Major Kelly's artillery were held in reserve.

During Shelby's assault on Lazear, Hooper commanded the left, Hunter and Coffee led the right, and artillery, along with the battalion under Gordon, formed the center, with all cavalry dismounted.

=== The retreat ===
Shelby, persisting in the belief that he confronted a formidable force of several thousand, he still remained unaware that it was nearly double the size of his own. After engaging in four hours of combat, Shelby, recognized the imminent threat of encirclement and hindered by limited ammunition, opted to consolidate his forces and strategically break through a vulnerable point in the Federal's left flank.

Once the raiders gathered and were ready, they went northeast through dense vegetation and deep gorges. Before proceeding, they needed to improvise a bridge to cross a significant ravine along with the supply wagons. However, a mounted charge by Federal forces, spearheaded by Major Young, disrupted Shelby's strategy, causing the raiders to quickly yield under pressure and scatter in various directions. Shelby, Coffee, Gordon, and Elliot, fled to northwest, while Hunter, Shanks and Hooper, escaped to the east.

=== Casualty results of the battle ===
The Federals suffered 5 killed, 26 wounded, and 11 missing. In contrast, Shelby's losses amounted to 53 dead, 98 wounded, and an unspecified number captured.

== Escape to Arkansas ==
Shelby was able to break through Lazear's lines at Marshall and found themselves some distance away from the town. Shelby decided to halt his forces as he wanted to regroup with Hunter's detachment. After waiting an hour, Shelby's forces set their sights for Waverly. While marching to Waverly, Philip's men chased them about eight miles and Shelby was able to hold them off until they reached Germantown. At Germantown, Shelby held his position and the Federals decided to not attack the town.

Shelby reached Waverly and then on October 13, Shelby stopped at Hawkins Mill to recuperate. Shelby decided to get rid of some of his ammunition and supply wagons as to lighten their loads.

The pursuit by Federal forces resumed on the morning of October 14, with Colonel Brutsche and 200 men of the 9th Provisional Regiment joining Phillips in the pursuit westward. Lazear's men encountered Shelby's forces on their way to Lexington, leading to a chase until reaching Davis, where Lazear abandoned the pursuit due to the severe condition of his men and horses. Instead, General Ewing took over the pursuit.

On October 15, Shelby's men passed through Holden, encountering some resistance, and were pursued by General Ewing and Colonel Brutsche. Lazear, now relieved by General Ewing, began a chase. The pursuit continued, with Shelby successfully evading capture and reaching Wadesburg, crossing the Grand River at Settle's Ford.

Ewing's advance guard and Shelby's rear guard fought a minor engagement fifteen miles east of Butler, Bates County. Ewing chased Shelby to Carthage on October 18.

In Carthage, a lapse in alertness resulted in the capture of 30 of Major Pickler and his men from Coffee's command. The lack of a rear guard allowed for their apprehension. The 30 individuals captured would later be paroled.

While Shelby continued his retreat, Hunter's 300 strong detachment had traveled northeast. At Tipton, they were able to gather supplies and then move on to Florence where they battled a garrison. Their route continued with skirmishes against the 1st Arkansas Cavalry, this forced Hunter to go into hiding in the dense vegetation. The rebels would camp near Greenfield, Rock Prairie on October 16.

Hunter's troops moved south with minimal opposition, and was in close proximity by Shelby's forces. Together, they left Carthage for Diamond Springs. General Ewing renewed the pursuit and then returned to Fort Scott as General McNeil was closer to Shelby. McNeil had a strength of 600 cavalry, 300 infantry, and four artillery pieces.

Shelby forced changed directions towards the southeast and traversed the Wire Road near Cassville, where they sabotaged the telegraph lines. Shebly joined Hunter's men near Berryville, at Little Osage River on October 20.

Shelby received word about Federal troops in Huntsville and elected not to engage with them, instead they traveled to the Boston Mountains on October 24. They would also cross the Arkansas River at Clarksville on October 26 and repelled a charge led by McNeil's forces.

In the ultimate leg of their journey, Shelby's forces had to endure a severe snow and ice storm while navigating towards Washington, Arkansas, on November 3. The subsequent day, General Price received a dispatch from Shelby, who sought to leave the remaining portion of his force in Arkansas for reorganization.

== Results and aftermath ==
As a consequence of the raid, Shelby received a promotion to the rank of Brigadier General in the Confederate Army on December 15, 1863.

=== Shelby's report ===
Despite the difficulties and adversities encountered throughout the withdrawal, Shelby stated that his losses were approximately 150 men. He asserted substantial casualties on the Federal side, claiming to have inflicted 600 casualties, captured 500 prisoners of war, destroyed ten forts, and caused over $2 million worth of damage to infrastructure and supplies. Shelby also maintained that his forces gained 800 new recruits, 1,200 guns, and seized 6,000 horses and mules.

=== Historical interpretation ===
Dr. Terry Beckenbaugh, an associate professor, offered an evaluation of Shelby's raid, acknowledging the captivating nature of the narrative while presenting a mixed record in terms of military strategy. Beckenbaugh commended Shelby's tactical instincts, emphasizing the role of luck, audacity, and leadership in the raid's success. However, he expressed skepticism about the accuracy of Shelby's final battle report, suggesting potential exaggerations by John Newman Edwards. Despite the destruction of significant property during the raid, Beckenbaugh argued that the primary objective of diverting federal troops to Missouri did not materialize. Instead, the aftermath left Missourians grappling with the repercussions of property damage, food theft, and loss of lives.

=== Legacy ===
Some veterans of the Missouri Confederate Cavalry used the following expression to boast about Shelby's exploits: "You've heard of Jeb Stuart's ride around McClellan? Hell, brother, Shelby rode around Missouri!"

== Sources ==
- Official Records of the War of the Rebellion, Series I, Volume 22 (Part I), page 621-
- McLachlan, Sean. (2011) Ride Around Missouri; Shelby's Great Raid 1863. Osprey Raid Series #25. Osprey Publishing. ISBN 978-1-84908-429-1
