= John Newman Edwards =

American journalist (1839–1889)

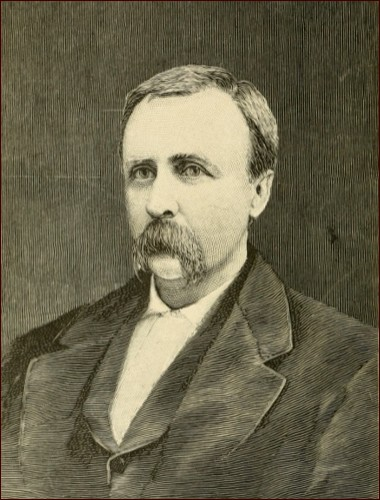
- Born: January 4, 1839; Warren County, Virginia
- Died: May 4, 1889 (aged 50)
- Resting place: Dover Cemetery; Dover, Missouri
- Occupations: Author, Journalist
- Spouse: Mary Virginia Plattenburg (m. 1871)
- Children: 3
- Military career
- Allegiance: Confederate States of America
- Branch: Confederate States Army
- Service years: 1862-1865
- Rank: Major
- Unit: Shelby's Iron Brigade
- Conflicts: American Civil War

Major John Newman Edwards (January 4, 1839 – May 4, 1889) was General Joseph O. Shelby's adjutant during the American Civil War, an author, and a pro-Confederate journalist who founded the Kansas City Times. He is perhaps best known for contributing to the folk hero status of outlaw Jesse James.

== Early life ==
John N. Edwards was born in Warren County, Virginia on January 4, 1839, and moved to Missouri around 1855. As a child, he learned type-setting in Front Royal, Virginia. After settling in Lexington, Missouri, Edwards became a printer for "The Expositor."

== War years ==
In 1862, Confederate General Joseph O. Shelby, raised a cavalry regiment near Waverly, Missouri, in Lafayette County. Edwards joined it. In September 1863, he was appointed brigade adjutant, with the rank of major. In this position he handled various staff affairs for this commander, including the reconnaissance and intelligence required for effective military command. As a result of his great ability in recruiting agents and knowledge of the territory, when Shelby was promoted to command a division, Edwards became the division's adjutant. He held the position until the war ended in May 1865, when Shelby's command disbanded.

Consequently, Edwards participated in every one of Shelby's noted campaigns including the early battles at Prairie Grove and Wilson's Creek. When Shelby had formed his full strength "Iron Brigade" of Missouri volunteers in 1863, Edwards helped organize, provision, reconnaissance, and gather intelligence on what was to be the longest cavalry raid of the war at that time, Shelby's Great Raid. Between September 22 and November 3, 1863, Edwards helped maintain and keep the brigade intact as it travelled 1,500 miles through Missouri, inflicting over 1,000 casualties on Union forces, and capturing or destroying an estimated $400,000,000 worth of Federal supplies and property in 2000 year prices. When Shelby was promoted to Brigadier General on December 15, 1863, at the successful conclusion of his raid, Edwards was also promoted.

In 1864, Union General Steele's Camden Expedition (March 23–May 2, 1864) was initiated to destroy all remaining Confederate forces to the east of the Mississippi and drive out all remaining Confederate sympathizers throughout Missouri and Arkansas and Mississippi. Due to Edwards' now vast intelligence network and clandestine cache system of supplies, Shelby was able to lead a brilliant and determined harassment of the larger Union Army and in concert with other Confederate forces defeat the army and force it back into Little Rock, where it was placed under siege after Shelby located and destroyed or captured the Army's entire supply train at Mark's Mill.

Reassigned with Shelby to the Clarendon, Arkansas area, Edwards' intelligence network located the Union ironclad USS Queen City. When Shelby's feint northward encouraged its Union Army defenders to leave the ironclad, thereby leaving it essentially undefended, Shelby silently returned and captured it. However, hot on his heels was the larger Union Army, and Shelby destroyed it to avoid recapture.

As summer was ending Shelby then commanded a division during Sterling Price's Missouri raid. Edwards distinguished himself at the battles of Little Blue River and Westport, and organized the loot captured at many Union held towns, including Potosi, Boonville, Waverly, Stockton, Lexington, and California, Missouri. Organizing these provisions was a feat in itself, and it enabled Shelby's force to make magnificent inroads into Union territory.

== Post war ==
After Robert E. Lee's army surrendered in Virginia, in June 1865, rather than surrender, Shelby along with Edwards and approximately 1,000 of his remaining troops rode south into Mexico. For their determination not to surrender, they were immortalized as "the undefeated". A later verse appended to the angry post-war Confederate anthem, "The Unreconstructed Rebel" commemorates the defiance of Shelby and his men:

I won't be reconstructed, I'm better now than then.
And for a Carpetbagger I do not give a damn.
So it's forward to the frontier, soon as I can go.
I'll fix me up a weapon and start for Mexico.

Their plan was to offer their services to Emperor Maximilian as a 'foreign legion.' Maximilian declined to accept the ex-Confederates into his armed forces, but he did grant them land for an American colony in Mexico near Veracruz. Organized as a great troop train of 1,000 men, Edwards and the other cavalry made a defiant portrait as they rode south with the Union Army hot on their heels. Once again Edwards' network and what remained of the Confederate Secret Service managed a remarkable feat in disguising the troop and providing it with supplies in its long march. Additionally, they had already managed to negotiate the purchase of hundreds of thousands of acres around Veracruz, Mexico, to which the Shelby and other Confederate army exiles would regroup.

Reportedly, Shelby sank his battle flag in the Rio Grande near present-day Eagle Pass (TX) on the way to Mexico rather than risk the flag falling into the hands of the Federals. The event is depicted in a painting displayed at the Eagle Pass City Hall. The memory of Shelby and his men as "The Undefeated" is used as a distant basis for the 1969 John Wayne-Rock Hudson film by the same name.

== In Mexico ==
Edwards followed Shelby to Mexico. Although he and Shelby's troop and others made it to Mexico, where they offered their swords to Maximilian, the United States government threatened invasion. Additionally, Maximillian was already facing increasing pressure from the Mexican insurrection, which was spearheaded by forces loyal to the legitimate government of Benito Juarez. Not wanting to incur the enmity of the victorious Union, the Emperor denied the troopers entry into his army but did allow them to settle around Veracruz.

With Edwards having obtained a land grant from Maximilian, this enabled Shelby to found the Colony of Carlota. Backed by the publishing and rhetorical skills of Edwards and recent Governor of Louisiana Henry Watkins Allen, thousands of other Confederate soldiers also arrived. Here the ex-Confederates rebuilt their arms and temporarially their fortunes. Allen had received a $10,000 grant from Maximilian to establish a full English language newspaper, "The Mexican Times." He was joined by Edwards who continued the venture after Allen's death from yellow fever. The grant exhausted, Edwards' business skills were insufficient to retain the paper. It was sold to C.B. Barksdale under whom it prospered until suppressed by Porfirio Diaz's supporters after they captured Mexico City. Edwards wrote his first book while in Mexico, "An Unwritten Leaf of the War".

However, as had happened before and later in Mexican history, land sold/granted to foreigners was just as often expropriated. With the overthrow of Maximilian, all of the land was appropriated by the restored republican government of Mexico two years later.

Meanwhile, Reconstruction had resulted in the replacement of the existing secessionist Southern Democrat state governments. Nonetheless, in the intervening two years, the Johnson Administration in Washington D.C. as well as other State government's had granted amnesty to most Confederate leaders. With upheaval in the South, leaders of Southern resistance to Reconstruction begged Shelby, Edwards, and others to return.

As the French withdrew their occupation forces supporting Maximilian in 1866, Shelby returned to Missouri in 1867 and resumed farming. In 1883, Shelby was a critical witness for fellow ex-Confederate Frank James at James' trial.

== Reconstruction ==
Returning to Missouri in 1867, Edwards joined The Republican as a reporter. The following year, he began the Kansas City Times, a staunch Democratic paper in a military ruled state governed by Republican Party officials. Edwards used the paper to champion a return to prominence of former Missouri Confederates, denounced black jurors, "scalawags", and "carpetbaggers", and agitated against military occupation. After the 1869 robbery of the Daviess County Saving Association in Gallatin, Missouri, Edwards met with Jesse and Frank James. In the pages of the Kansas City Times Edwards established the James Brothers as symbols of ex-Confederates "striking back" against perceived corruption, graft, oppression and criminality of military backed Republican rule in Missouri.

On March 28, 1871, Edwards eloped and married a cousin, Mary Virginia Plattenburg, on the Shelby farm. Her parents objected to their marriage because of their family relationship. The union eventually produced two sons and a daughter.

Edwards remained at the Times until 1873. He then moved to St. Louis to edit The Dispatch. On September 4, 1875 he fought a pistol duel with Col. Emory S. Foster, editor of the St. Louis Journal, who had accused him in print of lying. Neither man was injured.

Edwards left the Dispatch, planning to move to Santa Fe and raise sheep. However, he was persuaded by friends and family to remain in Missouri.

In 1877, Edwards published Noted Guerrillas, an account of Confederate partisan warfare during Civil War in western Missouri and border Kansas. Edwards grew concerned by the early-1870s that Missouri, a divided state which ultimately remained in the Union, would be isolated from the mainstream Lost Cause movement. So more than just a chronicle of the guerrilla war in the western borderlands, "Noted Guerrillas" also functioned as the basis of an "irregular Lost Cause" that Edwards specially constructed for Missouri. William Clarke Quantrill, "Bloody Bill" Anderson, and the James brothers, Frank and Jesse, were among the bushwhackers deified as Confederate heroes in place of standard Lost Cause icons like Robert E. Lee, J.E.B. Stuart, and P. G. T. Beauregard. He later moved to Sedalia to become editor of The Democrat. He next became editor of the St. Joseph Gazette.

In 1887, Edwards returned to Kansas City as editor of the paper he had founded. Edwards' health was damaged by alcoholism, and he died in 1889 at the age of 50 in Jefferson City. He was buried in Dover, Missouri.

== Writings ==
- Edwards, John N. (1877). Noted Guerrillas: or, The Warfare of the Border. St. Louis: H.W. Brand & Co. p. 464.
- Edwards, Mary Virginia Plattenburg; Edwards, John N. (1889). Biography, Memoirs, Reminiscences and Recollections. Kansas City: J. Edwards. p. 446.

== Bibliography ==
- Christensen, Lawrence O.; Foley, William E.; Kremer, Gary R.; Winn, Kenneth H. (1999). Dictionary of Missouri Biography. Columbia: University of Missouri Press. pp. 276–277. ISBN 978-0826260161.
- Hulbert, Matthew Christopher (2016). The Ghosts of Guerrilla Memory: How Civil War Bushwhackers Became Gunslingers in the American West. Athens: University of Georgia Press. ISBN 978-0820350028.
