= Mason Carter =

19th century U.S. Army Officer

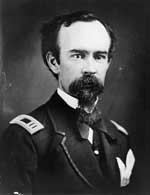
- Born: January 26, 1834; Augusta, Georgia, US
- Died: December 11, 1909 (aged 75); San Diego, California, US
- Burial place: Fort Rosecrans National Cemetery
- Military career
- Allegiance: United States of America; Union
- Branch: United States Army; Union Army; United States Navy
- Service years: 1848–1856 (Navy); 1860–1898 (Army)
- Rank: Midshipman (Navy); Major (Army)
- Nickname: Mason Howard
- Unit: 5th Infantry Regiment
- Conflicts: American Civil War; Indian Wars
- Awards: Medal of Honor
- Other work: Professor of military science

Mason Carter (January 26, 1834 – December 11, 1909) was a U.S. Army officer who served in the American Civil War and the Indian Wars during the late 19th century. He received the Medal of Honor for his role in the Battle of Bear Paw fought on January 8, 1877.

At the age of 14, Carter enlisted with the United States Navy and went to sea as an active midshipman and upon his return he attended the United States Naval Academy. After failing the final examination repeatedly, he resigned from the Navy in 1856. He enlisted with the United States Army in 1860. While in the army he fought in several wars, including the American Civil War and received the Medal of Honor for his actions at Bear Paw Mountain, Montana during the Indian Wars.

He retired from the military as a captain. After his retirement, he was professor of military science at the University of the South.

== Biography ==
He was born as Cary Carter on January 26, 1834, to John Carter and Martha Flournoy in Augusta, Georgia and his grandfather, Thomas Flournoy, was an American general during the War of 1812. He went to sea at the age of 14 when he enlisted in the United States Navy as an acting midshipman. During the next eight years, he attended the United States Naval Academy at Annapolis, Maryland while on active duty in the Mediterranean and the Atlantic Ocean. Failing the final exams three times, he was unable to graduate from the academy and eventually resigned in 1856.

In 1860, he enlisted in the 1st U.S. Infantry under the name Mason Howard and was sent to the Indian Territory, participating in operations against the Comanche until the start of the American Civil War when the Union withdrew its forces to Kansas. Serving under General Nathaniel Lyon, Mason was later wounded at Battle of Wilson's Creek on August 10, 1861. He began using his real name the following year and served as a first lieutenant with the 1st Missouri State Militia Cavalry for a brief time before accepting a commission as a second lieutenant in the 5th U.S. Infantry on May 12, 1862. He would eventually become a first lieutenant in 1864, and changed his name permanently to Mason Carter in 1869.

He was brevetted for his actions against "hostile Indians" between Fort Hays and Fort Harker on October 18, 1867. During the Black Hills War, he would be involved in skirmishes against Sitting Bull in 1876 and Crazy Horse in June 1877. On September 30, while commanding a company during Battle of Bear Paw, he successfully led a charge under heavy fire "dislodging the enemy and causing the Indians considerable losses" despite losing nearly one-third of his command within a half-hour. For his actions during the battle, Carter was awarded a brevet and the Medal of Honor.

He was promoted to captain on September 4, 1878, he remained at that rank until his retirement on January 26, 1898, and became a major on the retired list in 1904. After his retirement, he became professor of military science at the University of the South in Sewanee, Tennessee for ten years. After leaving the university he moved to California, where he died in San Diego December 11, 1909. He is buried at Fort Rosecrans National Cemetery. His grave can be found in section PS-4, grave 102. He was the first recipient of Medal of Honor to be interred there.

Major Carter was a companion of the California Commandery of the Military Order of the Loyal Legion of the United States.

== Medal of Honor citation ==
Rank and organization: First Lieutenant, 5th U.S. Infantry. Place and date: At Bear Paw Mountain, Mont., September 30, 1877. Entered service at: Augusta, Ga. Birth: Augusta, Ga. Date of issue: November 27, 1894.

Citation:

Led a charge under a galling fire, in which he inflicted great loss upon the enemy.

== See also ==
- List of Medal of Honor recipients for the Indian Wars
