= Egbert B. Brown =

American general (1816–1902)

Egbert Benson Brown
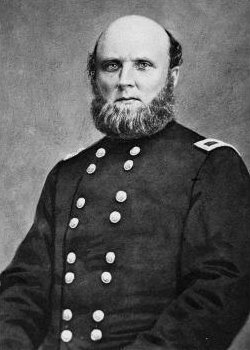
- Brig. Gen. Egbert B. Brown
- Born: October 4, 1816; Brownsville, New York
- Died: February 11, 1902 (aged 85); West Plains, Missouri
- Burial place: Kinder Cemetery, Cuba, Missouri
- Military career
- Allegiance: United States of America; Union
- Branch: United States Army; Union Army
- Service years: 1861–1865
- Rank: Brigadier General
- Commands: District of Central Missouri; District of Rolla
- Conflicts: American Civil War; Second Battle of Springfield; Shelby's Raid (1863); Battle of Westport

Egbert Benson Brown (October 4, 1816 – February 11, 1902) was a Union general in the Trans-Mississippi Theater of the American Civil War.

== Early life and education ==
Egbert Brown was born in Brownsville, New York, and as a young man sailed on a whaler before settling in Toledo, Ohio, in the early 1840s. He was a respected grain dealer and built the first steam elevator in town. After successively working his way to Mayor of Toledo in 1852, he moved to St. Louis, Missouri, in 1852 and engaged in the railroad business.

== Civil War ==
In August 1861, Brown was commissioned as the lieutenant colonel of the 7th Missouri Volunteer Infantry Regiment. He resigned this position in May 1862 to become a brigadier general of the Missouri State Militia (Union). He was appointed as a brigadier general of U.S. volunteers to rank from November 29, 1862.

Brown's duties primarily involved suppressing Confederate guerrillas and opposing raids from Arkansas and the Indian Territory. Among the high points of his career were two victories over Joseph Shelby, at the Second Battle of Springfield (1863) during Marmaduke's first raid, and at Marshall, Missouri, during Shelby's Great Raid of 1863. Brown was severely wounded in the shoulder at Springfield and lost the use of an arm. He commanded the District of Central Missouri during 1863 and through 1864.

Although successful in many engagements, Brown was criticized by some for lack of vigor. This came to a head during Sterling Price's 1864 raid of Missouri. At the Battle of Westport, Union Major General Alfred Pleasonton relieved Brown of command and arrested him for failing to promptly obey an order to attack. Brown then assumed command of the District of Rolla in January 1865 until the end of the war.

== Post-war ==
Brown was the United States pension agent in St. Louis from 1866 to 1868. He resigned to operate a farm in Illinois. He died in the home of a granddaughter at West Plains, Missouri, on February 11, 1902, and was buried next to his wife in Cuba, Missouri.

== See also ==
- List of American Civil War generals (Union)

== Sources ==
- Warner, Ezra, Generals in Blue, Louisiana State University Press, 1964/2002.
