= Shelby's Iron Brigade =

Confederate cavalry brigade

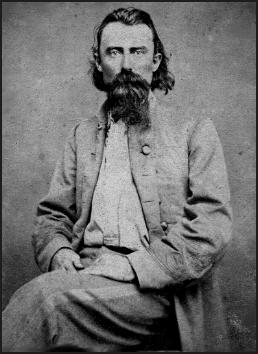
- "Shelby's Iron Brigade" was formed in 1863 by their leader, Brigadier General Jo Shelby, during the American Civil War and served with him until 1865, when they disbanded in Mexico after the war ended. Photograph of Shelby, circa 1861-1865.
- Active: 1863–1865
- Country: Confederate States
- Allegiance: Missouri (Confederate)
- Branch: Army
- Type: Cavalry
- Size: Brigade
- Part of: Army of Arkansas; Army of Missouri
- Nicknames: Iron Brigade; Missouri Iron Brigade
- Engagements: American Civil War: Shelby's Raid; Price's Missouri Expedition; Battle of Marmiton River; Battle of Sedalia; Battle of Little Blue River; Battle of Westport

Commanders
- Notable commanders: Jo Shelby; M. Jeff Thompson

Shelby's Iron Brigade, also known as the Missouri Iron Brigade, was a Confederate cavalry brigade, led by Brigadier General Joseph O. Shelby, in the Trans-Mississippi Theater of the American Civil War.

== Brigade nickname ==
The Iron Brigade nickname was created by Joseph O. Shelby's former adjutant, John Newman Edwards, in his 1867 account, Shelby and His Men.

== Brigade formed ==
Shelby's Iron Brigade was originally formed in 1863, under orders from Major General Thomas C. Hindman, following a successful recruiting expedition into Missouri by Joseph O. Shelby, Upton Hays and John T. Coffee, who each recruited a regiment of cavalry. These new regiments - Shelby's 5th, Hays's 11th and Coffee's 6th (redesignated as 12th), were brigaded under the command of Colonel Shelby.

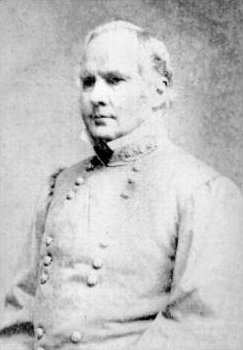
Jo Shelby's "Missouri Iron Brigade" served in 1864, under Arkansas Confederate Major General Sterling Price, in his great offensive into Union-held, Missouri.

== Campaigns ==
Shelby's Iron Brigade based themselves in Arkansas and participated in four major raids into Missouri during the war, earning a reputation as the most formidable brigade in the theater.

Shelby was promoted to Brigadier General, following his successful raid of 1863. When Shelby later assumed division command, he was replaced by M. Jeff Thompson. The brigade remained in Shelby's Division in the Army of Missouri and fought in Maj. Gen. Sterling Price's Missouri Expedition in 1864—saving Price's army from destruction several times, including the retreat at the Battle of Marmiton River.

In the autumn of 1864, some 1,500 of Shelby’s Iron Brigade cavalry surrounded Sedalia, Missouri and overpowered local Union militia defenders. They began to loot and sack the town on October 15, 1864. Once General Thompson arrived in Sedalia, he ordered his men to stop the destruction and moved them on, leaving Sedalia once again in Union hands.

Later, the Missouri Iron Brigade distinguished themselves at the 1864 battles of Little Blue River and Westport, and captured many towns from their Union garrisons, including Potosi, Boonville, Waverly, Stockton, Lexington, and California, Missouri.

== Brigade disbanded and resettled in Mexico ==
Rather than surrender in 1865 with the collapse of the Confederacy, Shelby and his men rode south into Mexico in June, where they offered their services to Emperor Maximilian, who declined to accept the ex-Confederates into his armed forces. However, the emperor did grant them land for an American colony in Mexico, and many of Shelby's Iron Brigade settled on the free land.

== See also ==
- List of Missouri Confederate Civil War units
