= Wagon Knob =

Hill in Missouri, U.S.

Coordinates: 38°56′41″N 93°57′38″W

Wagon Knob is a summit in southern Lafayette County in the U.S. state of Missouri. The summit has an elevation of 1,001 feet (305 m). The feature consists of a linear north-south oriented ridge with two summits. The hill is west of Missouri Route 131 and 3.5 mi (5.6 km) south of Odessa.

Wagon Knob was named after a wrecked wagon which was left there.
