= Joseph O. Shelby =

Confederate States Army general (1830–1897)

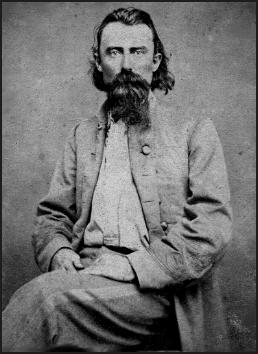
- Shelby in uniform, 1860s
- Born: December 12, 1830; Lexington, Kentucky, U.S.
- Died: February 13, 1897 (aged 66); Adrian, Missouri, U.S.
- Burial place: Forest Hill Calvary Cemetery; Kansas City, Missouri, U.S. 39°00′07.0″N 94°34′12.8″W
- Spouse: Elizabeth Nancy Shelby (m. 1857)
- Military career
- Allegiance: Confederate States
- Branch: Confederate States Army Missouri State Guard
- Service years: 1861 (MSG); 1861–1865 (CSA)
- Rank: Brigadier-General (CSA)
- Commands: Shelby's Brigade
- Conflicts: American Civil War; Battle of Carthage; Battle of Wilson's Creek; Battle of Pea Ridge; Battle of Prairie Grove; Shelby's Raid; Camden Expedition; Price's Missouri Expedition

Joseph Orville Shelby (December 12, 1830 – February 13, 1897) was an American Confederate officer who commanded cavalry in the Trans-Mississippi Theater of the American Civil War. After the Confederacy surrendered, Shelby tried to swear fealty to Emperor Maximilian I during the second French intervention in Mexico. With the Emperor's permission, Shelby formed the New Virginia Colony, a colony of Confederate exiles in Mexico, until the end of the intervention in 1867, after which he abandoned the colony.

== Early life and education ==
Joseph Orville Shelby was born on December 12, 1830, in Lexington, Kentucky, to one of the state's wealthiest and most influential families. He lost his father at age five and was raised by a stepfather, Benjamin Gratz, who was a member of wealthy Lexington elite. Shelby attended Transylvania University and was a rope manufacturer until 1852. He then moved to Waverly, Missouri, where he engaged in steamboating on the Missouri River. He also ran a hemp plantation, a ropeworks, and a sawmill. These business ventures made Shelby one of the wealthiest men in the state of Missouri.

== Bleeding Kansas ==
When the Kansas-Nebraska Act of 1854 was passed, the New England Emigrant Aid Company paid for Northern abolitionists to move to Kansas. As a response, the Blue Lodge, a quasi-Masonic organization, was formed by leading Missourians. This group was dedicated to making Kansas a slave state. J.O. Shelby was a leading member. Shelby's first direct involvement in Kansas was at Lawrence during the March 30, 1855, election of the Kansas territorial legislature. Many Missourians without residence in the territory voted illegally in the election. This was partially achieved through intimidation of election judges, who were prevented from administering residency oaths. Additionally, Shelby and other Missourians harassed several abolitionists attempting to vote, although they were generally not prevented from doing so.

Shelby's leadership in the Missouri–Kansas border war damaged his business ventures and partnership with his stepbrother, Henry Howard Gratz. In December 1855, their new sawmill burned, and evidence suggested the use of an incendiary. The mill was uninsured, and losses exceeded $9,000. Gratz returned to Lexington, Kentucky, and Shelby auctioned off the business in February 1860.

== American Civil War ==
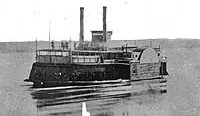
The USS Queen City

Following the Confederate attack on Fort Sumter in April 1861, Missouri Governor Claiborne Fox Jackson refused Lincoln's call for volunteers and maneuvered to take the state out of the Union. The resulting friction between state and federal militias vying for control of the St. Louis Arsenal led to the Camp Jackson affair and the creation of the pro-secession Missouri State Guard.

Shelby formed the Lafayette County Mounted Rifles for Missouri State Guard service and was elected the company's captain, leading it into battle at Carthage, Wilson's Creek, and Pea Ridge. In 1862, he was promoted to colonel and authorized to recruit a Confederate cavalry regiment, returning to Lafayette County to do so. After successfully bringing the regiment safely back to Arkansas, he was given command of a brigade of newly recruited regiments.

In the fall of 1863, Shelby led his "Iron Brigade" of Missouri volunteers on what was at the time the longest cavalry raid of the war, Shelby's Raid. Between September 22 and November 3, 1863, Shelby's brigade traveled 1,500 miles through Missouri, inflicting over 1,000 casualties on Union forces and capturing or destroying an estimated $2 million (~$41 million in 2025) worth of federal supplies and property. He was promoted to brigadier general on December 15, 1863, following the successful conclusion of his raid.

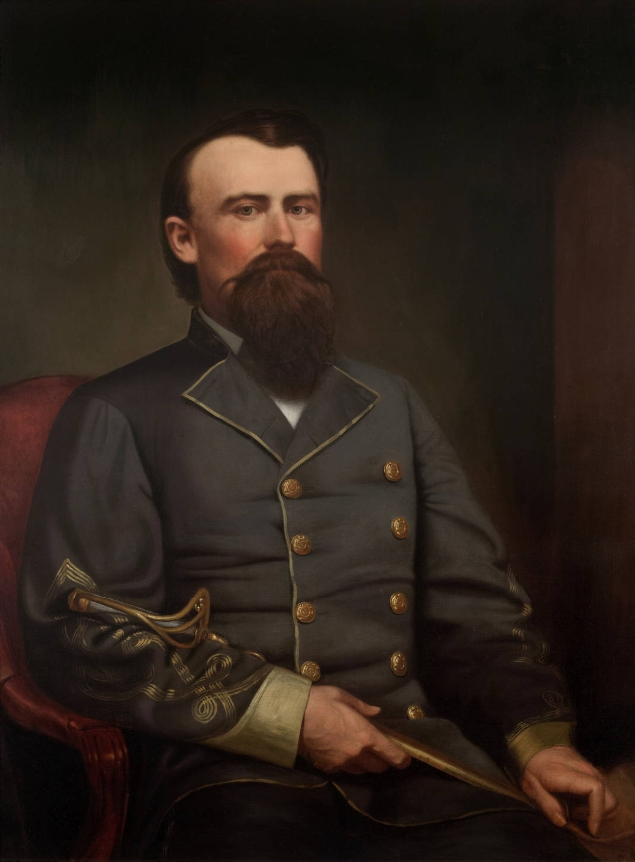
Portrait of Brigadier General Joseph O. Shelby by Edward Savage (State Historical Society of Missouri)

In 1864, Union General Frederick Steele's failure in the Camden Expedition of March 23 – May 2, 1864, was largely due to Shelby's brilliant and determined harassment, in concert with other Confederate forces. Steele's men were forced to retreat to Little Rock by the destruction or capture of their supply trains at the Battle of Marks' Mills. Reassigned to Clarendon, Arkansas, Shelby succeeded in capturing a Union tinclad (lightly armored) gunboat, the USS Queen City. The gunboat was burned to prevent her recapture. Shelby then commanded a division during Price's Missouri Expedition. He distinguished himself at the battles of Little Blue River and Westport, and briefly captured many towns from their Union garrisons, including Potosi, Boonville, Waverly, Stockton, Lexington, and California, Missouri.

After Robert E. Lee's army surrendered in Virginia in April 1865, General Edmund Kirby Smith appointed Shelby a major general on May 10. The promotion was never formalized, however, due to the collapse of the Confederate government. Shelby's adjutant at the time was John Newman Edwards, who years later (as editor of the Kansas City Times) was largely responsible for creating the legend of Jesse James and his fellow Confederate guerrillas.

== Later years ==
In June 1865, rather than surrender, Shelby and about 1,000 of his remaining troops rode south into Mexico. Reportedly, Shelby sank his battle flag in the Rio Grande near present-day Eagle Pass, Texas, on the way to Mexico rather than risk the flag falling into the hands of the Federals. The event is depicted in a painting displayed at the Eagle Pass City Hall. For their determination not to surrender, Shelby's men were immortalized as "the undefeated". A later verse appended to the postwar Confederate anthem "The Unreconstructed Rebel" commemorates the defiance of Shelby and his men:

I won't be reconstructed, I'm better now than then.
And for a Carpetbagger I do not give a damn.
So it's forward to the frontier, soon as I can go.
I'll fix me up a weapon and start for Mexico.

The plan was to offer their services to Emperor Maximilian as a "foreign legion". Maximilian declined to accept the ex-Confederates into his armed forces, but he did grant them land for the New Virginia Colony, an American settlement in Mexico near Córdoba, Veracruz. The grant was revoked two years later following the collapse of the empire and Maximilan's execution. The memory of Shelby and his men as "the Undefeated" is used as a basis for the 1969 John Wayne–Rock Hudson film by the same name.

Shelby returned to Missouri in 1867 and resumed farming. In 1883, Shelby was a critical witness for fellow ex-Confederate Frank James at James' trial. Shelby was appointed the U.S. marshal for the Western District of Missouri in 1893, and retained this position until his death. He appointed an African American to office, which led to "bitter feeling among some of his neighbors". Shelby defended his actions.

Shelby died of pneumonia at his farm near Adrian, Missouri, in 1897. He is buried in Kansas City in Forest Hill Calvary Cemetery. A Union general who had fought against Shelby, Alfred Pleasonton, remarked, "Shelby was the best cavalry general of the South. Under other conditions, he would have been one of the best in the world."

Shelby Park in Eagle Pass, Texas, was named after him. The pass is known as the "grave of the Confederacy". Shelby and his men buried their battle flags on the north bank of the Rio Grande before entering Mexico according to the famous Texas Ranger and cavalry officer Colonel Alexander Watkins Terrell, who was present at the crossing.

== Personal life ==
On July 22, 1857, Shelby married Elizabeth Nancy Shelby (daughter of his first cousin), in a grand steamboat wedding and honeymoon trip to St. Louis. Known as Betty (or Betsy), she was much younger than he.

== See also ==
- List of American Civil War generals
- List of people from Lexington, Kentucky
