= Tobin Township, Scotland County, Missouri =

Township in Scotland County, Missouri, U.S.

Coordinates: 40.3408°N 92.2042°W

Tobin Township is an inactive township in Scotland County, in the U.S. state of Missouri.

Tobin Township was erected in 1890, taking its name from Tobin Creek.
