= South Gorin, Missouri =

- City
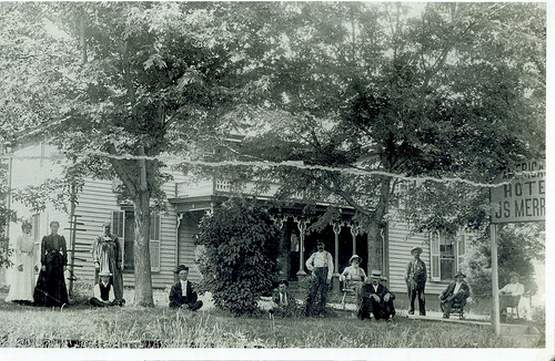
- The American Hotel, one of two in Gorin. Circa 1900.

- Location of South Gorin, Missouri
- Coordinates: 40°21′35″N 92°01′28″W
- Country: United States
- State: Missouri
- County: Scotland
- Established: 1886

Area
  - Total: 0.20 sq mi (0.53 km^{2})
  - Land: 0.20 sq mi (0.53 km^{2})
  - Water: 0 sq mi (0.00 km^{2})
- Elevation: 702 ft (214 m)

Population (2020)
  - Total: 62
  - Density: 305.7/sq mi (118.05/km^{2})
- Time zone: UTC-6 (Central (CST))
  - Summer (DST): UTC-5 (CDT)
- FIPS code: 29-68870
- GNIS feature ID: 2397666

South Gorin is a city located in Scotland County, Missouri, United States. As of the 2020 census, its population was 62. The original name of the city was simply "Gorin", and it was changed. The official name for the post office in South Gorin is still Gorin.

== History ==
Gorin was founded in 1857 and is named for Reverend M.G. Gorin and Major J.H.M. Gorin, both early settlers to the area. The town primarily owes its growth to the Atchison, Topeka & Santa Fe Railroad, which was finishing construction in the area in the 1880s. A depot was built in the fledgling town, which began to experience steady growth. By 1913 it had grown to be Scotland County's second-largest town. The business community featured two banks, two hotels, multiple grocery drug, and hardware stores along with restaurants, a farm implement dealer and factory manufacturing wagons and buggies. A weekly newspaper, the Gorin Argus was also published for several years. The Prairie Oil & Gas Company, a division of Standard Oil, built a pumping station for their cross-country pipeline also. A new school building was built in Gorin in 1907 for elementary through tenth grade students and continued in use for many decades before consolidation with the Scotland County R-1 school district.

== Geography ==
South Gorin is located in southeast Scotland County at the intersection of Missouri Routes A and U approximately two miles northeast of the North Fabius River. Memphis lies ten miles to the northwest, Rutledge is 4.5 miles to the southwest and Wyaconda is five miles to the northeast in adjacent Clark County. The Atchison, Topeka and Santa Fe Railroad passes through the town.

According to the United States Census Bureau, the city has a total area of 0.20 square miles (0.52 km^{2}), all land.

== Demographics ==
Gorin Historical population
Census	Pop.	Note	%±
1900	319		—
1910	746		133.9%
1920	426		−42.9%
1930	388		−8.9%
1940	314		−19.1%
1950	303		−3.5%
1960	279		−7.9%
1970	220		−21.1%
1980	212		−3.6%
1990	130		−38.7%
2000	143		10.0%
2010	91		−36.4%
2020	62		−31.9%
U.S. Decennial Census

South Gorin Historical population
Census	Pop.	Note	%±
1900	87		—
1910	84		−3.4%
Missouri Census Data Center

=== 2010 census ===
As of the census of 2010, there were 91 people, 44 households, and 25 families residing in the city. The population density was 455.0 inhabitants per square mile (175.7/km^{2}). There were 65 housing units at an average density of 325.0 per square mile (125.5/km^{2}). The racial makeup of the city was 100.0% White.

There were 44 households, of which 18.2% had children under the age of 18 living with them, 36.4% were married couples living together, 13.6% had a female householder with no husband present, 6.8% had a male householder with no wife present, and 43.2% were non-families. 40.9% of all households were made up of individuals, and 15.9% had someone living alone who was 65 years of age or older. The average household size was 2.07 and the average family size was 2.80.

The median age in the city was 50.3 years. 15.4% of residents were under the age of 18; 12.1% were between the ages of 18 and 24; 15.4% were from 25 to 44; 30.8% were from 45 to 64; and 26.4% were 65 years of age or older. The gender makeup of the city was 52.7% male and 47.3% female.

=== 2000 census ===
As of the census of 2000, there were 143 people, 55 households and 32 families residing in the town. The population density was 711.0 inhabitants per square mile (274.5/km^{2}). There were 80 housing units at an average density of 397.8 per square mile (153.6/km^{2}). The racial makeup of the town was 99.30% White, 0.00% African American, 0.00% Native American, 0.70% Asian, 0.00% Pacific Islander, 0.00% from other races, and 0.00% from two or more races. 0.00% of the population were Hispanic or Latino of any race.

There were 55 households, out of which 38.2% had children under the age of 18 living with them, 49.1% were married couples living together, 7.3% had a female householder with no husband present, and 41.8% were non-families. 40.0% of all households were made up of individuals, and 27.3% had someone living alone who was 65 years of age or older. The average household size was 2.60 and the average family size was 3.53.

In the town the population was spread out, with 37.1% under the age of 18, 3.5% from 18 to 24, 28.0% from 25 to 44, 13.3% from 45 to 64, and 18.2% who were 65 years of age or older. The median age was 34 years. For every 100 females, there were 76.5 males. For every 100 females age 18 and over, there were 73.1 males.

The median income for a household in the town was $25,795, and the median income for a family was $27,500. Males had a median income of $29,375 versus $13,750 for females. The per capita income for the town was $16,365. 19.1% of the population and 14.7% of families were below the poverty line. Out of the total population, 25.7% of those under the age of 18 and 11.4% of those 65 and older were living below the poverty line.

== Transportation ==
Amtrak’s Southwest Chief, which operates between Los Angeles and Chicago, passes through the town on BNSF tracks, but makes no stop. The nearest station is located in La Plata, 49 miles (79 km) to the southwest.

== Education ==
It is in the Scotland County R-I School District.

Previously it was in an elementary school district, Gorin R-III School District. The Gorin district closed on July 1, 2015 and consolidated into the Scotland County R-1 district.

== Notable people ==
- Ella Ewing Known as "The Missouri Giantess"; world's tallest woman in her era and lived in the Gorin area until her death in 1913.
- Sedona Schnebly (1877 - 1950)- The City of Sedona, Arizona was named after her.
