= David Moore (military officer) =

American politician (1817–1893)

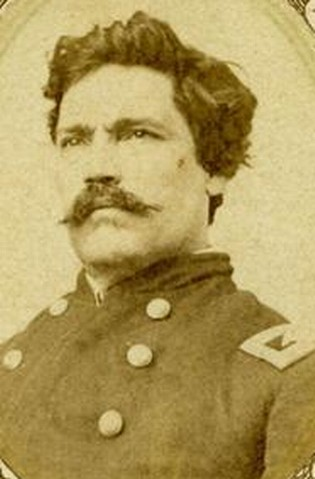
- Born: July 3, 1817; Columbiana County, Ohio, US
- Died: July 19, 1893 (aged 76); St. Louis, Missouri, US
- Burial place: Forest Grove Cemetery, Canton, Missouri
- Military career
- Allegiance: United States of America; Union
- Branch: United States Army; Union Army
- Service years: 1847–1848; 1861–1865
- Rank: Colonel; Bvt. Brigadier General
- Unit: 3rd Regiment of Ohio Volunteers
- Commands: 1st Northeast Missouri Home Guards; 21st Missouri Infantry Regiment; 51st Missouri Infantry Regiment
- Conflicts: Mexican–American War; American Civil War; Battle of Athens; Battle of Shiloh; Siege of Corinth; Battle of Iuka; Battle of Corinth; Vicksburg Campaign
- Other work: politician

David Moore (July 3, 1817 – July 19, 1893) was an American military officer who served in the Mexican–American War and the American Civil War. He attained the rank of brevet Brigadier General, United States Volunteers before leaving military service. Later he would serve as a member of the Missouri General Assembly.

== Early life ==
David Moore was born in Columbiana County, Ohio, on July 3, 1817, to John and Sarah (Clark) Moore. His father John Moore, an Irish immigrant, served in the War of 1812 and moved to Ohio shortly thereafter. David had two siblings—a sister and a brother—plus several half-siblings from his widowed father's first marriage. At the age of thirteen Moore moved to Wayne County, Ohio, and became a carpenter's apprentice until he was eighteen. He continued in the trade until 1847 when he participated in the Mexican–American War as Captain of an Ohio unit known as the Wooster Guards, which became Company "E" of the 3rd Ohio Infantry Regiment. After returning from the war, he moved to Missouri in 1850 and took up farming as an occupation as well as small-town merchant.

== The Civil War ==
At the outbreak of the war Moore was living in the small northeast Missouri village of Wrightsville. It was there his friend (and future Missouri State Treasurer) Colonel William Bishop, on orders from General Nathaniel Lyon, recruited him to organize a unit of Missouri Home Guards to protect the area from Confederate raiders. Dressed in his Mexican–American War uniform, David Moore rode into Alexandria, Missouri, on June 24, 1861, to take the oath of loyalty to the Union. Given the rank of captain, he had handbills printed the same day inviting "all who are willing to fight for their homes, their county, and the flag of our glorious Union" to enlist "bringing their arms and ammunition." A sufficient number of men had been recruited from the Clark County, Missouri, area within two weeks and on July 4, 1861, in Kahoka they were officially organized as the 1st Northeast Missouri Home Guards, Moore being elected the unit's colonel.

After the swearing in and organization, Moore and about five hundred men moved from Kahoka to the strategically important river port of Athens, Missouri. Also in Clark county and not far from the confluence of the Des Moines and Mississippi Rivers, Moore established a training camp there as well as used it as a base of operations against area pro-Confederate bushwhackers and Missouri State Guard (MSG) under Colonel Martin E. Green. Athens also had the advantage of being across-river from a Union army supply depot at Croton, Iowa and its railroad access. On July 21, 1861, Moore's troops, with assistance from Illinois and Iowa units, attacked the village of Etna in next-door Scotland County, Missouri, and drove off elements of MSG cavalry then retreated back to fortified Athens.

=== Battle of Athens ===
In response to the action of July 21, MSG Colonel Green broke camp at his Fabius River training base and marched toward Athens, stopping long enough to rout a small Home Guard force at Edina, Knox County, Missouri, on July 31, 1861. On August 5, 1861, Green's force of 2,000 MSG—among them two of Moore's sons—with three cannon attacked Athens. Moore had something around 500 troops under his command but they were better armed, with a recently arrived shipment of Springfield rifles. Despite being outnumbered four-to-one, the pro-Union Home Guards were able to withstand the initial attack. Seeing the MSG faltering, Colonel Moore led a bayonet charge that sent the enemy scattering. Soon, reinforcements from Croton, Farmington, Iowa, and Keokuk, Iowa, across the river to help complete the rout. Green's men suffered losses estimated as anywhere between thirty and fifty dead and an unknown number of wounded, while the Home Guard reported only three dead and twenty wounded. Moore's forces also captured 450 horses, assorted small arms, and MSG cannons.

=== The 21st Missouri ===
Colonel Moore's 1st Missouri Home Guards, along with Colonel Humphrey Woodyard's 2nd Missouri Home Guards continued to pursue Confederate elements in the late summer and fall after the Battle of Athens. On December 31, 1861, the two were combined to form the 21st Missouri Volunteer Infantry Regiment. The following March, after being augmented with further units from Iowa and Illinois, the unit was assigned to the command of General Ulysses S. Grant. On April 6, 1862, Moore was wounded while participating in the early actions of the Battle of Shiloh. While leading his men from the front Moore was struck by three bullets. This caused the loss of his right leg below the knee, but after three months recovery he would return to command in early July, 1862. His return was fortuitous, because the next month disgruntled members of the 21st made a half-hearted attempt at mutiny. Moore responded quickly and forcefully, arresting all and court martialed the six ringleaders. All further thoughts of mutiny or mass desertion were quashed among the 21st soldiers.

The 21st Missouri returned to heavy combat action in Fall, 1862, participating in the Battle of Iuka on September 19 and the Second Battle of Corinth on October 3–4. Moore and his regiment wrapped up their busy 1862 by participating in the first phase of General Grant's Vicksburg Campaign in December. Nearly all of 1863 was spent in garrison duty, protecting Union supply lines and strategic towns like Columbus, Kentucky, and the Tennessee towns of Union City, Clinton, and Memphis. The year 1864 would see the men of the 21st once again assigned to hard fighting as they served in the Third Division of the Union XVI Corps participating in the Meridian Expedition, Red River Campaign and, especially, the Battle of Tupelo, where Moore and his men were noted for their fierce stand against the dismounted cavalry of Nathan Bedford Forrest. The regiment would also return home to Missouri briefly in 1864 in response to Price's Raid, pursuing Confederate General Sterling Price across Missouri and neighboring Arkansas.

David Moore and the 21st would begin 1865 with more garrison duty, but their commander would not remain with them for long. Moore left the regiment in early February, almost three years to the day of its organization. On February 21, 1865, Moore was brevetted to the rank of Brigadier General and set about organizing another regiment, the 51st Missouri. In May he assumed command of the 51st along with the First Military District of Missouri, based in St. Louis. The war now over, he remained in command until mustering out of the service on August 31, 1865.

== Life after the military ==
General Moore returned to northeast Missouri following the war's conclusion and again set about engaging in farming activities and the mercantile business in Canton, Missouri. In 1869 he was again called to public service, being elected as a Liberal Republican to a four-year term representing Missouri's 12th District in the Missouri State Senate. Post-war, Moore was also quite active in the Grand Army of the Republic (GAR), and became a Master Mason. In addition to raising crops, David Moore was raising a second family after the war. His first wife, Pennsylvania native Diademia (Schnabel) Moore, died in 1865 after bearing him five sons and a daughter: William W., Eugene, John C., Charles A, Thomas, and Frankie. As previously written, two of Moore's sons fought for the Missouri State Guard against him at Athens. David Moore's second wife, the widow May (Mattingly) Carnegy of Union County, Kentucky, bore him three daughters—Katie (deceased in childhood), Katie D., and Nellie—and also brought two step-sons and four step-daughters to the marriage. Moore continued to be somewhat active in Missouri Republican politics until his death on July 19, 1893.

== See also ==
- List of American Civil War brevet generals
