= Dancing Rabbit =

Dancing Rabbit may refer to:

- Dancing Rabbit Ecovillage, an intentional community near Rutledge, Missouri
- The Treaty of Dancing Rabbit Creek, the treaty between the United States and the Choctaw, forcing the removal of Choctaw from their lands east of the Mississippi River
