= Granger, Missouri =

- Village
- Location of Granger, Missouri
- Coordinates: 40°28′01″N 91°58′25″W
- Country: United States
- State: Missouri
- County: Scotland

Area
  - Total: 0.16 sq mi (0.41 km^{2})
  - Land: 0.16 sq mi (0.41 km^{2})
  - Water: 0 sq mi (0.00 km^{2})
- Elevation: 755 ft (230 m)

Population (2020)
  - Total: 22
  - Density: 138.6/sq mi (53.51/km^{2})
- Time zone: UTC-6 (Central (CST))
  - Summer (DST): UTC-5 (CDT)
- ZIP code: 63442
- Area code: 660
- FIPS code: 29-28360
- GNIS feature ID: 2398190

Granger is a village in Scotland County, Missouri, United States. As of the 2020 census, its population was 22.

== History ==
The town was laid out and surveyed by Henry Hill in September 1874. Its name pays homage to the Grange Movement, popular in rural America at that time. Granger was incorporated by petition to the Scotland county court on July 3, 1912. Adjacent to the Burlington Northern Railroad, Granger's business district at the time of incorporation included three general stores, two hotels, a bank, drug store, hardware store, grocer, meat market barber shop, livery, and blacksmith. Although no official census was taken of the community in 1910, contemporary estimates place the population at between 150 and 200 residents.

== Geography ==
According to the United States Census Bureau, the village has a total area of 0.16 square miles (0.41 km^{2}), all land.

== Demographics ==
Historical population
Census	Pop.	Note	%±
1880	47		—
1920	189		—
1930	142		−24.9%
1940	180		26.8%
1950	122		−32.2%
1960	146		19.7%
1970	105		−28.1%
1980	91		−13.3%
1990	63		−30.8%
2000	44		−30.2%
2010	34		−22.7%
2020	22		−35.3%
U.S. Decennial Census

=== 2010 census ===
As of the census of 2010, there were 34 people, 16 households, and 9 families living in the village. The population density was 212.5 inhabitants per square mile (82.0/km^{2}). There were 26 housing units at an average density of 162.5 per square mile (62.7/km^{2}). The racial makeup of the village was 100.0% White.

There were 16 households, of which 18.8% had children under the age of 18 living with them, 50.0% were married couples living together, 6.3% had a female householder with no husband present, and 43.8% were non-families. 43.8% of all households were made up of individuals, and 18.8% had someone living alone who was 65 years of age or older. The average household size was 2.13 and the average family size was 3.00.

The median age in the village was 48 years. 14.7% of residents were under the age of 18; 11.8% were between the ages of 18 and 24; 14.7% were from 25 to 44; 35.2% were from 45 to 64; and 23.5% were 65 years of age or older. The gender makeup of the village was 47.1% male and 52.9% female.

=== 2000 census ===
As of the census of 2000, there were 44 people, 22 households, and 10 families living in the village. The population density was 280.5 inhabitants per square mile (108.3/km^{2}). There were 26 housing units at an average density of 165.8 per square mile (64.0/km^{2}). The racial makeup of the village was 100.00% White.

There were 22 households, out of which 22.7% had children under the age of 18 living with them, 27.3% were married couples living together, 13.6% had a female householder with no husband present, and 54.5% were non-families. 54.5% of all households were made up of individuals, and 27.3% had someone living alone who was 65 years of age or older. The average household size was 2.00 and the average family size was 3.20.

In the village, the population was spread out, with 22.7% under the age of 18, 6.8% from 18 to 24, 25.0% from 25 to 44, 27.3% from 45 to 64, and 18.2% who were 65 years of age or older. The median age was 40 years. For every 100 females, there were 91.3 males. For every 100 females age 18 and over, there were 88.9 males.

The median income for a household in the village was $20,417, and the median income for a family was $31,250. Males had a median income of $19,583 versus $14,063 for females. The per capita income for the village was $12,400. There were no families and 14.9% of the population living below the poverty line, including no under eighteens and 20.0% of those over 64.

== Education ==
It is in the Scotland County R-I School District.
