= Energy, Missouri =

Unincorporated community in Missouri, U.S.

Coordinates: 40°24′15″N 92°20′45″W

Energy is an unincorporated community in Scotland County, in the U.S. state of Missouri.

== History ==
A post office called Energy was established in 1893, and remained in operation until 1904. Besides the post office, Energy had a country store.
