= Unity, Missouri =

Unincorporated community in Missouri, U.S.

Coordinates: 40.39115°N 92.25574°W

Unity is an unincorporated community in Scotland County, in the U.S. state of Missouri.

== History ==
A post office called Unity was established in 1857, and remained in operation until 1907. The community most likely was named after nearby Unity Cumberland Presbyterian Church.
