= Rutledge, Missouri =

- Village
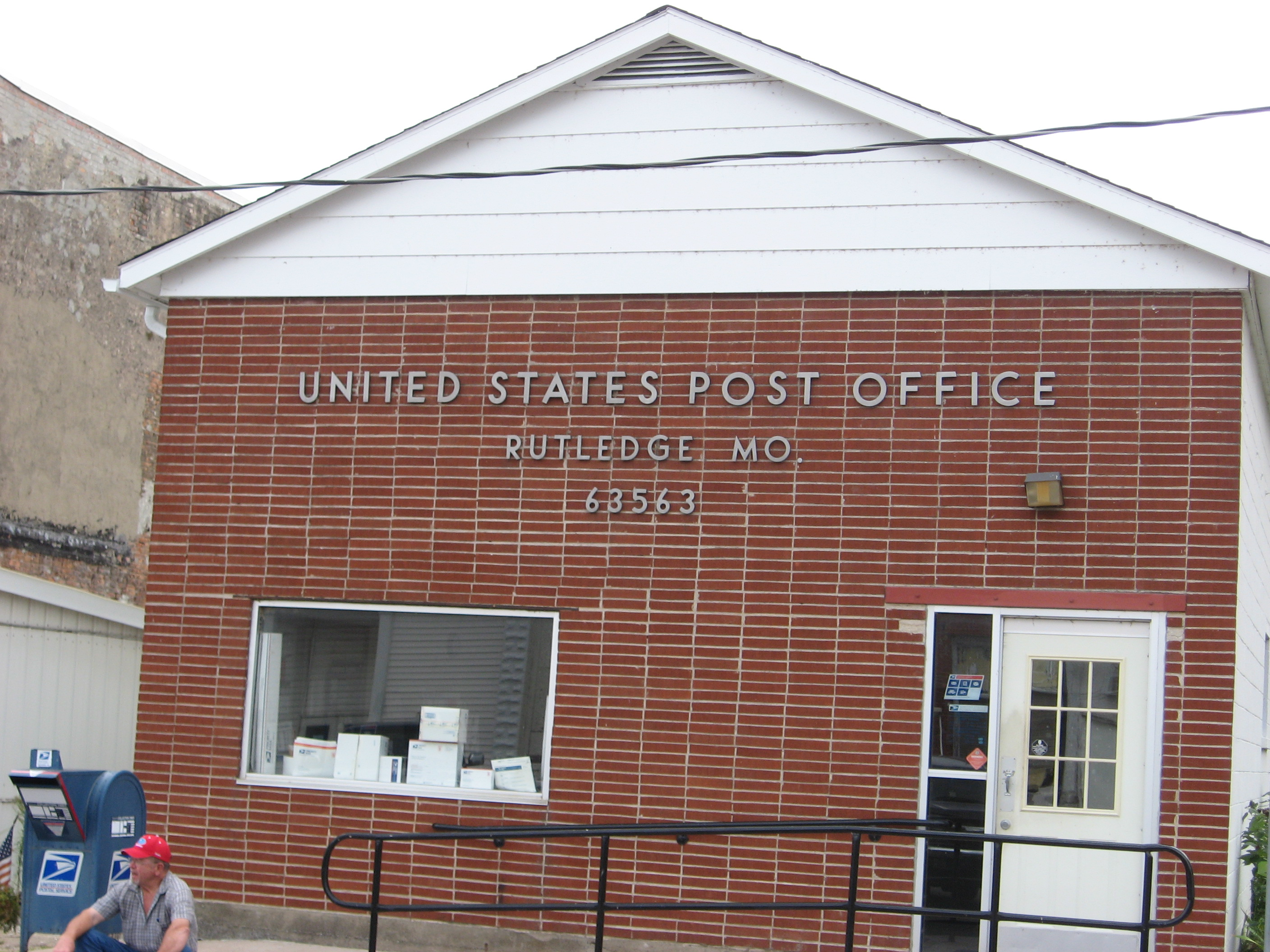
- Post office

- Location of Rutledge, Missouri
- Coordinates: 40°18′50″N 92°5′15″W
- Country: United States
- State: Missouri
- County: Scotland

Area
  - Total: 0.13 sq mi (0.34 km^{2})
  - Land: 0.13 sq mi (0.34 km^{2})
  - Water: 0 sq mi (0.00 km^{2})
- Elevation: 768 ft (234 m)

Population (2020)
  - Total: 86
  - Density: 647.9/sq mi (250.17/km^{2})
- Time zone: UTC-6 (Central (CST))
  - Summer (DST): UTC-5 (CDT)
- ZIP code: 63563
- Area code: 660
- FIPS code: 29-63776
- GNIS feature ID: 2396896

Rutledge is a village in Scotland County, Missouri, United States. As of the 2020 census, its population was 86.

The surrounding area is also the home to three intentional communities: Dancing Rabbit Ecovillage, a growing ecovillage on 280 acres (1.1 km^{2}) of rolling land, Sandhill Farm in unincorporated Sand Hill, Missouri, and Red Earth Farms.

A post office called Rutledge has been in operation since 1888. The community has the name of one Mr. Rutledge, a land agent.

== Geography ==
According to the United States Census Bureau, the village has a total area of 0.13 square miles (0.34 km^{2}), all land.

== Demographics ==
Historical population
Census	Pop.	Note	%±
1900	292		—
1910	418		43.2%
1920	283		−32.3%
1930	260		−8.1%
1940	249		−4.2%
1950	217		−12.9%
1960	158		−27.2%
1970	139		−12.0%
1980	128		−7.9%
1990	74		−42.2%
2000	103		39.2%
2010	109		5.8%
2020	86		−21.1%
U.S. Decennial Census

=== 2010 census ===
As of the census of 2010, there were 109 people, 38 households, and 23 families residing in the village. The population density was 838.5 inhabitants per square mile (323.7/km^{2}). There were 69 housing units at an average density of 530.8 per square mile (204.9/km^{2}). The racial makeup of the village was 100.0% White. Hispanic or Latino of any race were 0.9% of the population.

There were 38 households, of which 31.6% had children under the age of 18 living with them, 60.5% were married couples living together, and 39.5% were non-families. 31.6% of all households were made up of individuals, and 15.8% had someone living alone who was 65 years of age or older. The average household size was 2.87 and the average family size was 3.83.

The median age in the village was 33.5 years. 35.8% of residents were under the age of 18; 2.7% were between the ages of 18 and 24; 23.9% were from 25 to 44; 17.4% were from 45 to 64; and 20.2% were 65 years of age or older. The gender makeup of the village was 45.0% male and 55.0% female.

=== 2000 census ===
As of the census of 2000, there were 103 people, 41 households, and 25 families residing in the town. The population density was 797.0 inhabitants per square mile (307.7/km^{2}). There were 72 housing units at an average density of 557.2 per square mile (215.1/km^{2}). The racial makeup of the town was 100.00% White.

There were 41 households, out of which 26.8% had children under the age of 18 living with them, 48.8% were married couples living together, 12.2% had a female householder with no husband present, and 36.6% were non-families. 36.6% of all households were made up of individuals, and 17.1% had someone living alone who was 65 years of age or older. The average household size was 2.51 and the average family size was 3.38.

In the town the population was spread out, with 29.1% under the age of 18, 7.8% from 18 to 24, 23.3% from 25 to 44, 20.4% from 45 to 64, and 19.4% who were 65 years of age or older. The median age was 36 years. For every 100 females, there were 94.3 males. For every 100 females age 18 and over, there were 97.3 males.

The median income for a household in the town was $14,063, and the median income for a family was $17,500. Males had a median income of $11,667 versus $17,917 for females. The per capita income for the town was $9,545. There were 25.0% of families and 43.8% of the population living below the poverty line, including 93.8% of under eighteens and 13.6% of those over 64.

== Transportation ==
Amtrak’s Southwest Chief, which operates between Los Angeles and Chicago, passes through the town on BNSF tracks, but makes no stop. The nearest station is located in La Plata, 43 miles (69 km) to the southwest.

== Education ==
It is in the Scotland County R-I School District.
