= Middle Fabius, Missouri =

Unincorporated community in Missouri, U.S.

Coordinates: 40°27′18″N 92°19′08″W

Middle Fabius is an unincorporated community in Scotland County, in the U.S. state of Missouri.

== History ==
A post office called Middle Fabius was established in 1841, and remained in operation until 1890. The community takes its name from the nearby Middle Fabius River.
