= Ella Ewing =

Considered the Tallest woman of her time, "Missouri Giantess"

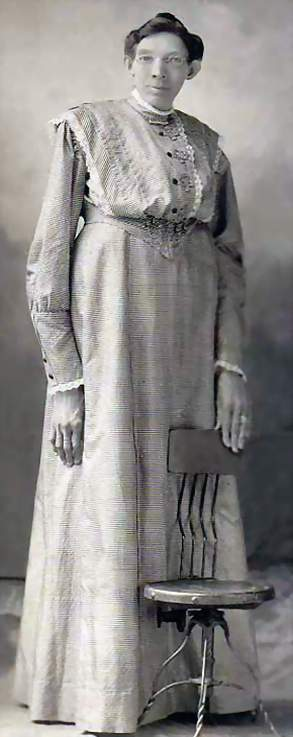
- Ella Ewing, "The Missouri Giantess"
- Born: Ella Katherine Ewing; March 9, 1872; La Grange, Missouri, United States
- Died: January 10, 1913 (aged 40); Gorin, Missouri, United States
- Other name: "The Missouri Giantess"
- Occupation: Circus sideshow attraction
- Height: 2.54 m (8 ft 4 in)

Ella Katherine "Kate" Ewing (March 9, 1872 – January 10, 1913) was a Missouri woman considered the world's tallest female of her era. She would use her great height to earn a living as a sideshow attraction, popularly known as "The Missouri Giantess."

== Early life ==
Ella Ewing was born in La Grange, Missouri, the only child of Benjamin F. and Anna Eliza (Herring) Ewing. While a toddler, Ella's family moved to the small Scotland County community of Rainbow, southeast of Gorin, Missouri. She was of normal size while a baby and young child, with the first signs of any abnormality appearing shortly after her seventh birthday. At age fourteen she towered over not only other children, but her parents and other adults, measuring 6 feet 10 inches. The people of the Rainbow and Gorin area were used to her fast growth and met it with compassion; however, in 1885 Ewing learned that would not always be the case in the world at large. Asked to read the Declaration of Independence at a July 4 celebration in Wyaconda, Missouri, Ewing was met with shocked gasps, snickers and laughter when she stood to read. Led away in tears, the incident would have a profound effect on her life.

== Medical condition ==
Although Ewing was born at an average size, she began growing unusually quickly shortly after her seventh birthday. By the age of 14, she stood 6 feet 10 inches (2.08 m) tall, and she continued growing into early adulthood.

Published estimates of Ewing's adult height vary. According to the journal kept by her mother, Anna Ewing, she stopped growing at the age of 22 after reaching 2.54 m (8 ft 4 in). Historian Barbara Chasteen repeated this figure in her 1977 biography of Ewing. Guinness World Records has listed her at 7 feet 4.5 inches (2.25 m) and stated that she may have reached 8 feet 3/4 inch (2.46 m). Because her height was never conclusively documented, Ewing is not recognized by Guinness World Records as the tallest woman in history.

Although Ewing was never formally diagnosed during her lifetime, modern writers generally attribute her extraordinary growth to pituitary gigantism. As she grew, her arms became unusually long, and her hands and feet grew exceptionally large. She wore custom-made U.S. size 24 shoes and often wore several rings on her fingers to make their unusual length less noticeable.

== Career ==
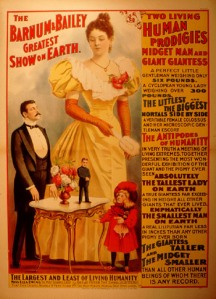
Circus poster promoting Ella Ewing.

Ewing initially resisted exhibiting herself in public. She eventually concluded that if people were going to stare, she might as well earn a living from it. Her Baptist faith remained central to her life, and throughout her career she refused to appear on Sundays. In 1892, at the age of 20, Ewing began her professional career when Chicago showman and museum owner Lewis Epstein offered her $1,000 for a 27-day engagement at his museum. The agreement allowed her parents, Benjamin and Anna Ewing, to accompany her, and the family treated the trip as both work and a vacation, visiting Chicago when she was not on display. After returning to Gorin, Missouri, Epstein offered her a second contract worth $5,000 for a five-month engagement, a sum her father believed would have taken him several years to earn through farming. Accepting the offer marked the beginning of her full-time career as a sideshow performer.

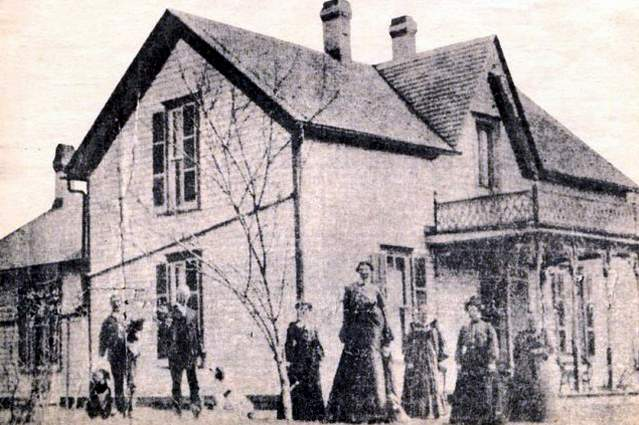
The custom built home of Ella Ewing featuring extra tall doorways, ceilings, and windows to better accommodate her height.

For the next two decades, Ewing toured with museums, fairs, and circus exhibitions throughout the United States. She was promoted as the "Missouri Giantess" and, for a time, by Ringling Bros. and Barnum & Bailey Circus as the "Tallest Woman on Earth". Away from the platform, contemporary accounts described Ewing as "handy with her needle" and fond of music.

The income from her exhibitions allowed Ewing to support her parents financially, purchase a 120-acre (49 ha) farm near Gorin, and build a custom-designed home with extra-high ceilings, doors, and windows to accommodate her stature. Her travels also exposed her to places she otherwise would not have seen and broadened her education. By the early 1910s, declining health gradually forced her to reduce her public appearances.

== Death ==
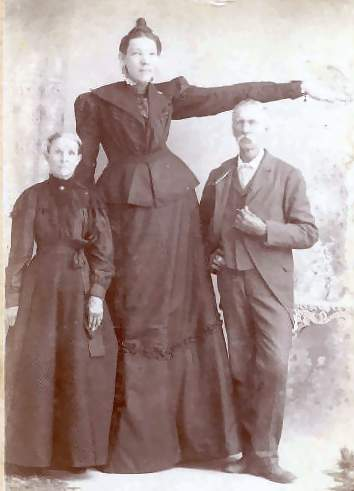
"The Missouri Giantess", Ella Ewing with her parents Benjamin and Anna Ewing.

By the early 1910s, Ewing's health had declined. She died at her home near Gorin, Missouri, on January 10, 1913, at the age of 40 from tuberculosis and pneumonia.

Ewing requested that she be cremated because she feared her body would become the object of scientific examination or public curiosity after her death. Her father, Benjamin Ewing, instead chose a traditional burial.

Because no commercially manufactured casket was large enough, undertaker Frederick Gerth commissioned a custom-built casket and matching burial vault. A horse-drawn hearse was also modified to accommodate the unusually long casket.

Three days later, on January 13, 1913, large crowds attended Ewing's funeral despite a severe winter storm, and ten pallbearers were needed to carry the casket. She was buried at Harmony Grove Baptist Church Cemetery near Gorin in the sealed burial vault, which was lined with concrete to discourage grave robbing.

== Legacy ==
In Scotland County, Missouri there is an "Ella Ewing Reservoir" for fishing and an arts festival in Memphis, Missouri was also named for her.

== See also ==
- Ella Abomah Williams
