= Frank C. Bostock =

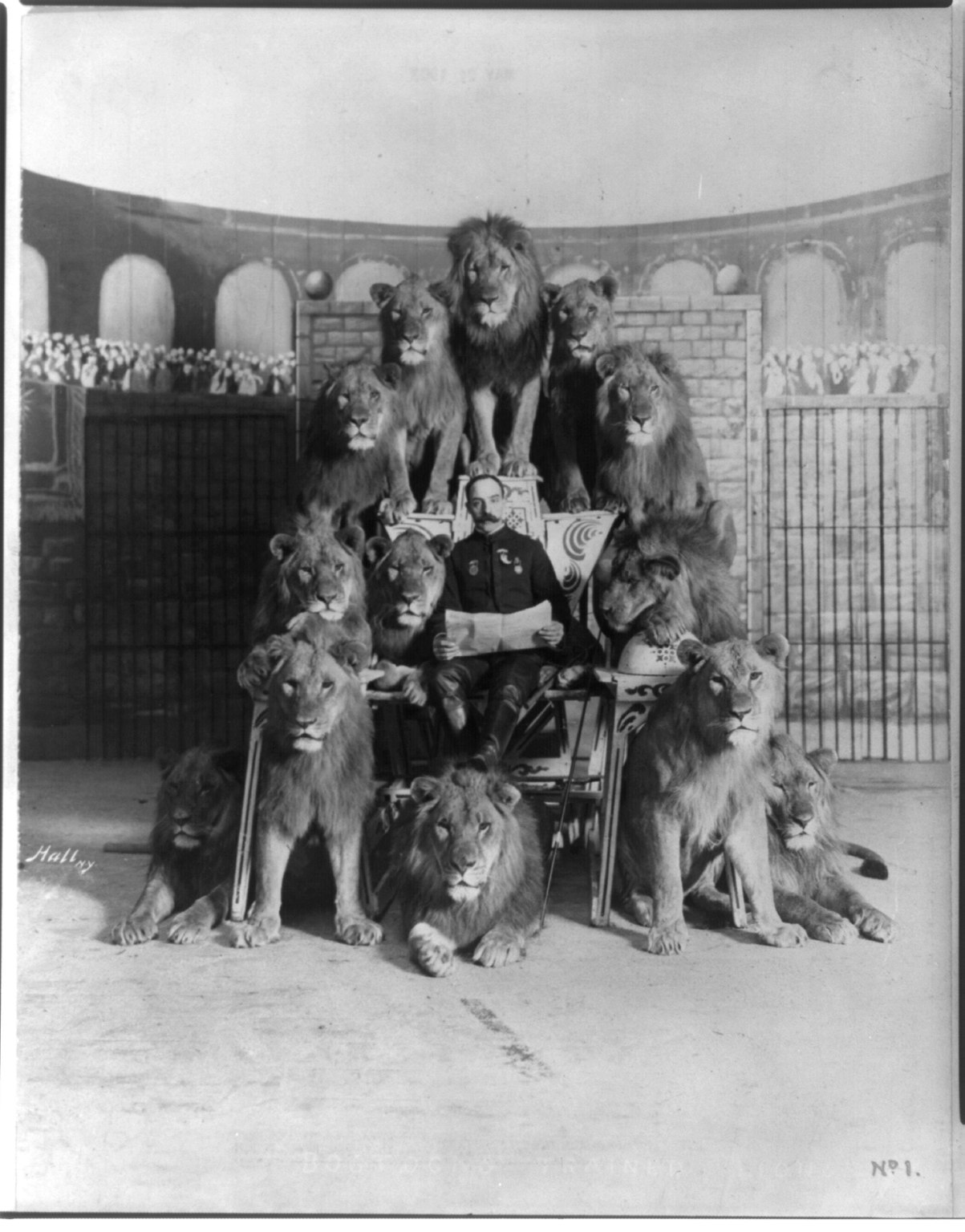
Bostock with his lions, 1903

Francis Charles Bostock (1866–1912) was an English entrepreneur and animal trainer, who represented the touring section of the Bostock and Wombwell Menagerie. He toured Europe and America and in the latter he was known as "The Animal King". At death he was called "England's Greatest Showman".

== Life ==
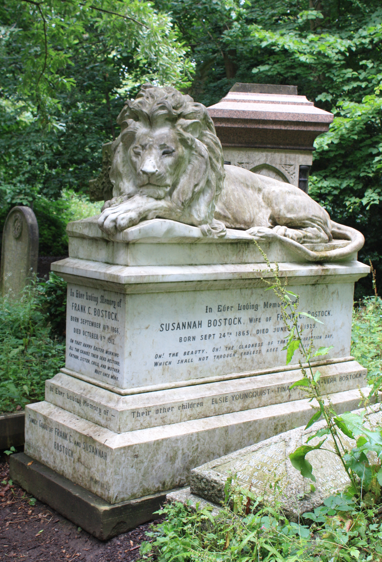
The grave of Frank C. Bostock, Abney Park Cemetery, London

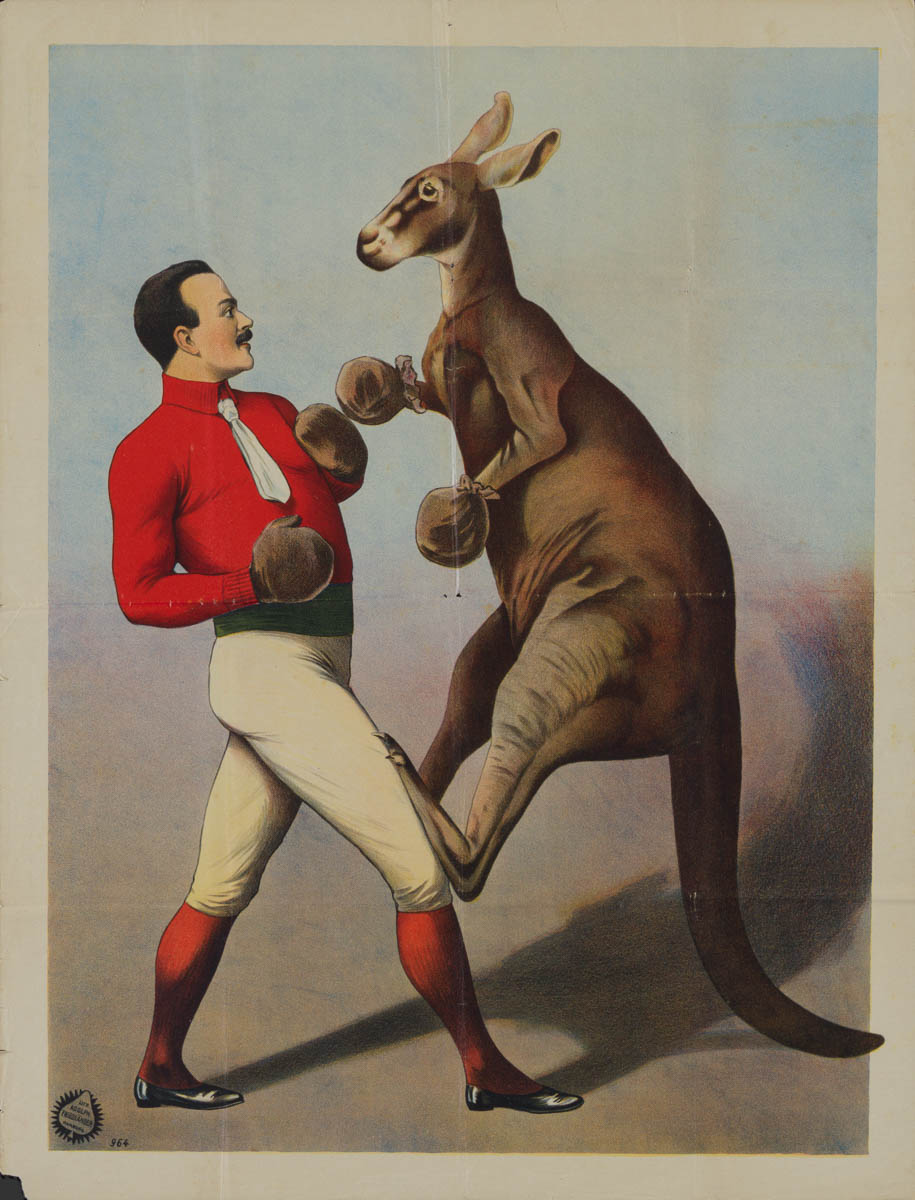
Boxing Kangaroo sideshow poster

Bostock was born on 10 September 1866, the seventh child of James William Bostock (1814-1878) and his wife Emma Wombwell (1834-1904, granddaughter of George Wombwell). His father had left his father's farm in Horton, Staffordshire in 1832 when his father remarried and James had joined Wombwell's Travelling Menagerie as a wagoner and animal handler in 1838. He then became the menagerie's agent, obtaining Royal Command Performances at Windsor Castle in 1847 and 1854. His parents had married in 1852 when James was 38 and Emma was 18.

Wombwell's Menagerie had been bought by a Mrs Edmond on or before Wombwell's death in 1850. Bostock was born into this travelling show and his father detached himself from Mrs Edmonds in 1867 and set up "Bostock & Wombwell" (embracing his wife's surname and revitalising the well known name of Wombwell). When James died in 1878, Emma continued as manager and owner of the show. Bostock's older brother, Edward Henry Bostock, bought out the show in 1889.

Bostock set up his own show in 1889 and appears in Newcastle-upon-Tyne as "owner" of a travelling menagerie in the 1891 census. In 1893 he made his first trip to America, partnered with the Ferari Brothers, beginning with a semi-permanent show at Flatbush, Brooklyn. The show contained three lions and one of the first boxing kangaroos. From 1894 to 1903 he vied with Carl Hagenbeck for prime spots on Coney Island. Bostock averaged audiences of 16000 and Hagenbeck had "only" 8000.

On 12 April 1901, Bostock was seriously injured by Rajah, his Bengal tiger, while on tour in Indianapolis. The tiger had attacked and killed a young keeper called Nielsen a few weeks earlier. During his time in America, he befriended Theodore Roosevelt who gave Bostock a pet puma named Alice, who had become too big to handle.

Renowned mainly as a lion trainer, Bostock is credited with discovering that lions react oddly to chairs (due to their legs) and therefore a chair can be used to control a lion. In 1908 he introduced the "big cage" into circus acts. His escapades included capturing an escaped lion in the sewers of Birmingham. In 1908, back in England, he brought American Style razzamatazz to a show Bostock's Arena and Jungle at Earls Court. He toured the show in 1908, presented it in Sheffield. In America he had encountered the new craze of roller skating and was among the first to bring this type of show to Britain. In 1910 he was owner of the Sheffield Skating Rink and when the craze faded that year he converted the rink to house his Jungle show.

Bostock died at Kensington Mansions in the Earls Court district of London on 8 October 1912 and was buried at Abney Park Cemetery in London on 14 October. A unique tombstone featuring a sculpture of reclining lion was added the following year. The tomb echo the design of George Wombwell in Highgate Cemetery. At the time of Bostock's death he owned over 1000 animals and owned amusement parks in Europe, America, South Africa and Australia.

== Family ==
In 1887, Bostock married Susannah Ethel Bailey (1864-1929). They had six daughters and one son.

== In literature and popular culture ==
Neil Munro gives a satirical account of a marriage ceremony conducted in the lions' cage at Boston & Wombwell's Menagerie while it was based in New City Road, Glasgow, in his Erchie Macpherson story "A Menagerie Marriage", first published in the Glasgow Evening News of 18 April 1910.

== Publications ==
- The Training of Wild Animals (1903)
- Menageries, Circuses and Theatres (1927); memoir by Edward Henry Bostock

== See also ==
- Ella Abomah Williams
