= Tobin Creek =

Stream in the American state of Missouri

Coordinates: 40.327814°N 92.178516°W

Tobin Creek is a stream in Scotland County in the U.S. state of Missouri.

Tobin Creek has the name of George Tobin, a pioneer citizen.

== See also ==
- List of rivers of Missouri
