= Arbela, Missouri =

- Village
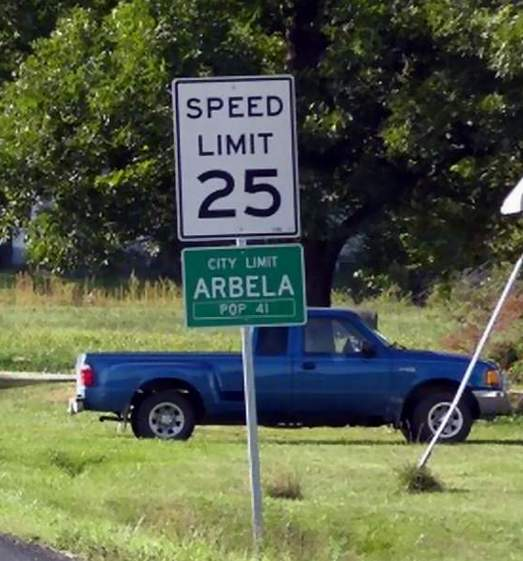
- City limits of Arbela, Missouri

- Location of Arbela, Missouri
- Coordinates: 40°27′47″N 92°0′56″W
- Country: United States
- State: Missouri
- County: Scotland

Area
  - Total: 0.089 sq mi (0.23 km^{2})
  - Land: 0.089 sq mi (0.23 km^{2})
  - Water: 0 sq mi (0.00 km^{2})
- Elevation: 679 ft (207 m)

Population (2020)
  - Total: 24
  - Density: 268.0/sq mi (103.49/km^{2})
- Time zone: UTC-6 (Central (CST))
  - Summer (DST): UTC-5 (CDT)
- ZIP codes: 63432, 63442
- Area code: 660
- FIPS code: 29-01576
- GNIS feature ID: 2397434

Arbela (/ɑːrˈbiːlə/ ar-BEE-lə) is a village in Scotland County, Missouri, United States. As of the 2020 census, its population was 24.

== History ==
Arbela was originally named "North Perryville", and under the latter name was platted in 1858. With the coming of the Keokuk & Western Railroad some years later, the town was resurveyed and the present name chosen. It was named for the Battle for Arbela in which Alexander the Great defeated the Persian Army.

== Geography ==
According to the United States Census Bureau, the village has a total area of 0.09 square miles (0.23 km^{2}), all land.

== Demographics ==
Historical population
Census	Pop.	Note	%±
1880	144		—
1890	122		−15.3%
1900	169		38.5%
1910	131		−22.5%
1920	121		−7.6%
1930	106		−12.4%
1940	90		−15.1%
1950	87		−3.3%
1960	70		−19.5%
1970	70		0.0%
1980	67		−4.3%
1990	40		−40.3%
2000	40		0.0%
2010	41		2.5%
2020	24		−41.5%
U.S. Decennial Census

=== 2010 census ===
As of the census of 2010, there were 41 people, 20 households, and 13 families living in the village. The population density was 455.6 inhabitants per square mile (175.9/km^{2}). There were 25 housing units at an average density of 277.8 per square mile (107.3/km^{2}). The racial makeup of the village was 97.6% White and 2.4% from other races. Hispanic or Latino of any race were 2.4% of the population.

There were 20 households, of which 20.0% had children under the age of 18 living with them, 50.0% were married couples living together, 15.0% had a female householder with no husband present, and 35.0% were non-families. 25.0% of all households were made up of individuals, and 5% had someone living alone who was 65 years of age or older. The average household size was 2.05 and the average family size was 2.23.

The median age in the village was 49.5 years. 17.1% of residents were under the age of 18; 0% were between the ages of 18 and 24; 24.4% were from 25 to 44; 39.1% were from 45 to 64; and 19.5% were 65 years of age or older. The gender makeup of the village was 46.3% male and 53.7% female.

=== 2000 census ===
As of the census of 2000, there were 40 people, 17 households, and 13 families living in the town. The population density was 451.1 inhabitants per square mile (174.2/km^{2}). There were 20 housing units at an average density of 225.6 per square mile (87.1/km^{2}). The racial makeup of the town was 100.00% White.

There were 17 households, out of which 29.4% had children under the age of 18 living with them, 47.1% were married couples living together, and 41.2% were non-families. 35.3% of all households were made up of individuals, and 5.9% had someone living alone who was 65 years of age or older. The average household size was 2.35 and the average family size was 2.90.

In the town the population was spread out, with 22.5% under the age of 18, 7.5% from 18 to 24, 37.5% from 25 to 44, 27.5% from 45 to 64, and 5.0% who were 65 years of age or older. The median age was 36 years. For every 100 females, there were 150.0 males. For every 100 females age 18 and over, there were 121.4 males.

The median income for a household in the town was $31,250, and the median income for a family was $36,250. Males had a median income of $21,667 versus $13,750 for females. The per capita income for the town was $12,853. None of the families and 33.5% of the population were living below the poverty line, including no under eighteens and none of those over 64.

== Education ==
It is in the Scotland County R-I School District.
