= Battle of Cole Camp =

Battle of the American Civil War

Coordinates: 38.426467°N 93.232501°W

- Part of the Trans-Mississippi Theater of the American Civil War
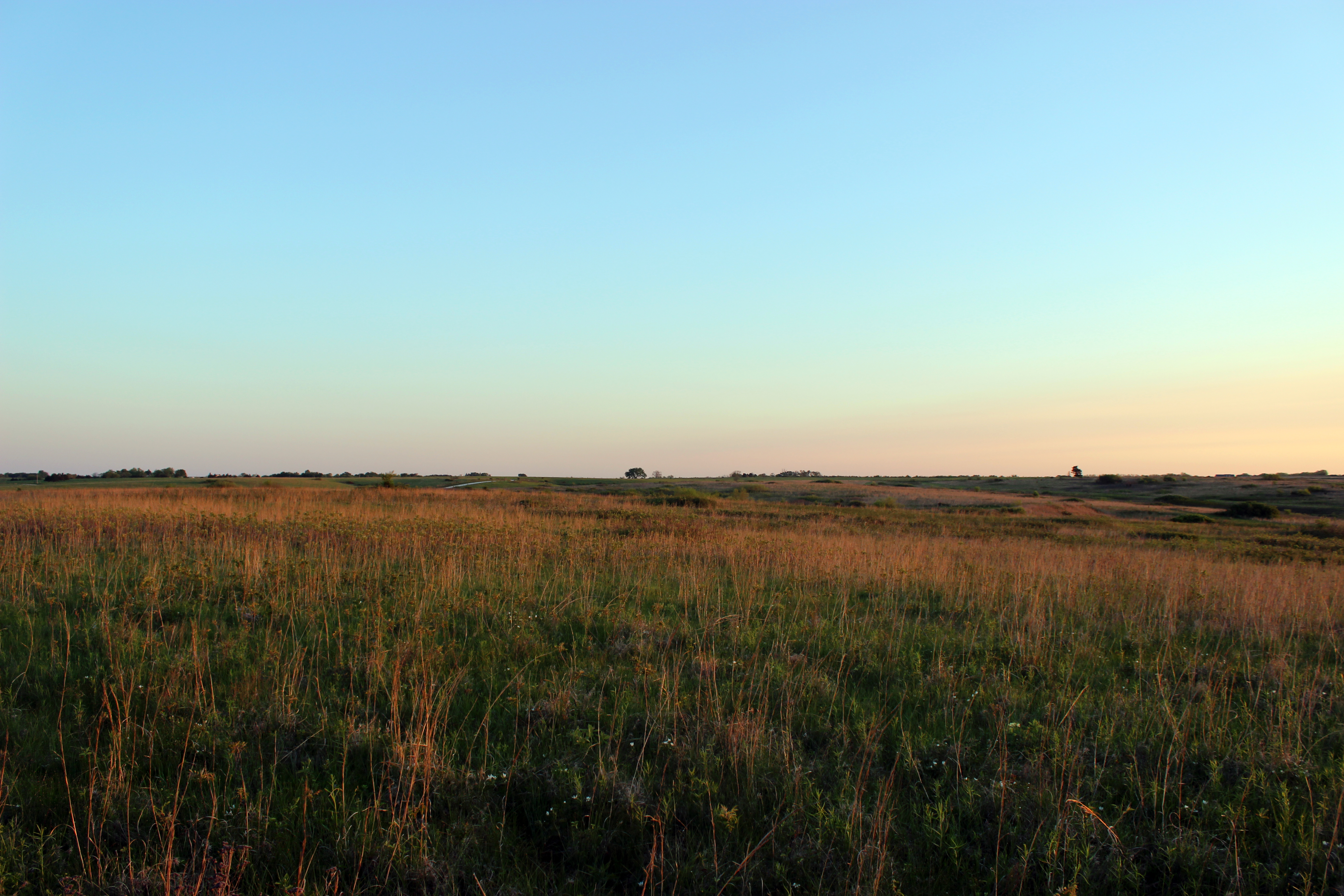
- Cole Camp in 2016
| Date | June 19, 1861 |
| Location | Benton County, Missouri |
| Result | Confederate victory |

Belligerents
| United States | Missouri (Confederate) |

Commanders and leaders
| (United States) Abel H. W. Cook | Walter Scott O'Kane |

Strength
| Benton County Home Guard (400–600) | O'Kane's Battalion Missouri State Guard (350) |

Casualties and losses
| 35 killed 60 wounded 25 captured | 7 killed 25 wounded |

The Battle of Cole Camp was a skirmish of the American Civil War, occurring on June 19, 1861, in Benton County, Missouri. The Union loss provided an open path for the fleeing governor and Missouri State Guard away from Lyon's force in Boonville.

== Background ==
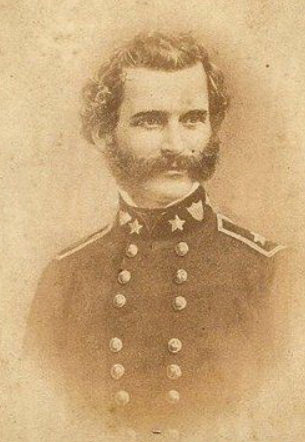
O'Kane in uniform

On June 15, 1861, Union Brigadier General Nathaniel Lyon took control of the Missouri capitol in Jefferson City. Two days later, he routed the portion of the Missouri State Guard then assembling at Boonville with pro-secession Missouri Governor Claiborne F. Jackson. As the portion of the guard accompanying Governor Jackson fled to the southwest of the state, a Union Home Guard regiment was in position to obstruct his retreat. The majority of the inhabitants of Benton County were of Southern origin and had pro-Confederate, pro-slavery sentiment; however, the German immigrants and their descendants were predominantly pro-Union and anti-slavery. These formed the core of the Benton County Home Guard. Captain Abel H. W. Cook began to form the regiment in early June and called for the volunteers to assemble northeast of Cole Camp on June 11.

A secessionist force was gathering nearby at Warsaw. Captain Walter Scott O'Kane organized the Warsaw "Grays" and Captain Thomas W. Murray organized the "Blues." The combined force numbered about 350, with 100 of them mounted. Two weeks after Cole Camp, just before the Battle of Carthage, O'Kane was elected lieutenant colonel of the battalion while Murray was elected major. The secessionists were aided by Benton County's Sheriff, Bartholomew W. Keown. Keown attempted to arrest captains Cook and Mitchell at the Union Home Guard camp, but they refused to comply. The "arrest" apparently was a pretense for gathering intelligence.

== Battle ==
The Union force occupied two adjoining farms ~600 yards apart belonging to Henry Harms and John Heisterberg. The camp being named Camp Lyon. Cook had about 400 infantry muskets. While up to 900 men had initially gathered, as many as half were furloughed for lack of weapons or for other reasons. O'Kane's force marched from Warsaw toward Cole Camp on June 18 to attack the gathering Home Guard. A respected older citizen, John Tyree, had witnessed the preparations of the secessionists and reported it to the officers at Camp Lyon. As he returned from reporting this, he was captured by O'Kane's force. Some of the men recognized him from earlier in the day, surmised what he had done, tied him to a tree and shot him. (Although a slaveholder, Tyree was a Union man.)

Despite Tyree's warning, Cook's preparations were inadequate, for his pickets were overrun without alerting the sleeping Home Guard. There were admissions of heavy drinking in the camp and the men were slumbering in the early morning hours of June 19 when the attack began. O'Kane's infantry double-quicked from the east to the Heisterberg barn where a portion of the Home Guard were and delivered a volley into the shocked men. However, a company of the Home Guard under Captain Elsinger was just north of the barn. They responded with fire into the flank of the attackers, but having little ammunition were soon forced to withdraw. O'Kane's mounted force then slammed into and drove away another nearby group of Home Guard that was attempting to form to repel the infantry.

Meanwhile, the remaining unengaged Union men at the Harms barn under Captains Grother and Mueller formed to join the fracas. The presence of a Union flag now in the hands of the rebels confused the men and they held their fire until they were fired upon. They withdrew without engaging and the fighting ended. Cook supposedly fled at the beginning of the fight. He claimed to have left to consult with Captain Totten of Lyon's forces, but his men claimed otherwise, and Henry Imhauser was elected commander in July, the regiment disbanded in September, and in November, Cook was "shot by rebels" in Henry County. His widow was denied a pension because Cook "was not in U.S. service at time of death." O'Kane subsequently served as Aide-de-Camp, 8th Confederate Cavalry Division and died 1908 in Arkansas.

== Aftermath ==
Union casualties were heavy with at least 34 killed or mortally wounded, 60 wounded, and 25 made prisoner. Perhaps most importantly, O'Kane's force captured 362 muskets with bayonets that would prove useful at the battles of Carthage and Wilson's Creek. Losses among O'Kane's men were around 7 killed and 25 wounded. Former Confederate President Jefferson Davis, in his 1890 book A Short History of the Confederate States of America, claimed that 206 Union soldiers were killed and wounded, and over 100 taken prisoner. O'Kane's men apparently murdered one of the prisoners who spoke little English and was a cook. They mistook him for Cook and shot him on the spot.

The victory opened a path for the fleeing Missouri State Guard. When O'Kane's men joined the gathering Missouri State Guard, their tale provided a morale boost to the rest of the beleaguered force. Sheriff Keown was captured along with 683 other Missouri State Guard recruits on December 19 in the Skirmish at Blackwater Creek. As a result of his actions at Cole Camp and in another affair, he was charged with spying and with robbing loyal citizens, but died in prison on April 16, 1862, before a trial was held.
