= Battle of Augusta (1862) =

Battle of the American Civil War

Coordinates: 38°46.219′N 84°00.459′W

- Part of the Western Theater of the American Civil War
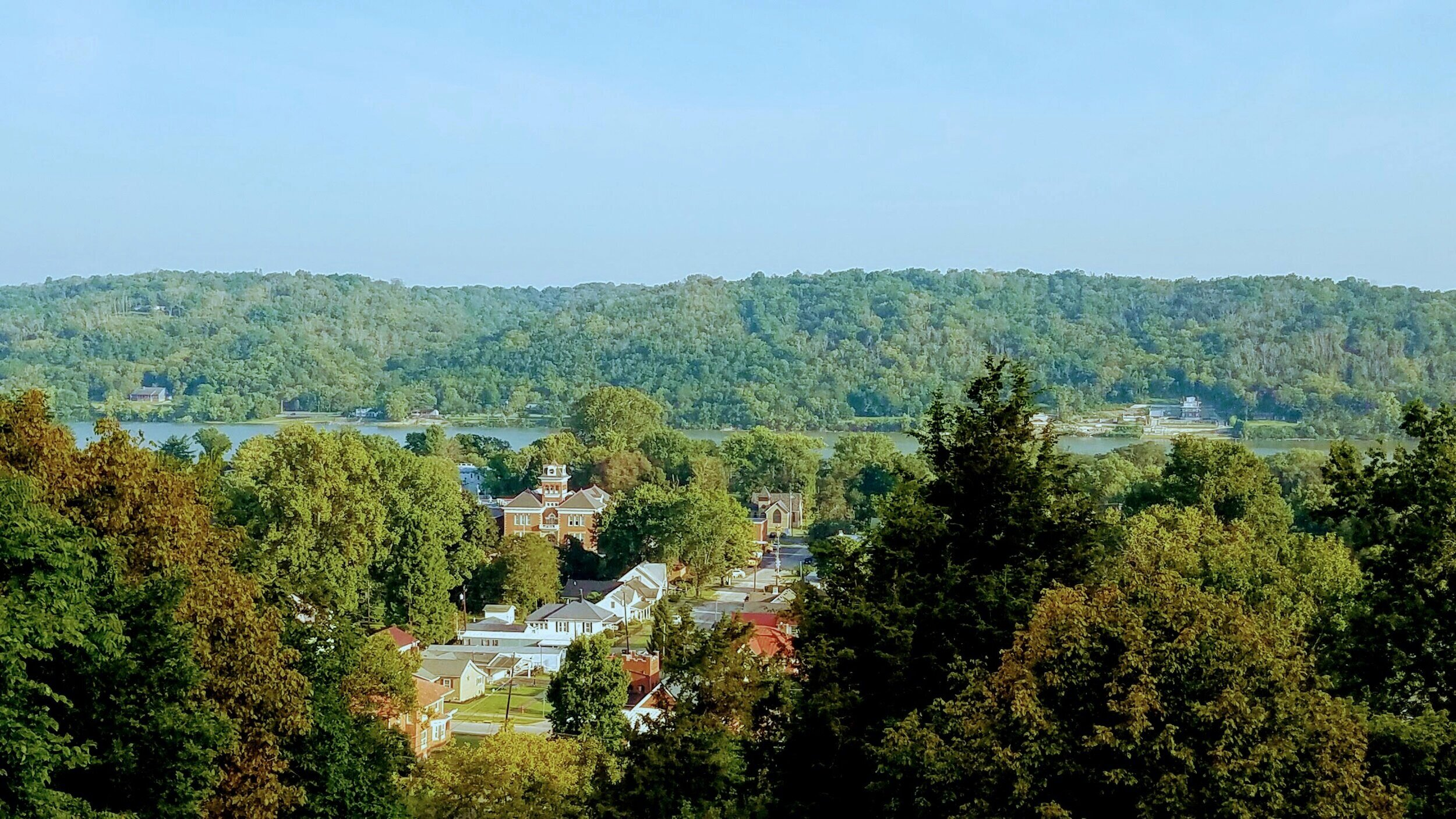
- View of Augusta from Hillside Cemetery
Date	September 27, 1862
Location	Augusta, Kentucky
Result	Confederate victory

Belligerents
United States	Confederate States

Commanders and leaders
J. Taylor Bradford	Basil W. Duke

Units involved
Home Guard (Union)	Second Kentucky Cavalry (Morgan's Cavalry Brigade Confederate Army of Kentucky)

Strength
150	450

Casualties and losses
12 killed 3 wounded 125 prisoners	21 killed 18 wounded

The Battle of Augusta was an engagement during the American Civil War that took place on September 27, 1862, in Augusta, Kentucky, between the Bracken County Home Guard (Union) and the Confederate Second Kentucky Cavalry Regiment under command of Colonel Basil W. Duke, a brother-in-law of John H. Morgan. The skirmish resulted in a victory for the Confederacy but the number of Confederate casualties and lack of ammunition for his artillery caused Colonel Duke to abandon plans to cross over the Ohio River into Ohio. A result of the fighting was that twenty buildings were set on fire and destroyed.

== Background ==
=== Kentucky campaign of 1862 ===
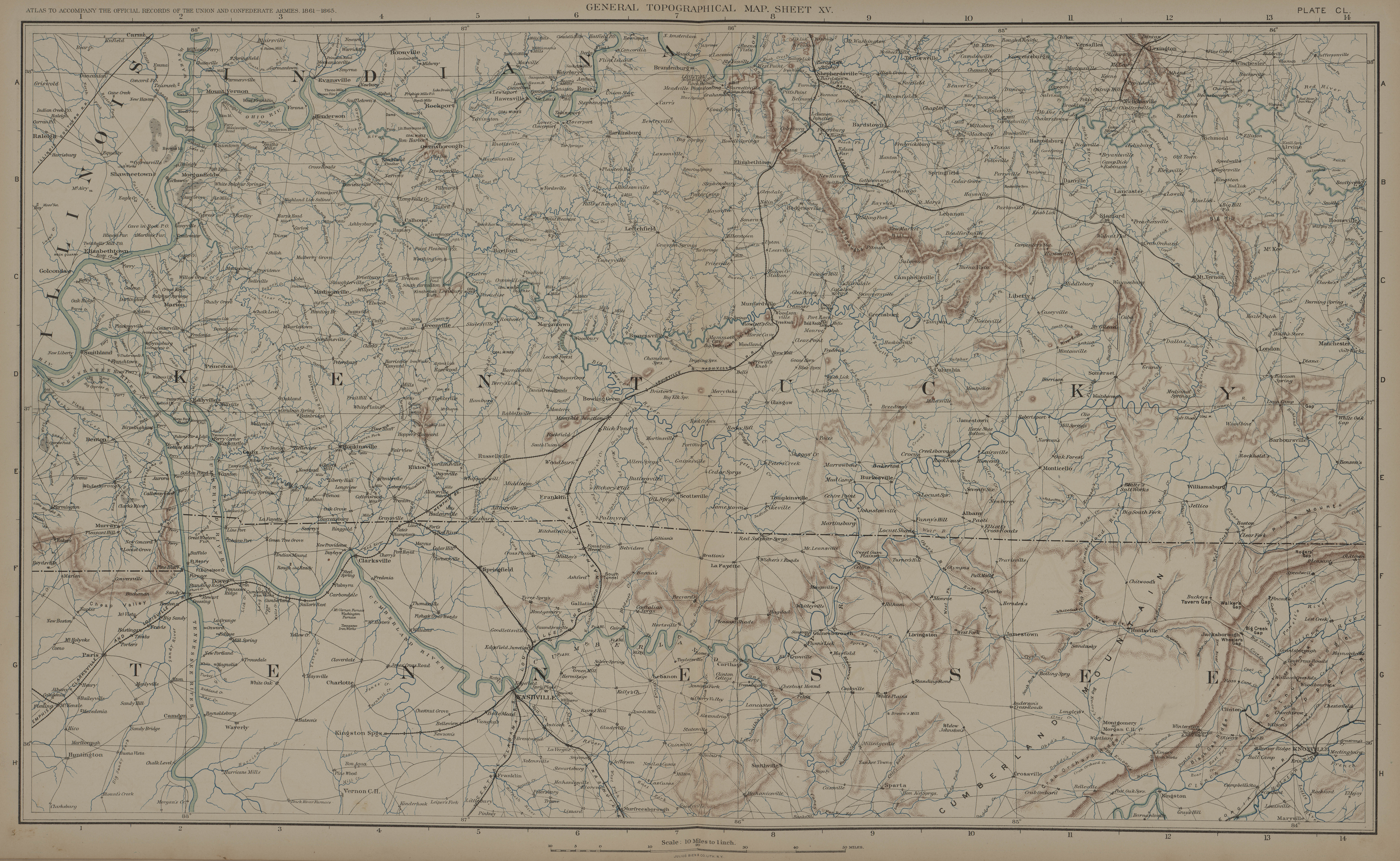
Kentucky-Tennessee, 1862

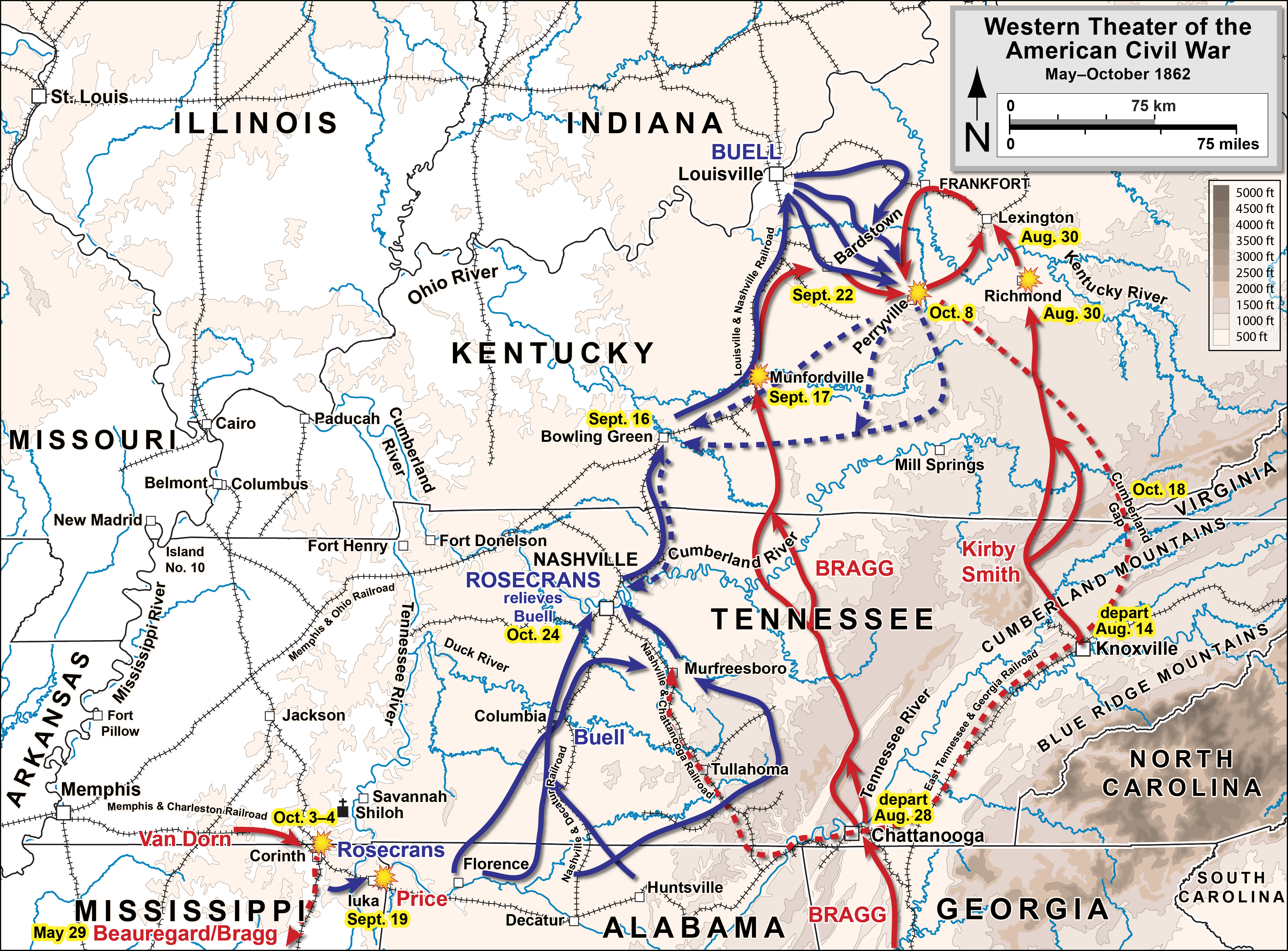
Western Theater: operations from the Siege of Corinth through the Kentucky Campaign Confederate Union

Situated between the Southern states of Tennessee and Virginia and the Northern states of Illinois, Indiana, and Ohio, the border state of Kentucky was coveted by both sides of the conflict because of its central location and its control of key rivers, particularly the Ohio. In September 1861, Kentucky-born President Abraham Lincoln wrote in a private letter, "I think to lose Kentucky is nearly to lose the whole game."

Opposing political elements within the state vied for control during the early part of the war, and the state legislature declared official neutrality to keep out both the Union and the Confederate armies. This neutrality was first violated on September 3, 1861, when Confederate Maj. Gen. Leonidas Polk occupied Columbus, considered key to controlling the Lower Mississippi. Two days later Union Brig. Gen. Ulysses S. Grant seized Paducah. Henceforth, the proclaimed neutrality was a dead letter. While the state never seceded from the Union, Confederate sympathizers who were members of the legislature set up a temporary Confederate capital in Bowling Green in November 1861. It never wielded significant power inside the state. The Confederate States recognized Kentucky and added a star representing the state to the Confederate flag.

The initiative to invade Kentucky came primarily from Confederate Maj. Gen. Edmund Kirby Smith, commander of the Department of East Tennessee. He believed the campaign would allow them to obtain supplies, enlist recruits, divert Union troops from Tennessee, and claim Kentucky for the Confederacy. In July 1862 Col. John Hunt Morgan carried out a successful cavalry raid in the state, venturing deeply into the rear areas of Buell's department. The raid caused considerable consternation in Buell's command and in Washington, D.C. During the raid, Morgan and his forces were cheered and supported by many residents. He added 300 Kentucky volunteers to his 900-man force during the raid. He confidently promised Kirby Smith, "The whole country can be secured, and 25,000 or 30,000 men will join you at once."

Bragg considered various options, including an attempt to retake Corinth, Mississippi, or to advance against Buell's army through Middle Tennessee. He eventually heeded Kirby Smith's calls for reinforcement and decided to relocate his Army of Mississippi to join with him. He moved 30,000 infantrymen in a tortuous railroad journey from Tupelo, Mississippi, through Mobile and Montgomery to Chattanooga. Supply wagons, cavalry, and artillery moved overland under their own power through Rome, Georgia. Although Bragg was the senior general in the theater, Confederate President Jefferson Davis had established Kirby Smith's Department of East Tennessee as an independent command, reporting directly to Richmond. This decision caused Bragg difficulty during the campaign.

Smith and Bragg met in Chattanooga on July 31, 1862, and devised a plan for the campaign: The newly created Army of Kentucky, including two of Bragg's brigades and approximately 21,000 men, would march north under Kirby Smith's command into Kentucky to dispose of the Union defenders of Cumberland Gap. (Bragg's army was too exhausted from its long journey to begin immediate offensive operations.) Smith would return to join Bragg, and their combined forces would attempt to maneuver into Buell's rear and force a battle to protect his supply lines. Any attempt by Ulysses S. Grant to reinforce Buell from northern Mississippi would be handled by the two small armies of Maj. Gens. Sterling Price and Earl Van Dorn.

Once the armies were combined, Bragg's seniority would apply and Smith would be under his direct command. Assuming that Buell's army could be destroyed, Bragg and Smith would march north into Kentucky, a movement they assumed would be welcomed by the local populace. Any remaining Federal force would be defeated in a grand battle in Kentucky, establishing the Confederate frontier at the Ohio River.

The campaign plan was bold but risky, requiring perfect coordination between multiple armies that would initially have no unity of command. Bragg almost immediately began to have second thoughts, despite pressure from President Davis to take Kentucky. Smith quickly abandoned the agreement, foreseeing that a solo adventure in Kentucky would bring him personal glory. He deceived Bragg as to his intentions and requested two additional brigades, ostensibly for his expedition to Cumberland Gap. On August 9, Smith informed Bragg that he was breaking the agreement and intended to bypass Cumberland Gap, leaving a small holding force to neutralize the Union garrison, and to move north. Unable to command Smith to honor their plan, Bragg focused on a movement to Lexington instead of Nashville. He cautioned Smith that Buell could pursue and defeat his smaller army before Bragg's army could join up with them.

Smith marched north with 21,000 men from Knoxville on August 13; Bragg departed from Chattanooga on August 27, just before Smith reached Lexington. The beginning of the campaign coincided with Gen. Robert E. Lee's offensive in the northern Virginia campaign (second Manassas campaign) and with Price's and Van Dorn's operations against Grant. Although not centrally directed, it was the largest simultaneous Confederate offensive of the war.

Meanwhile, Buell was forced to abandon his slow advance toward Chattanooga. Receiving word of the Confederate movements, he decided to concentrate his army around Nashville. The news that Smith and Bragg were both in Kentucky convinced him of the need to place his army between the Confederates and the Union cities of Louisville and Cincinnati. On September 7, Buell's Army of the Ohio left Nashville and began racing Bragg to Louisville.

On the way, Bragg was distracted by the capture of a Union fort at Munfordville. He had to decide whether to continue toward a fight with Buell (over Louisville) or rejoin Smith, who had gained control of the center of the state by capturing Richmond and Lexington, and threatened to move on Cincinnati. Bragg chose to rejoin Smith.

Buell reached Louisville, where he gathered, reorganized, and reinforced his army with thousands of new recruits. He dispatched 20,000 men under Brig. Gen. Joshua W. Sill toward Frankfort, hoping to distract Smith and prevent the two Confederate armies from joining against him. Meanwhile, Bragg left his army and met Smith in Frankfort, where they attended the inauguration of Confederate Governor Richard Hawes on October 4. The inauguration ceremony was disrupted by the sound of cannon fire from Sill's approaching division, and organizers canceled the inaugural ball scheduled for that evening.

=== Prelude to battle ===
Operating in northern Kentucky in conjunction with Henry Heth's Confederate infantry, Basil Duke with a portion of the Second Kentucky Cavalry conducted reconnaissance and small raids in the region, including a small engagement at Snow's Pond on September 25. Duke, in hearing that there was a Union force forming in Augusta, and desiring a chance to cross the Ohio River to threaten Cincinnati and force the Federal forces in northern Kentucky to fall back to protect Cincinnati, left Falmouth on September 26. There was a ford about one mile below Augusta that could be used in this attempt.

== Opposing forces ==
=== Union ===
Union Commander
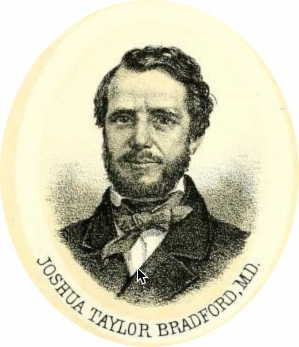
Joshua Taylor Bradford

- 125–150 Home Guard

=== Confederate ===
Confederate Commander
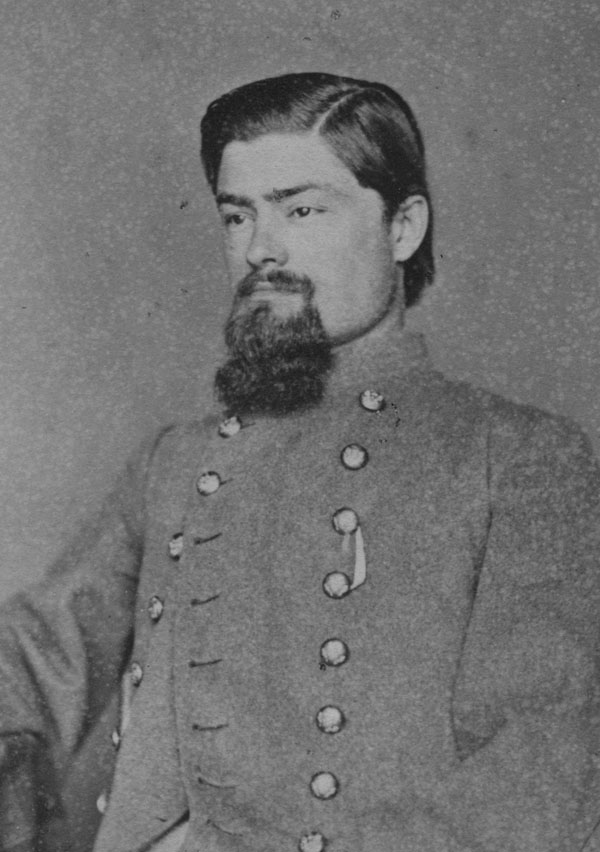
Basil Duke

- 450 men from the Second Kentucky Cavalry (Companies A, B, D, E, I, L, & M)
- two six pounder mountain howitzers

== Battle ==
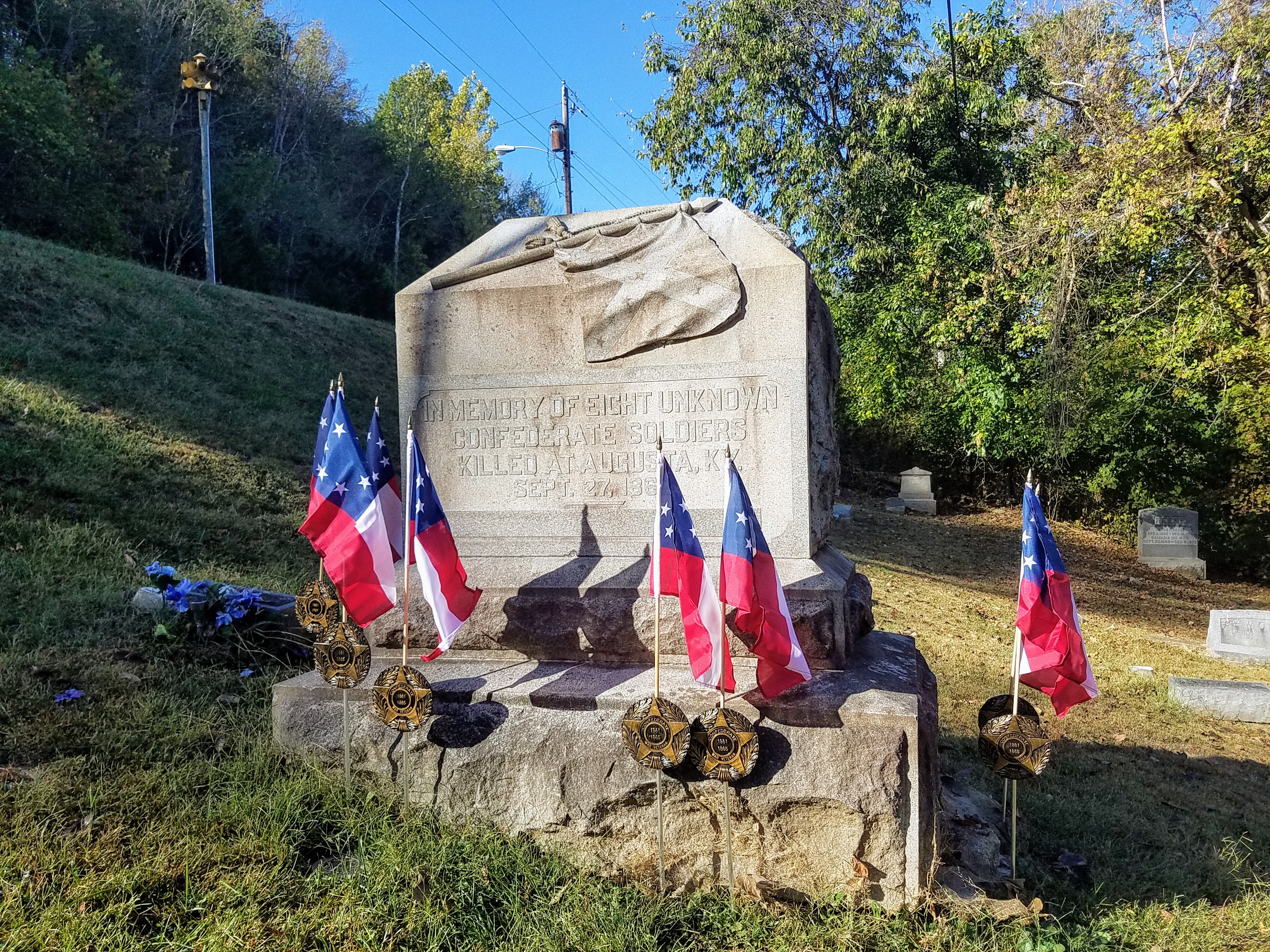
Confederate monument in Payne Cemetery

Around noon Basil Duke's Confederate force approached Augusta from Brooksville and occupied the heights overlooking the town. Two Union gunboats, the Florence Miller and Belfast, were on the Ohio River, and the latter boat fired three to five rounds from its twelve-pounder howitzer at the gathering Confederates, inflicting a few losses among a Confederate gun crew. The Confederate guns, a pair of six-pounder mountain howitzers known as the "bull pups" fired in return, causing a few hits to the boats as well as some consternation on the part of the gunboat captains. Duke dispatched the Confederate advanced guard and Company A towards a sand bar on the Ohio River east of town. Seeing this force coming down off the hill, and knowing the Confederate artillery could cause damage to the lightly defended boats (a single row of hay protected the Belfast's boiler), the gunboats moved upriver away from Augusta, with the Florence Miller counting over 150 holes caused by the Confederate small arms from the force now on the sand bar.

Duke, sensing an easy victory now that the gunboats were no longer a threat, sent Companies B and C into town. The Union defenders, about 150 local citizens formed into a Home Guard, had taken shelter in the various brick buildings in town. Many occupied second floors, from where they fired down on the Confederates, causing many casualties among the Confederate officers. Hearing the fighting taking place in the heart of town, the Confederates who had been sent to the sand bar now came galloping into town, and some were wounded and killed by their own artillery firing from the hills above town (the Confederates had been told to fight on foot, and hence the Confederate artillery crew had mistaken them possibly as Union troops).

The fighting now took on a fierce demeanor with accounts of hand-to-hand fighting, and Duke, seeing that some home guards were flying white flags of surrender while others continued to shoot down his men, ordered one of his bull pups into town to fire at short range at the defenders in the buildings. This, along with some deliberate actions on the part of Confederates, caused many buildings to catch on fire, in some cases trapping inside and burning alive the Home Guard defenders.

Duke, who wanted to not only break up the recruiting of a Federal Kentucky regiment in the area (of which Taylor was to be the commanding officer), but also to cross over the Ohio River and threaten Cincinnati, instead had to fall back to Brooksville as the ammunition supply for his artillery was now dangerously low.

The following morning, while paroling prisoners at Brooksville, found Duke under attack by another Federal force. The resulting skirmish was a very small affair, and resulted in only one casualty, and Duke was able to retreat to Falmouth.
