= Etna, Missouri =

Unincorporated community in Missouri, U.S.

Coordinates: 40°25′03″N 91°58′46″W

Etna is an unincorporated community in Scotland County, Missouri, United States. It lies at an elevation of 755 feet (230 m).

== History ==
The first settlement at Etna was made as early as 1855 by a colony of Germans. Etna, named for the Sicilian volcano, was surveyed and laid out in April 1865 by Andrew Hunt.

Etna was the site of a small skirmish during the early days of the Civil War. On July 21, 1861, the 1st Northeast Missouri Home Guards under Colonel David Moore, with assistance of additional units from Iowa and Illinois, attacked pro-Confederate Missouri State Guard (MSG) forces at Etna. The action was part of General Nathaniel Lyon's efforts to clear "rebels" from rural Missouri. After a brief battle the MSG forces, mostly lightly armed cavalry, were driven from the town and surrounding areas of Scotland County and Moore's unit returned to its main base at Athens, Missouri.

A post office called Etna was established in 1854 and remained in operation until 1903.

== Notable person ==
- Tom Horn, American Old West lawman, scout, and outlaw; raised on a farm near Etna.
