= Azen, Missouri =

Unincorporated community in Missouri, U.S.

Coordinates: 40°33′35″N 92°02′18″W

Azen is an unincorporated community in Scotland County, in the U.S. state of Missouri.

== History ==
A post office called Azen was established in 1878, and remained in operation until 1907. The community most likely derives its name from the last name of William Babcock Hazen, an officer in the Civil War.
