= Prospect Grove, Missouri =

Unincorporated community in Missouri, U.S.

Coordinates: 40°31′35″N 91°58′56″W

Prospect Grove was an unincorporated community in Scotland County, in the U.S. state of Missouri. As of 1938 all that remained was the schoolhouse, named after the community.

== History ==
A post office called Prospect Grove was established by 1853, and remained in operation until 1904. The post office was a farm in 1876. The community was named for the grove in the prairie near the original town site.
