= Kilwinning, Missouri =

Unincorporated community in Missouri, U.S.

Coordinates: 40°31′37″N 92°20′14″W

Kilwinning is an unincorporated community in Scotland County, in the U.S. state of Missouri.

== History ==
Kilwinning was originally called Uniontown, and under the latter name was platted in 1857. A post office called Kilwinning was established in 1880, and remained in operation until 1907. The community's name is a transfer from Kilwinning, in Scotland.
