= Edinburg, Scotland County, Missouri =

Unincorporated community in Missouri, U.S.

Coordinates: 40°22′25″N 92°11′05″W

Edinburg (sometimes spelled Edinburgh) is an unincorporated community in Scotland County, in the U.S. state of Missouri.

== History ==
A post office called Edinburg was established in 1841, and remained in operation until 1845. The community was named after Edinburgh, in Scotland, the ancestral home of government surveyor.
