= Crawford, Missouri =

Unincorporated community in Missouri, U.S.

Coordinates: 40°28′29″N 92°16′32″W

Crawford is an unincorporated community in Scotland County, in the U.S. state of Missouri.

== History ==
An early variant name was "Crawford Station". A post office called Crawford Station was established in 1878, the name was changed to Crawford in 1903, and the post office closed in 1906. J. H. Crawford, an early postmaster, gave the community his last name.
