= Gorin R-III School District =

School district in Missouri, United States

Gorin R-III School District was a former school district based in South Gorin, Missouri. It was located in Scotland County.

The district served students in the local rural community and operated Gorin Elementary School. It was one of the samllest school districts in Missouri before it was dissolved in 2015 and annexed into Soctland Country R-I School District.

== History ==
Joseph L. Buford was superintendent for a period until he resigned in 1947 and went to attend a university in Kirksville.

In 1958 there was a proposal to change the boundary between this school district and the Wyaconda School District. An arbitration board voted down the plan.

In 1958 organizers of a countywide high school invited the Gorin community to join the proposal.

In 1976 superintendent Clarence C. Erwin died after getting into an altercation with a father of a student.

In 2005 the same person was principal, superintendent, and special education director. At the time, enrollment was about 40.

=== Merger ===
In 2014 residents voted to merge this district into the Scotland County R-I School District, with 49 voters stating yes and 13 stating no.

The school district was scheduled to close on July 1, 2015, and consolidate into the Scotland County district. The final superintendent was Dave Shalley. At the end, it had a K-8 school with 24 students.
