= Martin E. Green =

Confederate brigadier general in the American Civil War

Martin Edwin Green
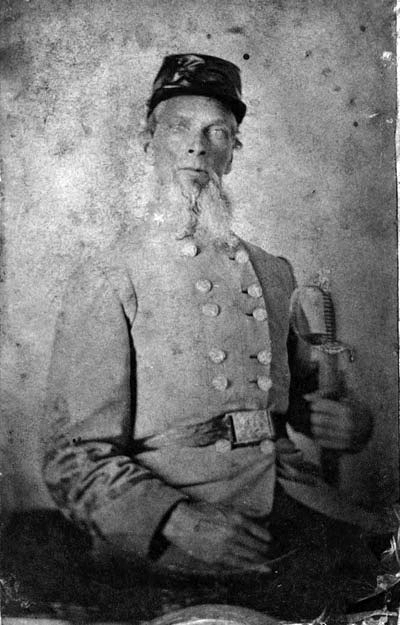
- Born: June 3, 1815; Fauquier County, Virginia
- Died: June 27, 1863 (aged 48); Vicksburg, Mississippi
- Burial place: Cedar Hill Cemetery, Vicksburg, Mississippi
- Military career
- Allegiance: Confederate States of America
- Branch: Confederate States Army
- Service years: 1861–63 (MSG/CSA)
- Rank: Brigadier General
- Conflicts: American Civil War: Battle of Athens; Battle of Lexington I; Battle of Pea Ridge; Battle of Iuka; Battle of Corinth II; Battle of Champion Hill; Battle of Vicksburg †

Martin Edwin Green (June 3, 1815 – June 27, 1863) was a Confederate brigadier general in the American Civil War, and a key organizer of the Missouri State Guard in northern Missouri.

== Early life ==
Green was born in Fauquier County, Virginia. In 1836 he and his young bride moved to Lewis County, Missouri where he and his brothers established a sawmill. He became a prominent Democrat and Judge of the Lewis County Court. His brother was Missouri's Democratic Party United States Senator James S. Green.

== Civil War ==
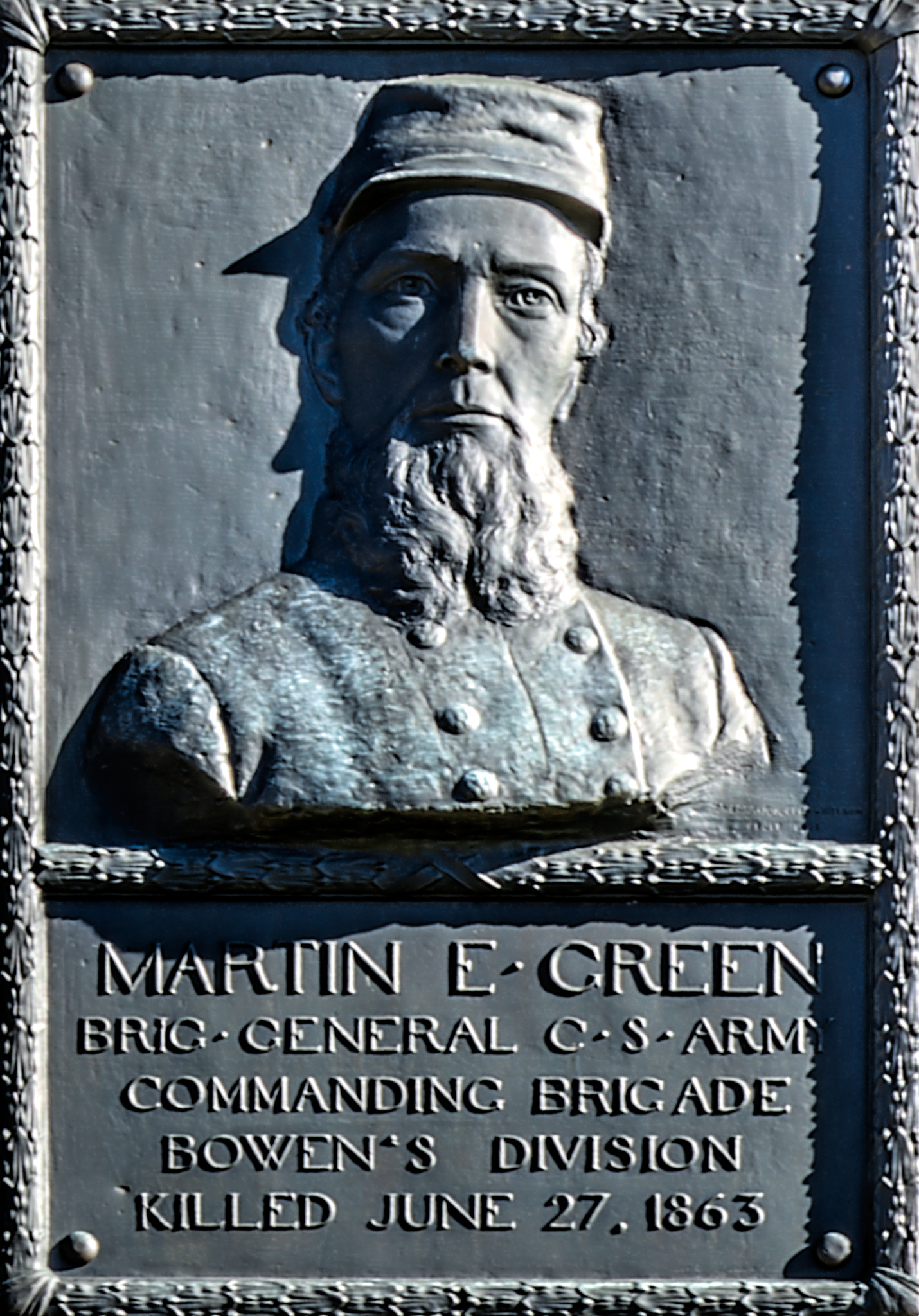
Bronze relief portrait of Green by T.A.R. Kitson at Vicksburg National Military Park

At the outbreak of the war in 1861, Green was a leading secessionist in Northeast Missouri. Following a July 4 riot at Canton, Missouri Judge Green summoned pro-Southern citizens to a training camp on the Fabius River under the auspices of the district's Missouri State Guard. He formed this mass into a cavalry regiment and Joseph C. Porter served as the lieutenant colonel.

Green went on the offensive in Northeast Missouri attempting to scatter David Moore's Union Home Guard regiment. Green's much larger force included some artillery and struck Moore at Athens. Green's raw recruits were repulsed and retreated from the field.

Green and his regiment participated in the successful attack on Lexington in September 1861 and at the defeat at Pea Ridge (or Elkhorn Tavern), March 1862. They also were present at the defeats at Iuka and Corinth.

== Promotion and death ==
Green was commissioned a Confederate States brigadier general from July 21, 1862. He commanded a brigade of Bowen's Division in the Siege of Vicksburg. He was slightly wounded on June 25, 1863. On June 27, 1863, during the siege, he was warned to keep his head down while inspecting the defenses. "A bullet has not yet been molded that will kill me", he answered. Those were his last words. Moments later he was shot in the head and killed by a Union sharpshooter. According to the NPS Confederate Soldier listing at Vicksburg, a footnote remarks he was interred at the George Marshall Lot; reportedly he is buried in Grave # 542 Cedar Hill Cemetery (Vicksburg, Mississippi).

== See also ==
- List of American Civil War generals (Confederate)
