= Pleasant Retreat, Missouri =

Unincorporated community in Missouri, U.S.

Coordinates: 40°22′02″N 92°13′02″W

Pleasant Retreat is an unincorporated community in Scotland County, in the U.S. state of Missouri.

== History ==
A post office called Pleasant Retreat was established in 1850, and remained in operation until 1901. The community was descriptively named.
