= Brock, Missouri =

Unincorporated community in Missouri, U.S.

Coordinates: 40°33′04″N 92°09′07″W

Brock is an unincorporated community in Scotland County, in the U.S. state of Missouri.

== History ==
A post office called Brock was established in 1889, and remained in operation until 1904. The community has the name of William J. Brock, a state legislator.
