= Ella Abomah Williams =

American performer

Ella Williams (1865–1928), also known by her stage name Mme Abomah, was an American performer. She was a woman of extraordinary height and strength who became an international celebrity in the late 1800s. Born in South Carolina in 1865 to parents who were former slaves. She had contracted malaria when she was around 14 years old.

== Early years ==
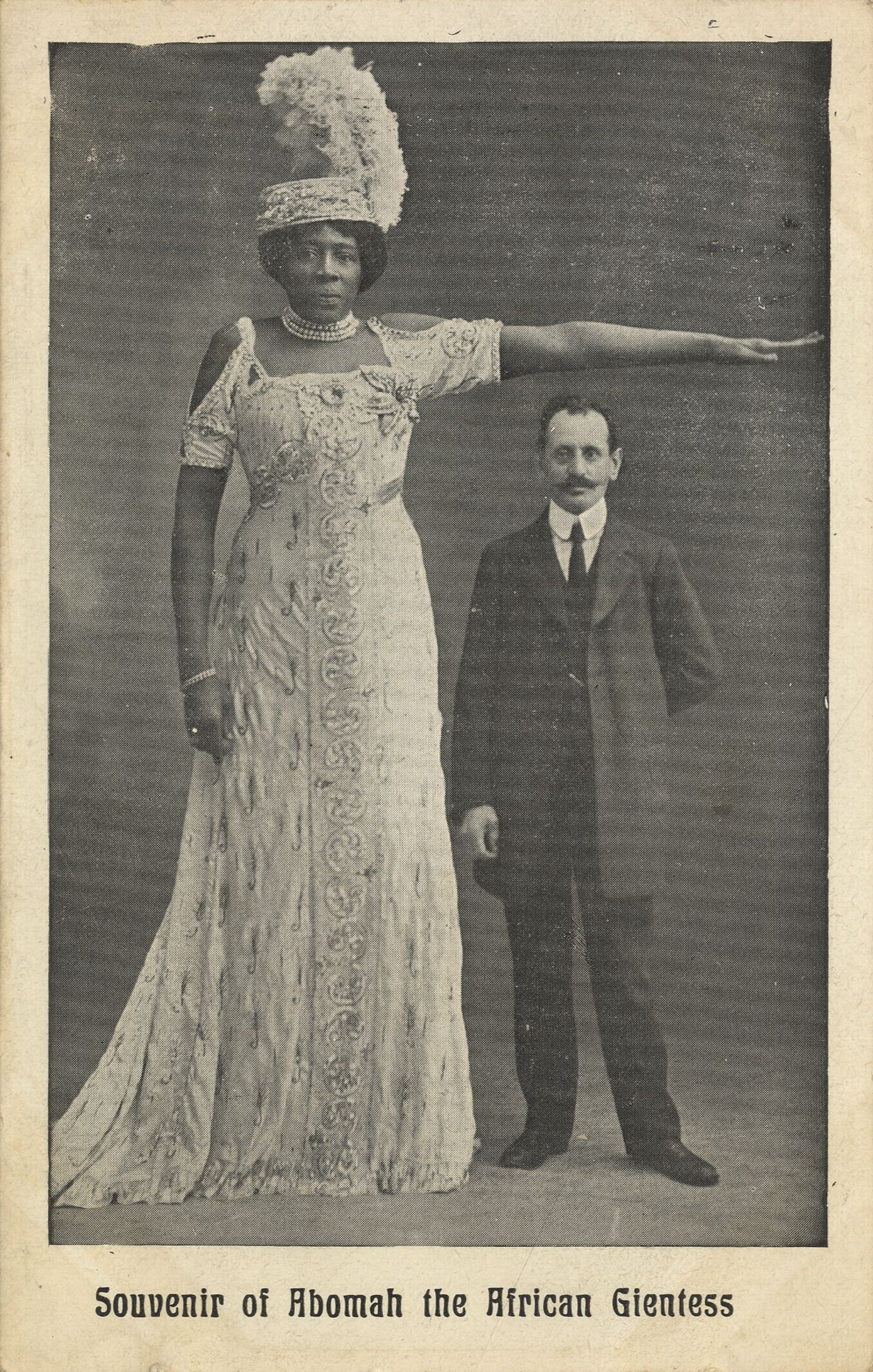
Mme Abomah

Ella Grigsby was born in October 1865, just 10 months after the 13th Amendment to the US Constitution abolished slavery. As a teenager, she began working for Elihu and Harriet Williams, and she chose to take their surname as her own, possibly because her parents had been slaves owned by the Grigsby family.

She worked as a cook in South Carolina and was contacted by various circus and show promoters to sign a contract and tour as a giantess, but she initially refused these offers. Abomah stated that her siblings did not share her unusual size, and although she received offers from vaudeville and circus promoters to tour as a giantess, she consistently declined them. A 1915 article credits Mme. Abomah:

I was born near Cross Hill in Laurens county. None of my sisters or brothers are unusually large. For years every time a show man saw me he would want me to sign a contract, but I never could make up my mind to leave Columbia. Finally in the fall of 1896 while I was cooking for a prominent family in Columbia, Manager F.C. Bostock got me to sign up for a tour.

== Professional life ==
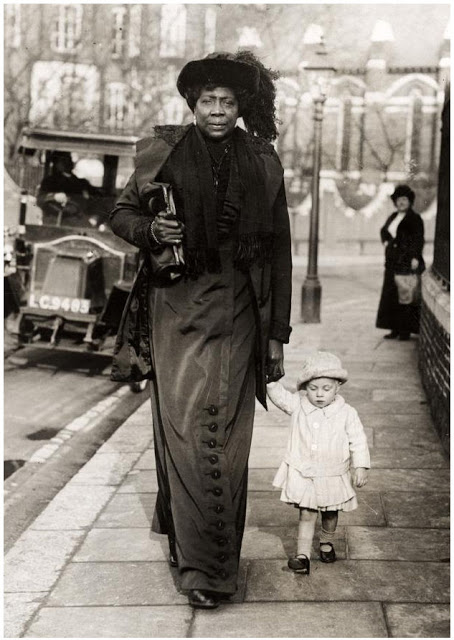
Mme Abomah with infant.

Williams gained fame when she agreed to tour Europe as a giantess with Frank C. Bostock in 1896. Bostock promoted her as a member of the legendary Dahomey Amazons, a famous all-female fighting force. He gave her the stage name Mademoiselle Abomah, which came from Abomey, the capital of the Kingdom of Dahomey.

Abomah and her manager decided to take her act to Europe.

Abomah's performances included singing minstrel songs, which were popular at the time but often contained prejudiced language. Despite this, it was necessary for the success of black performers. Abomah performed these songs with grace and polish, and despite her height, she moved with no indication of awkwardness or imbalance.

As a result, Abomah toured various parts of Europe, as well as Australia, New Zealand, South America, and Cuba over the course of her 30-year career. She was known for her expensive and extensive wardrobe, which gave her a royal and elegant appearance. Abomah went on a successful tour of Europe between 1910 and 1911, during which she performed in various locations including Liverpool, Blackpool, and at English variety halls. She also toured Australia in 1903, New Zealand between 1904 and 1908, South America in 1909, and visited Coney Island and Cuba in 1917. Additionally, Abomah performed with Reynold's Waxworks and Exhibition in 1900, 1903, and 1912–1913, and with Barnum and Bailey in 1918. In 1920, she performed at Dreamland and the World's Museum, and in 1921, it was announced that she was going to sail to Paris for a three-month engagement.

During her time in New Zealand, Abomah was known for her extensive and expensive wardrobe, and she had an attendant who added to her regal appearance. When she performed at the Alhambra Theatre in Dunedin, one newspaper reported that she completely dwarfed any average man or woman, standing at 6‘10”. Despite her imposing size, Abomah was well-proportioned and impressed the audience with her posing and singing, including a rendition of "My Honolulu Bell" which was well received. This report was published in the Otago [NZ] Witness in 1904.

Abomah cancelled her tours and returned to the US when Britain declared war on Germany in August 1914. She continued to work for Ringling Brothers, Barnum & Bailey, and at Coney Island until the 1920s when she left the show business.

After the 1920s, Abomah's whereabouts are not well-documented. However, it is known that she remained involved with the circus in some capacity into her sixties.

According to an article from the Tampa Morning Tribune dated August 23, 1928, she was well-off when she died in Hawaii in 1928.

== See also ==
- Ella Ewing
- Amazons
- Macrophilia
