= Sand Hill, Missouri =

Unincorporated community in Missouri, U.S.

Coordinates: 40°18′41″N 92°07′41″W

Sand Hill (sometimes spelled Sandhill) is an unincorporated community in Scotland County, in the U.S. state of Missouri.

== History ==
A post office called Sand Hill was established in 1845, and remained in operation until 1903. The community was so named on account of the sandy soil in the area.
