= Dancing Rabbit Ecovillage =

Coordinates: 40°20′0″N 92°5′47″W

Dancing Rabbit is a 280 acres (1.1 km^{2}) ecovillage near Rutledge, Missouri, United States, that was formed in 1997. It has a population of 70 people who abide by ecological covenants and sustainability guidelines, but are otherwise responsible for their own finances, food, housing, and other necessities. It was founded by three Stanford students, who chose the area, near an existing intentional community named Sandhill Farm, because land there was abundant and cheap. They set-up a nonprofit land trust so that the land would remain affordable forever.

The ecovillage was featured in an episode of the FX television series 30 Days, where two non-residents stayed in the village, lived in a converted grain bin, and helped with projects such as gardening, natural building and cooking for a month. The village was also featured in the 2012 documentary short The Rhythm of Rutledge. and an episode of My World, Too, which addressed sustainable practices and details of living in the ecovillage.

Dancing Rabbit hosts many courses on topics related to sustainability, such as natural building and permaculture design. They have many events open to the general public and host regular tours.
