= Scotland County, Missouri =

County in Missouri, United States

- County
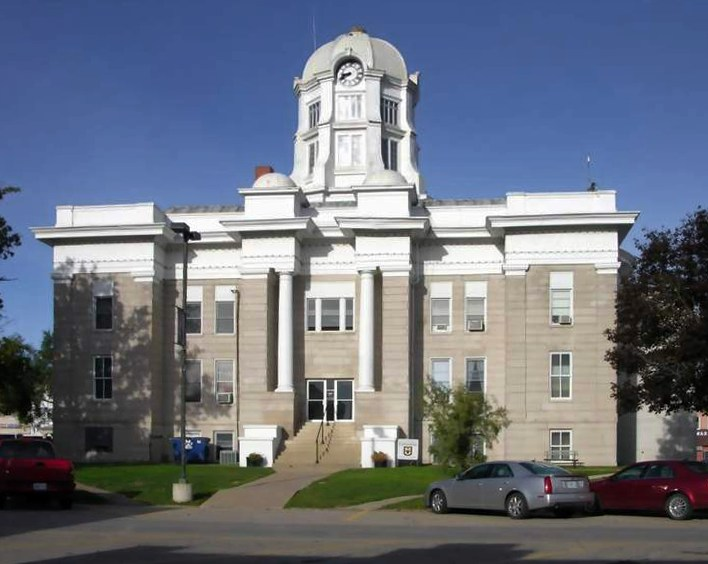
- Scotland County court house in Memphis

- Location within the U.S. state of Missouri
- Coordinates: 40°27′N 92°09′W
- Country: United States
- State: Missouri
- Founded: January 29, 1841
- Named for: Scotland
- Seat: Memphis
- Largest city: Memphis

Area
  - Total: 439 sq mi (1,140 km^{2})
  - Land: 437 sq mi (1,130 km^{2})
  - Water: 2.6 sq mi (6.7 km^{2}) 0.6%

Population (2020)
  - Total: 4,716
  - Estimate (2025): 4,796 ▲
  - Density: 10.8/sq mi (4.17/km^{2})
- Time zone: UTC−6 (Central)
  - Summer (DST): UTC−5 (CDT)
- Congressional district: 6th
- Website: www.scotlandcountymo.org

Scotland County is a county in northeastern Missouri. As of the 2020 census, its population was 4,716, making it Missouri's seventh-least populous county. Its county seat is Memphis. The county was organized on January 29, 1841, and named for the country of Scotland.

== History ==
The Missouri General Assembly organized Scotland County on January 29, 1841. At first its boundaries contained all the land now known as Knox County as well, but in 1843 the General Assembly divided it off. Stephen W. B. Carnegy suggested that the county be named after his native Scotland. He also gave several settlements in the area Scottish names.

The first white settlement in Scotland County was in 1833 by brothers Levi and George Rhodes and their families near a location known as Sand Hill. Sand Hill was in the southern part of the county, about 12 miles from present-day Memphis. A general store was opened there around 1835 by James l. Jones, who also served as Scotland County's first sheriff.

Slavery, while never as prevalent in Scotland County as in other counties further south in the state's Little Dixie region, existed from the county's earliest days. Robert T. Smith brought the first slaves, a group of three, to the county in 1834. In 1850 Scotland County had 157 slaves or other "non-free people of color", but by the 1860 census that number had dropped to 131.

Farming was Scotland County's primary economic lifeblood from its earliest times. Once the stands of timber were cleared and the tough prairie grass plowed aside, settlers found rich soil. Between 1850 and 1880 the number of farms in the county grew from 334 to 1,994. The value of the farmland, in 1880 dollars, was over $3.72 million. Corn was the major cash crop, followed by oats, wheat, and potatoes.

=== The Civil War ===
Scotland County was the scene of three notable engagements during the American Civil War. The first happened at Etna on July 21, 1861. The 1st Northeast Missouri Home Guards under Colonel David Moore with assistance from additional units from Iowa and Illinois attacked pro-Confederate Missouri State Guard (MSG) forces using Etna as a training and resupply point. The action was part of General Nathaniel Lyon's efforts to clear "rebels" from rural Missouri. After a brief battle the MSG forces, mostly lightly armed cavalry, were driven from the town and surrounding areas of Scotland County and Moore's unit returned to its main base at Athens, Missouri.

On July 13, 1862, Confederate Colonel Joseph C. Porter approached Memphis in four converging columns totaling 125–169 men and captured it with little or no resistance. They first raided the federal armory, seizing about 100 muskets with cartridge boxes and ammunition, and several uniforms. The Confederates rounded up all adult men, who were taken to the courthouse to swear not to divulge any information about the raiders for 48 hours. Porter freed all militiamen and suspected militiamen to await parole, a fact noted by champions of his character. Citizens expressed their sympathies variously; Porter gave safe passage to a physician, an admitted Union supporter, who was anxious to return to his seriously ill wife. One of Porter's troops threatened a verbally abusive woman with a pistol, perhaps as a bluff. Porter's troops entered the courthouse and destroyed all indictments for horse theft, an act variously understood as simple lawlessness, intervention on behalf of criminal associates, or interference with politically motivated, fraudulent charges.

At Memphis, a key incident occurred that darkened Porter's reputation, and which his detractors see as part of a behavioral pattern that put him and his men beyond the norms of warfare. According to the History of Shelby County, which is generally sympathetic to Porter, "Most conceded that Col. Porter’s purpose for capturing Memphis, MO. was to seize Dr. Wm. Aylward, a prominent Union man of the community." Aylward was captured during the day by Captain Tom Stacy's men and confined to a house. Stacy was generally regarded as a genuine bushwhacker; other members of Porter's command called his company "the chain gang" due to its behavior. After rousing Aylward overnight and removing him from his home, ostensibly to see Porter, guards claimed that he escaped. But witnesses reported hearing the sounds of a strangling, and his body was found the next day with marks consistent with hanging or strangulation. Supporters of Porter attribute Aylward's murder to Stacy. But a Union gentleman who came to inquire about Aylward and a captured officer before the discovery of the body said that when he asked Porter about Aylward, the response was, "He is where he will never disturb anybody else."

The next engagement in the county took place on July 18, 1862. Union Colonel (later General) John McNeil had been pursuing Porter and his forces across northeast Missouri for some time. Hearing of the capture of Memphis, McNeil sent a detachment of three companies (C, H, and I), about 300 men, of Merrill's Horse under Major John Y. Clopper from Newark, Missouri, to rescue the town. Porter and his Confederate forces, their strength estimated at anywhere between 125 men to 600, planned to ambush the Federals. This became known as the Battle of Vassar Hill in the History of Scotland County. Porter called it Oak Ridge, and Federal forces called it Pierce's Mill. By whatever name, it happened about ten miles southwest of Memphis on the south fork of the Middle Fabius River.

Porter's men were concealed in brush and stayed low when the Federals stopped to fire before each charge. Porter's men held their fire until the range was very short, increasing the volley's lethality. Clopper was in the Federal front, and of 21 men of his advance guard, all but one were killed or wounded. The Federals made at least seven mounted charges, doing little but adding to the body count. A battalion of roughly 100 men of the 11th Missouri State Militia Cavalry under Major Rogers arrived and dismounted. Clopper claimed to have driven the enemy from the field after this, but eyewitness Joseph Mudd said the Union troops fell back and ended the engagement, leaving Porter in possession of the field until he withdrew. Clopper's reputation suffered as a result of his poor tactics. Before the final charge, one company officer angrily asked, "Why don't you dismount those men and stop murdering them?" Union casualties were about 24 dead and mortally wounded (10 from Merrill's Horse and 14 from the 11th MSM Cavalry), and perhaps 59 wounded (24 from Merrill's Horse, and 35 from the 11th MSM Cavalry.) Porter's loss was as little as three killed and five wounded according to Mudd, or six killed, three mortally wounded, and 10 wounded left on the field according to the Shelby County History.

=== Postwar to present ===
In the 1880s, a group called The Tax-payers' Association of Scotland County formed to resist paying local taxes and intimidate any potential bidders on horses and mules that had been seized to cover those taxes. The handling of county debt collection went to the Supreme Court in Findlay v. McAllister.

== Geography ==
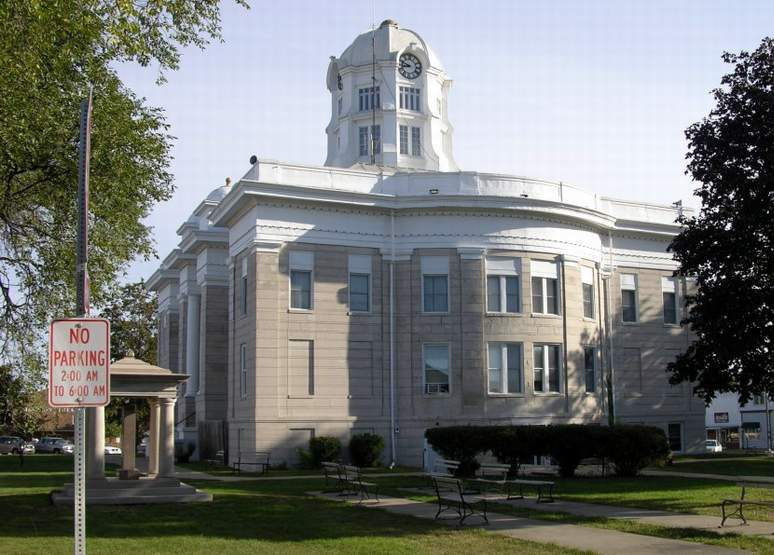
Another view of the Scotland County courthouse.

According to the U.S. Census Bureau, the county has an area of 439 square miles (1,140 km^{2}), of which 437 square miles (1,130 km^{2}) is land and 2.6 square miles (6.7 km^{2}) (0.6%) is water. Scotland County borders Iowa to the north.

=== Adjacent counties ===
- Davis County, Iowa (northwest)
- Van Buren County, Iowa (northeast)
- Clark County (east)
- Knox County (south)
- Adair County (southwest)
- Schuyler County (west)

=== Major highways ===
- U.S. Route 136
- Route 15

== Demographics ==
Historical population
Census	Pop.	Note	%±
1850	3,782		—
1860	8,873		134.6%
1870	10,670		20.3%
1880	12,508		17.2%
1890	12,674		1.3%
1900	13,232		4.4%
1910	11,869		−10.3%
1920	10,700		−9.8%
1930	8,853		−17.3%
1940	8,557		−3.3%
1950	7,332		−14.3%
1960	6,484		−11.6%
1970	5,499		−15.2%
1980	5,415		−1.5%
1990	4,822		−11.0%
2000	4,983		3.3%
2010	4,843		−2.8%
2020	4,716		−2.6%
2025 (est.)	4,796	▲	1.7%
U.S. Decennial Census; 1790-1960 1900-1990; 1990-2000 2010-2015

=== 2020 census ===
As of the 2020 census, the county had a population of 4,716, a median age of 36.7 years, 29.8% of residents under the age of 18, and 18.9% who were 65 years of age or older. For every 100 females there were 99.0 males, and for every 100 females age 18 and over there were 96.7 males age 18 and over.

The racial makeup of the county was 96.5% White, 0.3% Black or African American, 0.1% American Indian and Alaska Native, 0.2% Asian, 0.1% Native Hawaiian and Pacific Islander, 0.0% from some other race, and 2.9% from two or more races; Hispanic or Latino residents of any race comprised 0.7% of the population.

All of the county's residents were classified as living in rural areas, with 0.0% in urban areas and 100.0% in rural areas.

There were 1,809 households in the county, of which 33.9% had children under the age of 18 living with them and 22.6% had a female householder with no spouse or partner present. About 29.5% of households were made up of individuals and 14.4% had someone living alone who was 65 years of age or older.

There were 2,210 housing units, of which 18.1% were vacant; among occupied housing units, 75.3% were owner-occupied and 24.7% were renter-occupied. The homeowner vacancy rate was 2.0% and the rental vacancy rate was 14.6%.

=== Racial and ethnic composition ===
Scotland County, Missouri – Racial and ethnic composition Note: the US Census treats Hispanic/Latino as an ethnic category. This table excludes Latinos from the racial categories and assigns them to a separate category. Hispanics/Latinos may be of any race.
Race / Ethnicity (NH = Non-Hispanic)	Pop 1980	Pop 1990	Pop 2000	Pop 2010	Pop 2020	% 1980	% 1990	% 2000	% 2010	% 2020
White alone (NH)	5,377	4,797	4,890	4,760	4,537	99.30%	99.48%	98.13%	98.29%	96.20%
Black or African American alone (NH)	2	3	10	3	6	0.04%	0.06%	0.20%	0.06%	0.13%
Native American or Alaska Native alone (NH)	1	10	7	12	5	0.02%	0.21%	0.14%	0.25%	0.11%
Asian alone (NH)	7	0	4	11	5	0.13%	0.00%	0.08%	0.23%	0.11%
Native Hawaiian or Pacific Islander alone (NH)	x	x	1	0	1	x	x	0.02%	0.00%	0.02%
Other race alone (NH)	4	0	0	1	0	0.07%	0.00%	0.00%	0.02%	0.00%
Mixed race or Multiracial (NH)	x	x	29	23	127	x	x	0.58%	0.47%	2.69%
Hispanic or Latino (any race)	24	12	42	33	35	0.44%	0.25%	0.84%	0.68%	0.74%
Total	5,415	4,822	4,983	4,843	4,716	100.00%	100.00%	100.00%	100.00%	100.00%

=== 2010 census ===
As of the census of 2010, there were 4,843 people, 1,902 households, and 1,302 families residing in the county. The population density was 11 people per square mile (4.2 people/km^{2}). There were 2,292 housing units at an average density of 5 units per square mile (1.9/km^{2}). The racial makeup of the county was 98.82% White, 0.20% Black or African American, 0.14% Native American, 0.08% Asian, 0.02% Pacific Islander, 0.16% from other races, and 0.58% from two or more races. Approximately 0.84% of the population were Hispanic or Latino of any race. In the county, 5.72% report speaking Pennsylvania German, Dutch, or German at home, while 1.58% speak Spanish.

There were 1,902 households, of which 32.40% had children under the age of 18 living with them, 58.20% were married couples living together, 7.00% had a female householder with no husband present, and 31.50% were non-families. 28.20% of all households were made up of individuals, and 15.30% had someone living alone who was 65 years of age or older. The average household size was 2.55 and the average family size was 3.16.

In the county, the population was spread out, with 28.60% under the age of 18, 7.60% from 18 to 24, 24.10% from 25 to 44, 20.80% from 45 to 64, and 19.00% who were 65 years of age or older. The median age was 37 years. For every 100 females there were 94.30 males. For every 100 females age 18 and over, there were 87.80 males.

The median income for a household in the county was $27,409, and the median income for a family was $33,529. Males had a median income of $23,836 versus $16,866 for females. The per capita income for the county was $14,474. About 13.40% of families and 16.80% of the population were below the poverty line, including 21.70% of those under age 18 and 13.50% of those age 65 or over.

== Education ==
School districts in the county, including those with any territory, no matter how slight: Scotland County R-I School District, Knox County R-I School District, and Schuyler County R-I School District.

Previously an elementary school district, Gorin R-III School District, had territory in the county. The Gorin district closed on July 1, 2015 and consolidated into the Scotland County R-1 district.

=== Public schools ===
One of the school districts operates schools in the county limits:

- Scotland County R-I School District – Memphis
  - Scotland County Elementary School (PK-06)
  - Scotland County High School (07-12)

=== Public libraries ===
- Scotland County Memorial Library

== Communities ==
=== Cities ===
- Memphis (county seat)
- South Gorin

=== Villages ===
- Arbela
- Granger
- Rutledge

=== Unincorporated communities ===
- Azen
- Bible Grove
- Brock
- Crawford
- Edinburg
- Energy
- Etna
- Hitt
- Kilwinning
- Middle Fabius
- Pleasant Retreat
- Prospect Grove
- Sand Hill
- Unity

== Notable people ==
- Ella Ewing, world's tallest woman (in her era), lived much of her life (and died) near Gorin. Buried in the Harmony Grove church cemetery in Rutledge, MO.
- Alexandre Hogue, realist painter, known mostly for landscapes.
- Tom Horn, Old West lawman, scout, outlaw and assassin, born near Granger in 1860.
- George Saling, gold medal winner at the 1932 Summer Olympics, 110m hurdles.
- Adrienne Wilkinson, TV, film and voiceover actress. Notable roles on Xena: Warrior Princess and As If.
- Sedona Schnebly, an Arizona pioneer and namesake of Sedona, Arizona, born in Gorin.

== Politics ==
=== Local ===
The Democratic Party controls politics at the local level in Scotland County. Democrats hold all but five of the elected positions in the county.

Scotland County, Missouri

Elected countywide officials
Assessor	James Ward	Republican
Circuit Clerk	Anita Watkins	Democratic
County Clerk	Batina Dodge	Democratic
Collector	Kathy Becraft	
Commissioner (presiding)	Duane Ebeling	Republican
Commissioner (district 1)	Danette Clatt	Republican
Commissioner (district 2)	David Wiggins	Republican
Coroner	Dr. Jeff Davis	Republican
Prosecuting Attorney	Kimberly J. Nicoli	Democratic
Public Administrator	Patty Freeburg	Democratic
Recorder	Dana Glasscock	Democratic
Sheriff	Bryan Whitney	Republican
Surveyor	Robert Revere	Democratic
Treasurer	Tasha Fadiga	Republican

=== State ===
Past Gubernatorial Elections Results
Year	Republican	Democratic	Third Parties
2024	83.36% 1,553	15.19% 283	1.45% 27
2020	81.02% 1,584	17.49% 342	1.48% 29
2016	65.32% 1,273	31.30% 610	3.38% 66
2012	48.61% 930	48.14% 921	3.24% 62
2008	57.14% 1,197	40.91% 857	1.96% 41
2004	70.16% 1,507	28.63% 615	1.22% 26
2000	53.00% 1,129	45.16% 962	1.84% 39
1996	24.62% 499	72.52% 1,470	2.86% 58

Scotland County is in Missouri's 4th District in the Missouri House of Representatives and is represented by Craig Redmon (R-Canton).

Missouri House of Representatives — District 4 — Scotland County (2016)
Party	Candidate	Votes	%	±%
Republican	Craig Redmon	1,677	100.00%	

Missouri House of Representatives — District 4 — Scotland County (2014)
Party	Candidate	Votes	%	±%
Republican	Craig Redmon	1,276	100.00%	

Missouri House of Representatives — District 4 — Scotland County (2012)
Party	Candidate	Votes	%	±%
Republican	Craig Redmon	1,595	100.00%	

Scotland County is a part of Missouri's 18th District in the Missouri Senate and is represented by Brian Munzlinger (R-Williamstown).

Missouri Senate — District 18 — Scotland County (2014)
Party	Candidate	Votes	%	±%
Republican	Brian Munzlinger	1,244	100.00%	

=== Federal ===
U.S. Senate — Missouri — Scotland County (2016)
Party	Candidate	Votes	%	±%
Republican	Roy Blunt	1,283	66.13%	+19.13
Democratic	Jason Kander	570	29.38%	−19.76
Libertarian	Jonathan Dine	39	2.01%	−1.85
Green	Johnathan McFarland	18	0.93%	+0.93
Constitution	Fred Ryman	30	1.55%	+1.55

U.S. Senate — Missouri — Scotland County (2012)
Party	Candidate	Votes	%	±%
Republican	Todd Akin	900	47.00%	
Democratic	Claire McCaskill	941	49.14%	
Libertarian	Jonathan Dine	74	3.86%	

Scotland County is in Missouri's 6th Congressional District and is represented by Sam Graves (R-Tarkio) in the U.S. House of Representatives.

U.S. House of Representatives — Missouri's 6th Congressional District — Scotland County (2016)
Party	Candidate	Votes	%	±%
Republican	Sam Graves	1,509	79.01%	+4.20
Democratic	David M. Blackwell	333	17.43%	−5.15
Libertarian	Russ Lee Monchil	29	1.52%	−1.09
Green	Mike Diel	39	2.04%	+2.04

U.S. House of Representatives — Missouri’s 6th Congressional District — Scotland County (2014)
Party	Candidate	Votes	%	±%
Republican	Sam Graves	1,090	74.81%	+5.27
Democratic	Bill Hedge	329	22.58%	−5.46
Libertarian	Russ Lee Monchil	38	2.61%	+0.19

U.S. House of Representatives — Missouri's 6th Congressional District — Scotland County (2012)
Party	Candidate	Votes	%	±%
Republican	Sam Graves	1,265	69.54%	
Democratic	Kyle Yarber	510	28.04%	
Libertarian	Russ Monchil	44	2.42%	

United States presidential election results for Scotland County, Missouri
Year	Republican		Democratic		Third party(ies)	
Year	No.	%	No.	%	No.	%
1888	1,226	41.71%	1,680	57.16%	33	1.12%
1892	940	33.29%	1,369	48.48%	515	18.24%
1896	1,203	36.47%	2,077	62.96%	19	0.58%
1900	1,277	40.84%	1,760	56.28%	90	2.88%
1904	1,354	45.54%	1,530	51.46%	89	2.99%
1908	1,273	43.94%	1,564	53.99%	60	2.07%
1912	860	30.08%	1,525	53.34%	474	16.58%
1916	1,243	42.86%	1,592	54.90%	65	2.24%
1920	2,509	53.11%	2,124	44.96%	91	1.93%
1924	2,282	44.82%	2,595	50.96%	215	4.22%
1928	2,350	51.47%	2,194	48.05%	22	0.48%
1932	1,410	33.53%	2,738	65.11%	57	1.36%
1936	1,940	40.65%	2,768	58.01%	64	1.34%
1940	2,329	48.65%	2,435	50.87%	23	0.48%
1944	2,058	48.74%	2,158	51.11%	6	0.14%
1948	1,693	40.77%	2,451	59.02%	9	0.22%
1952	2,123	50.24%	2,093	49.53%	10	0.24%
1956	1,735	45.91%	2,044	54.09%	0	0.00%
1960	1,899	50.20%	1,884	49.80%	0	0.00%
1964	1,215	35.71%	2,187	64.29%	0	0.00%
1968	1,554	50.06%	1,340	43.17%	210	6.77%
1972	1,918	60.18%	1,269	39.82%	0	0.00%
1976	1,286	46.73%	1,449	52.65%	17	0.62%
1980	1,592	55.49%	1,200	41.83%	77	2.68%
1984	1,485	58.01%	1,075	41.99%	0	0.00%
1988	1,248	52.61%	1,117	47.09%	7	0.30%
1992	798	32.00%	1,070	42.90%	626	25.10%
1996	773	36.70%	990	47.01%	343	16.29%
2000	1,335	61.27%	790	36.26%	54	2.48%
2004	1,352	61.54%	828	37.69%	17	0.77%
2008	1,249	59.53%	793	37.80%	56	2.67%
2012	1,246	64.36%	643	33.21%	47	2.43%
2016	1,525	76.98%	365	18.43%	91	4.59%
2020	1,560	78.63%	388	19.56%	36	1.81%
2024	1,537	80.14%	358	18.67%	23	1.20%

== See also ==
- National Register of Historic Places listings in Scotland County, Missouri
