= Home Guard (United States) =

Militia

- Country: United States
- Type: Volunteer militia
- Role: Local defense
- Wars: American Civil War; World War I

The Home Guard were volunteer militia forces of the United States raised by the several States for local defense during wartime.

== Organization ==
=== Iowa Home Guard ===
Iowa Home Guard companies provided border defense along the Missouri border during the Civil War. During the Battle of Athens, Missouri, Iowa Home Guard companies on the other side of the Des Moines River protected the supply depots.

=== Kentucky Home Guard ===
The Kentucky Home Guard participated in the Battle of Barbourville, Kentucky in September 1861 as well as the Battle of Camp Wildcat and many other skirmishes such as the Battle of Augusta (1862).

=== Missouri Home Guard ===
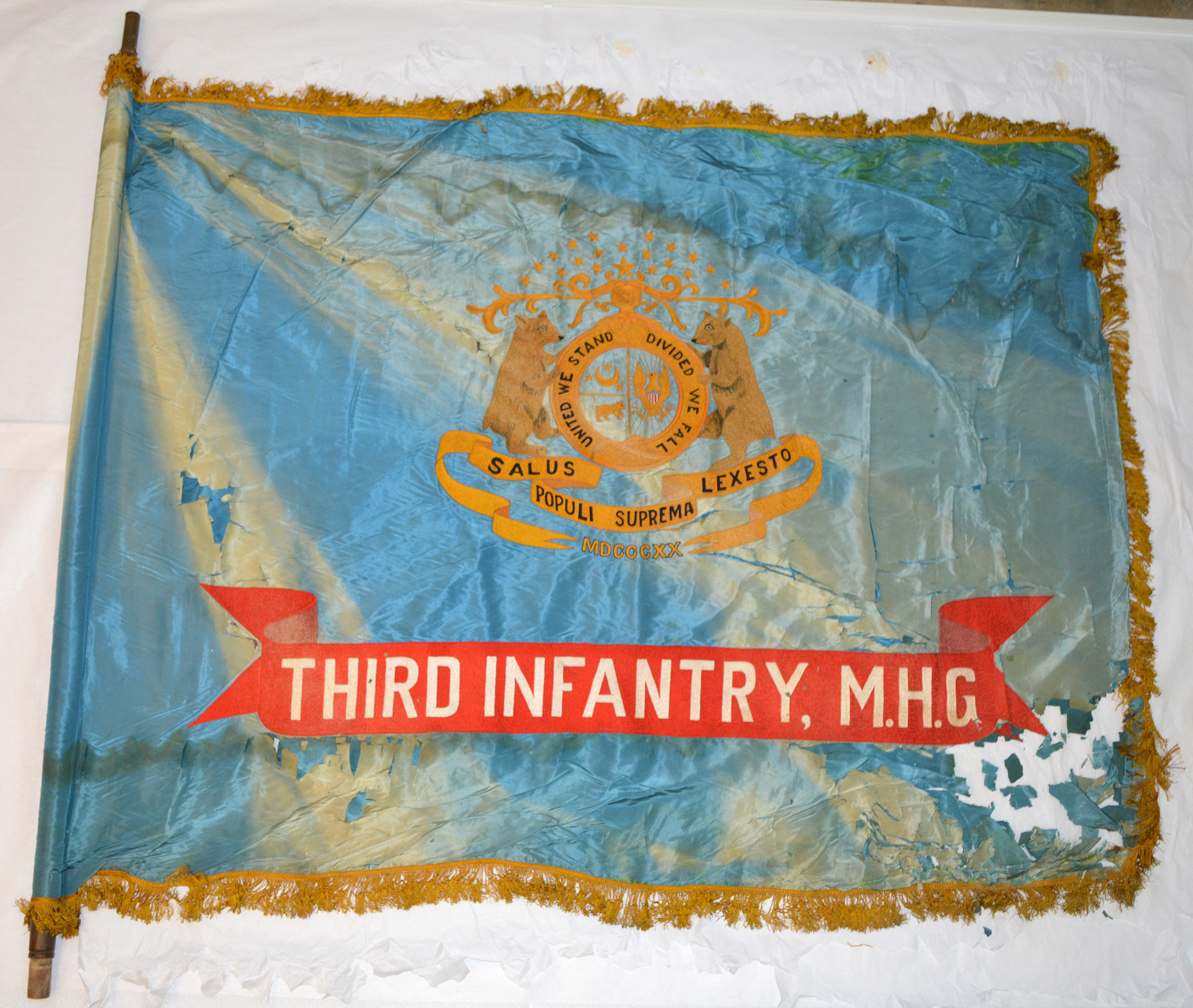
World War I era regimental color of the 3rd Infantry, Missouri Home Guard

In Missouri after the start of the Civil War there were several competing organizations attempting to either take the state out of the Union or keep the state within it. Home Guard companies and regiments were raised by Union supporters, particularly German-Americans, to oppose the secessionist paramilitary Minutemen, secessionist elements in the official Missouri Volunteer Militia and eventually the secessionist Missouri State Guard. Many of the Home Guard regiments in the St. Louis area were raised from pre-existing Wide Awakes, a Republican Party organization established during the 1860 election, and from members of the German Turnverein cultural organization.

St. Louis Unionists were mustered into Federal service in April 1861. Five regiments were designated the 1st–5th Missouri Volunteers and five additional regiments were created as the United States Reserve Corps. The second group were commonly referred to as the (St. Louis) Home Guard, and their creation was criticized as these regiments exceeded the requirement for Missouri volunteers under the Militia Act of 1792. During the Price–Harney Truce, Governor Claiborne Jackson and Missouri State Guard commander Major General Sterling Price demanded that the 1st–5th U.S.R.C. be disbanded as illegal organizations. (These regiments continued to serve though the Missouri Secession Crisis, later being converted into three-year regiments.)

Once actual hostilities began in the state in June 1861, Union loyalists as Home Guard units in areas outside of St. Louis were organized and mobilized by Brigadier General Nathaniel Lyon to oppose Sterling Price's Missouri State Guard, which was forming at the same time. One of these units, the Benton County Home Guards, was defeated by a battalion of Missouri State Guards at the Battle of Cole Camp.

In late 1861 and early 1862 the three-month-service Home Guard were replaced by Unionist militia regiments, including the new Missouri State Militia, as well as the compulsory Enrolled Missouri Militia in July 1862, and the Provisional Enrolled Missouri Militia, formed later. One particularly famous Home Guard militia was that of Columbia, Missouri. In 1864, it was rumored that Price, by then a Confederate general, was planning on turning his march through Missouri towards the staunchly pro-Union town. Columbia had value not only as a stronghold of pro-Union thought, but served as home to a garrison of Union troops and prison located in the library and main academic building at the University of Missouri. Worried about Price's raid and concerned about the presence of bushwhackers in the surrounding areas of pro-Confederate Boone County, 90 men assembled a militia named the Fighting Tigers of Columbia. The brigade stockpiled weapons, kept watch, set up a warning bell for the town, and dug a moat around the city courthouse. The University of Missouri's athletic programs are named in honor of the militia.

=== Western Virginia Home Guard ===
Union supporting Home Guards in Pendleton County, Virginia (in the mountains of what is now the Eastern Panhandle of West Virginia) attacked Confederate works and small detachments with indifferent success during the war. The best known of these irregulars called themselves the "Swamp Dragons".

=== Indian Territory Home Guard ===
Union volunteer infantry regiments known as the Indian Home Guard were recruited from the Five Civilized Tribes in the Indian Territory. Although the tribal leadership had supported the Confederacy, many of the tribal members did not.
