= 1st Northeast Missouri Cavalry Regiment =

1st Northeast Missouri Cavalry (Confederate)
- 1st Northeast Missouri Cavalry Regiment flag
- Active: Summer of 1862-1863
- Country: Confederate States of America
- Allegiance: Missouri
- Branch: Confederate States Army
- Type: Cavalry
- Role: Direct action Raiding; Skirmisher
- Size: Regiment ≥700 (July 1862)
- Nickname: Porter's Regiment
- Engagements: American Civil War: Battle of Cherry Grove; Battle of Memphis; Battle of Vassar Hill; Battle of Florida; Battle of Santa Fe; Battle of Moore's Mill; Battle of Newark; Battle of Kirksville; Battle of Panther Creek; Palmyra Raid; The Emilie Incident; Battle of Hartville

Commanders
- Colonel of the Regiment: Colonel Joseph C. Porter
- Notable commanders: Lieutenant Colonel William C. Blanton; Lieutenant Colonel Frisby McCullough; Major Elliott D. Majors; Captain James W. Porter; Captain Benjamin M. Ely; Lieutenant Morris B. Gibbons

The 1st Northeast Missouri Cavalry, or 1st NE Missouri Cavalry, was a Confederate Army bushwhacker regiment during the American Civil War that operated primarily in northeastern and central Missouri. It’s commander and founder, Colonel Joseph C. Porter, led troops through battles such as the Battle of Moore's Mill and the Battle of Kirksville. The men of this unit were known for guerrilla warfare and labeled as bushwhackers.

== Formation ==
Likeness of Col. Joseph C. Porter

Lt. Col. Frisby McCullough

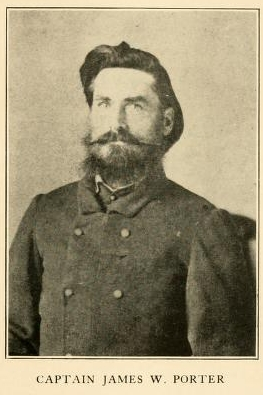
Capt. James W. Porter, Company A

After the Battle of Pea Ridge in March 1862, General Sterling Price ordered Porter to return home and recruit throughout northeast Missouri.

Lieutenant Morris B. Gibbons helped Colonel Porter recruit local farm boys for the Confederate cause in the summer of 1862.

Captain Benjamin M. Ely stated during his parole letter that he was sworn into service by Captain James W. Porter for 12 months while Colonel Porter was camped six miles east of Paris, Missouri. He also stated that Company F was armed with rifles and shotguns at the time.

After the Battle of Kirksville, Lt. Col. Frisby McCullough, who was later tried and sentenced to death as a bushwhacker, was captured wearing a regular Confederate uniform and carrying letters authorizing him to recruit troops.

== Battle of Cherry Grove ==
This battle was in Marion County, Missouri.

== Battle of Memphis ==
This battle was on June 6, 1862, in Scotland County, Missouri.

== Battle of Vassar Hill ==
This battle was on July 19, 1862, and was the largest Civil War battle in Scotland County of North East Missouri.

The battle took place on a wooden bridge over the North Fork of the Fabius River. The Pierce's Mill area is a few hundred yards to the northwest and upstream of the bridge crossing. Oak Ridge is south across and all along the bottom land/timbered hill interface running northwest to southeast following the stream valley.

The Battle of Vassar Hill was fought between the Federal forces of Missouri and the confederates. Col. Porter assembled his 125 riders at Memphis, gave them the plan/orders of the day and rode to the Pierce's Mill area. Looking for Porter's riders was a 280-man Federal detachment composed of a battalion of the 11th Missouri Cavalry (the Merrill Horse) and a detachment of the 11th MO State Militia. Major Clopper was in command of the Federal riders.

== Battle of Florida ==
This battle was on July 22, 1862, in Monroe County, Missouri.

== Battle of Santa Fe ==
This battle was on July 24, 1862, in Monroe County, Missouri.

== Battle of Moore's Mill ==
On July 28, 1862, a Union cavalry unit was ambushed by Confederate forces during a four hour period in Callaway County, Missouri, resulting in a Union victory. Colonel Porter entered the area near Auxvasse Creek and positioned his troops east of Moore’s Mill-Galbreath Mill Road. One Confederate recollection later described the men fighting directly in front of the Union artillery. On August 8th, 1862, The Missouri Statesman published an article called “Further Particulars of the Battle of Moore’s Mill” describing the battle and it’s casualties.

Confederate veteran R.K. Phillips stated after the war that the day after the Battle of Moore’s Mill, Company F was organized at Glenn’s Mill on the Middle Fork of Salt River, east of Paris, Missouri and that Stephen D. Ely was promoted to Orderly Sergeant.

Missouri’s Civil War Heritage Foundation had archaeologists investigate the battlefield for artifacts in March of 2013. They unearthed artillery shells, small-arms bullets, fragments, and other objects that were distinct to Union and Confederate troops.

== Battle of Newark ==
This battle was on August 1, 1862, in Knox County, Missouri.

== Battle of Kirksville ==
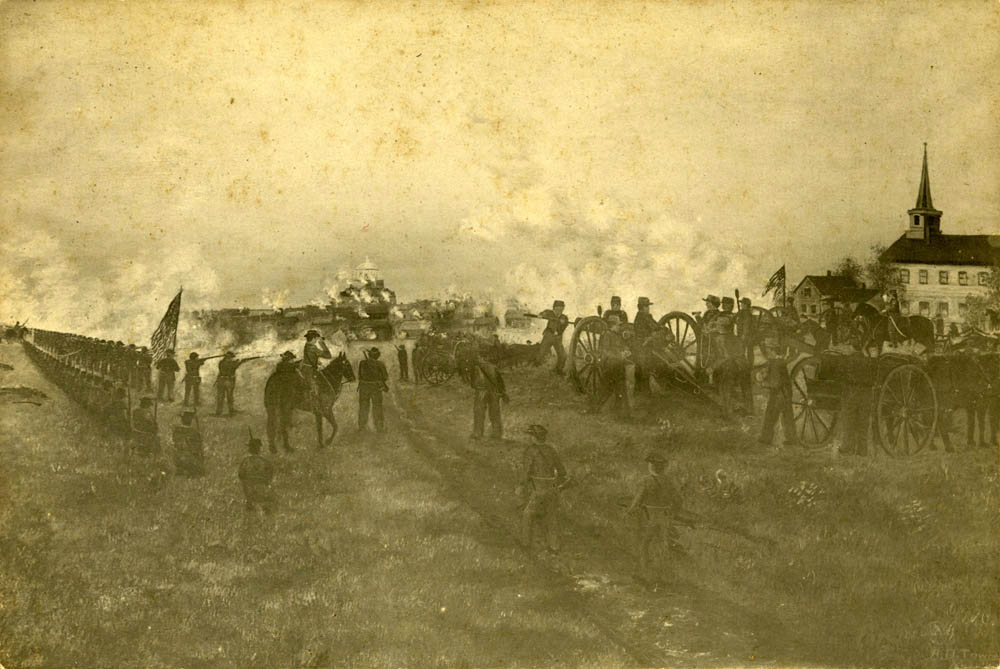
A. D. Towne’s painting of the Battle of Kirksville

This battle was on August 6, 1862, in Kirksville, Adair County, Missouri with a Union victory. Captain Mathias Cain, commander of Confederate irregulars of Schuyler County, sent word to Colonel Porter that he held Kirksville. Their combined force consisted of approximately 2,000 troops. 500 of which were well equipped and 1,000 were unarmed. Porter arrived before noon on August 6th, 1862 with the battle reportedly taking place between 10AM and 1PM, just three hours long. Many of the residents of Kirksville evacuated that same morning. Two civilians were listed as killed.

== Battle of Panther Creek ==
This skirmish, also known as the Battle of Painter Creek, occurred on August 8th, 1862, three miles north of Stockton, Missouri. Colonel Porter’s troops faced 250 men of the 1st Missouri State Militia Cavalry. After skirmishing for about 3 hours, Porter retreated northeast.

The next day on August 9th, 1862, 500 troops of the 1st Missouri State Militia Cavalry, 1st Infantry, and 5th Missouri State Militia Cavalry caught up to Colonel Porter at Walnut Creek, in Adair County and drove his forces to Sear’s Ford on the Chariton River. Colonel Porter directed his troops to cut down large trees before the crossing the river to prevent the pursuing Union cavalry from using cannons. Union Colonel James McFerran later wrote that they fired a few rounds of canister shot and dispersed the confederate forces. While crossing the swift and high river, the rear guard led by Captain James W. Porter was ambushed which led to a 20 minute skirmish. Afterwards, the regiment was disbanded into companies and directed to go back to it’s home county until a later date. Company F then marched along the edge of Ralls County. Union Colonel McFerran also wrote that they did not pursue Porter’s Regiment across the river due to not being able to cross with their artillery and ammunition, but instead would reunite with Union Brigadier General Benjamin F. Loan on August 13th, 1862.

== Palmyra Raid ==
On September 12, 1862, Colonel Porter and 400 of his troops raided in Palmyra, Missouri, sustaining one soldier dying and one wounded. Their mission was to free imprisoned Confederate prisoners of war from the Palmyra jail and to draw Union forces away from the Missouri River. Confederate forces captured Union local Andrew Alsman, a 60 year old carpenter. Another local and three Union troops died during the raid as well. After the raid, Col Porter released Alsman, seeing his capture as a liability. Alsman departed camp and was never seen again. Speculation is that he was taken into the woods in northern Marion County or southern Lewis County and shot. Lieutenant Morris B. Gibbons was captured during the raid and held at the Palmyra jail before he and others escaped using a file that was left in a casket they were using to sleep in.

Porter’s raid and Alsman’s disappearance later resulted in the Palmyra Massacre on October 18th, 1862 where ten Confederate prisoners of war were executed.

== The Emilie Incident ==
Around September 1st, 1862, Captain Benjamin M. Ely of Company F received a letter from Colonel Porter, telling him to collect his men and to report to him in Calloway County. Once Captain Ely arrived at the Auxvasse Creek, Porter was not there. Company F then remained within 15 miles of Fulton, Missouri for four weeks before Colonel Porter joined them and ordered Captain Ely to cross the Missouri River.

On October 16th, 1862, the Emilie stopped sailing up the river to put two men ashore near Portland, Missouri when a group of confederate cavalrymen concealed behind a woodpile took possession of the steamboat. The Emilie was carrying salt and a few passengers. Captain Joseph LaGrange was compelled to ferry 175 men and just as many horses across the Missouri River before being forced to unload his deck freight of salt on the bank. Right after the steamboat began to cross the river, a group of Union cavalrymen from the 1st Missouri State Militia Cavalry arrived just too late to stop the operation. Before letting the Emilie go, they took two or three Union overcoats and proceeded to march to Fort Smith, Arkansas.

== Battle of Hartville ==
This battle took place from January 9th-11th, 1863, in Wright County, Missouri.

== See also ==
- List of Missouri Confederate Civil War units
