= 2nd Northeast Cavalry (Franklin's Regiment) =

2nd Northeast Missouri Cavalry (Confederate)
- Active: Summer 1862
- Country: Confederate States of America
- Allegiance: Confederate States Army
- Branch: Cavalry
- Type: Partisan Cavalry / Recruiting Regiment
- Size: Regiment
- Part of: Trans-Mississippi Department
- Nickname: Franklin's Regiment
- Engagements: American Civil War: Battle of Kirksville; Battle of Newark

2nd Northeast Missouri Cavalry (also known as Franklin's Regiment) was a temporary Confederate States Army cavalry regiment organized in northeast Missouri during the summer of 1862. Formed primarily as a recruiting unit behind enemy lines, the regiment was heavily engaged in partisan skirmishes before suffering severe casualties and dispersing following the Battle of Kirksville.

== History ==
=== Formation ===
In the summer of 1862, Confederate authorities authorized recruiters to slip past Union lines into northern Missouri to raise troops from the sympathetic civilian population. Among these recruiters was Cyrus Franklin, a resident of Lewis County, Missouri, who was commissioned as a colonel.

Operating under the broad command of Colonel Joseph C. Porter, Franklin raised a regiment of partisan cavalry primarily from Lewis, Marion, and neighboring northeast counties. The unit was loosely structured, largely un-mustered into regular Confederate service, and suffered from a severe lack of proper firearms and ammunition.

=== Operations and Disbandment ===
Throughout July and August 1862, Franklin's Regiment operated alongside Porter's forces, conducting raids on Union supply lines and capturing federal outposts, including a notable skirmish at Newark, Missouri.

On August 6, 1862, the regiment was cornered alongside Porter's main force by Union Colonel John McNeil at the Battle of Kirksville. Armed largely with shotguns and hunting rifles, Franklin's men attempted to defend the town's perimeter but were overwhelmed by superior Union artillery and disciplined cavalry charges.

Following the decisive defeat at Kirksville, the regiment fractured. On August 11, 1862, the remnants of the unit were officially disbanded or consolidated into the 1st Northeast Missouri Cavalry. Many captured members of the unit faced harsh treatment or execution by Union authorities, who viewed the un-mustered recruits as unlawful guerillas rather than regular prisoners of war.

== Commander ==
- Colonel Cyrus Franklin – An active partisan recruiter who survived the war and later relocated to Iowa.

== See Also ==
- List of Confederate units from Missouri in the American Civil War
- Missouri in the American Civil War
