= Brown's Arkansas Battery =

Brown's Arkansas Artillery Battery (Confederate)
- Active: 1862–1863
- Country: Confederate States of America
- Allegiance: CSA
- Branch: Artillery
- Nickname: the Newton Artillery
- Engagements: American Civil War Marmaduke's First Missouri Expedition Battle of Clark's Mill Battle of Hartville Marmaduke's Second Missouri Expedition Battle of Chalk Bluff Battle of Cape Girardeau

Commanders
- `1862-1863: Captain Louis W. Brown

The Brown's Arkansas Artillery Battery (1862–1863) was a Confederate Army artillery battery during the American Civil War. It was also known as the Newton Artillery. The battery operated in the Confederate Department of the Trans-Mississippi for its entire existence.

== Organization ==
When General Thomas C. Hindman arrived in Arkansas in late May, 1862 to assume command of the new Trans-Mississippi District, he found almost nothing to command. He quickly began organizing new regiments, but his most pressing need was for arms for the new forces he was organizing, including the artillery. One of his first acts was to order General Albert Pike, commanding the Indian Territory, to return Woodruff's Battery, also known as the Weaver Light Artillery to Arkansas. Louis W. Brown first had been elected Second Lieutenant in Capitan William E. Woodruff's militia battery, then known as the Totten Light Artillery on December 20, 1860, and he was still serving as a lieutenant in Woodruff's battery at the time of this transfer. Woodruff's Battery was utilized to provide the officer cadre for several new batteries in the summer of 1862. Brown was promoted to captain and ordered to command a battery to be organized from details from the infantry regiments of Brigadier General James H. McBride's brigade.

HEADQUARTERS TRANS-MISSISSIPPI DISTRICT,
Little Rock, Ark., August 1, 1862.
Special Orders, No. 42.

Capt. L. W. Brown will report immediately to Brig. Gen. J. H. McBride, at his headquarters at or near Batesville, to command a company of artillery for service with his brigade. General McBride will, if he finds it necessary, make details from his infantry, to form such a company, of one hundred and twenty men.

By command of Major-General Hindman,
R. C. NEWTON,
Chief of Staff.

Head Quarters Trans Miss District
Little Rock Arks
Aug 1st 1862.
General:
General [Thomas C.] Hindman directs me to say to you that he has a battery of four guns, now being equipped, which he intends for your command, and will send as soon as ready to be moved. - Capt brown, the bearer of this, is to command the battery. - It will be necessary for you to provide him, with men, which you will do by detailing them from the different companies of infantry you have with you. - By the time the company is thus made up, and organized, it is hoped the guns will be readiness to be shipped. Of this, due notice will be given you. -
Very Respectfully
R.C. Newton A.A. Genl
Brig Genl [James H.] McBride Comdg &c Batesville [Arkansas]

William J. Leonard was appointed Jr 1st Lieutenant of Captain Brown's Artillery Company by Special Order No. 69, effective July 17, 1862. Another former member of Woodruff's battery, Sergeant Henry Halliburton was promoted to serve as Second Lieutenant of Captain Brown's battery.

Little is known of this battery, except that it was named the "Newton Artillery" in honor of Col. Robert C. Newton. No muster rolls have ever been located. Historians have assembled a roster of thirty four unit members by examining the muster rolls of the regiments which detailed men to the battery. Most of the thirty-four names which appear in the National Archives records under Brown's Arkansas Battery also can be found in the 27th Arkansas Regiment. Six each came from Companies "G" and "I"; another five were assigned from Company "F". Others appear to be from Companies "A", "B", "C", "E", "H" and "K". Several Missouri men from Co B, Matlock's Ark Regiment, joined the battery. They previously had been members of Jeffers' Mo Independent Cavalry Company, the Swamp Rangers. One of them, Joseph Coker, later wrote a short paper, which is part of the Thomas Ewing Family Papers, Library of Congress. Cooker traces some of his experiences during the war, including a little on his service in Brown's Battery. The transfer of men from the 26th Arkansas to Brown's Battery was made permanent "by order of Gen. Hindman" as of August 12, 1862. This was also the date that transfers of men to other batteries (Hart's, etc.) were made permanent. It is also, coincidentally, the date of a reorganization of regiments in Arkansas in which new elections of officers were held, and some companies were shifted around, consolidated, etc.

== Service ==
By October 18, 1862, Brown's Arkansas Battery, with four iron 6-pounder guns was located at Pittman's Ferry, in Randolph County, Arkansas, with Colonel Colton Green's Missouri Cavalry Regiment.

In early November, the battery was assigned to a small brigade of Missouri Cavalry, including the 3rd Missouri Cavalry Regiment, commanded by Colonel John Q. Burbridge. Under Burbridge's command, the battery fought at the Battle of Clark's Mill on November 7, 1862 in Douglas County, Missouri. Battery Member Joseph Coker described the battery's participation in the Battle of Clark's Mill.

...in November, 1862, while Burbridges regiment was ordered to proceed from Bennetts Bayou, Ark., and surprise and capture a small post, (the name of which I cannot recall) located in Douglas or Wright County, Mo., I remember this expedition as the severest of my war experiences. We broke camp at eight A. M., and it was said marched seventy-five miles and attacked the post at eight A. M. the next day. The battery was light artillery, and the cannoneers were supposed to be mounted but they were not; only those acting as drivers, three to each gun and the Sargeant in charge of the detachment. Two men could ride on the limbers, and the others were told to take turns with them and the drivers, when tired of walking.... After several miles of weary, but rapid marching, that showed the officers confidence, and encouraged the men, we came in sight of the post and attacked it at once. The post consisted of a block house surrounded by palisades and was defended by a battalion of home guards, a small detachment of regular volunteers, and two toy cannon. At the second or third round from our battery they run up a white flag, and called for a conference, which resulted in their surrender as prisoners of war.

General Thomas C. Hindman congratulated Burnbridge's command on their achievement;

Hd Qrs & Camp near Ft Smith [Arkansas]
Nov 17th 1862.
General Orders No 23.
On the morning of the 6th inst, Col Jno [John] Q. Burbridge commanding brigade of Cavalry [4th Missouri Cavalry] at Yellville Arkansas, with a force of Three Hundred & Seventy five (375) Missouri Cavalry, and one section of [Louis W.] Brown's Arkansas battery, surprised a force of the enemy of about the same strength, strongly intrenched at "Clark Mills," Douglas County, Missouri. After an engagement of one hour and a half, a portion of the enemy retreated, and the balance surrendered. One Hundred and fifty prisoners, two pieces of artillery, with a large quantity of ammunition, two hundred stand of durable arms, one hundred and twenty head of horses and mules, seven large arms wagons, and all the camp and garrison equipage, cavalry equipment, and quartermasters and commissary stores of the enemy, fell into the hands of our troops. The Major General Commanding congratulates Col Burbridge and his command upon this brilliant achievement, and commends it to the emulation of all officers, and soldiers of this army corps.
By Command of Maj Genl [Thomas C.] Hindman
R [Robert] C Newton A.A. Genl [Assistant Adjutant General]

By December 1862, the battery, now apparently reduced to two guns, was assigned to Colonel Joseph C. Porter's Missouri Cavalry Brigade during General John S. Marmaduke's December 1862 through January 1863 expedition through southern Missouri. This movement was two-pronged. Col. Porter led one column, comprising his Missouri Cavalry Brigade, out of Pocahontas, Arkansas, to assault Union posts around Hartville, Missouri. When he neared Hartville on January 9, he sent a detachment forward to reconnoiter. It succeeded in capturing the small militia garrison. The same day, Porter moved toward Marshfield. On January 10, some of Porter's men raided other Union installations in the area before making contact with Marmaduke's column east of Marshfield. Marmaduke had received reports of Union troops approaching to surround him and prepared for a confrontation. Early on the morning of January 11 the Confederates under Porter made contact with Union Col. Samuel Merrill 's scouts and skirmishing commenced. Merrill marched his force directly to Hartville where it took a strong defensive position on covered, high ground west of the courthouse. Shelby and Porter's brigades attempted to dislodge Merrill's force, but it was too strongly positioned. Over a four-hour period several Confederate assaults were made, each being repulsed in turn. Eventually Merrill withdrew most of his force. Both sides claimed victory in the Battle of Hartville. Marmaduke was compelled to make a rapid retreat into Arkansas and then an arduous trek to winter camp.

In the winter of 1862-3, we make a second rain into Mo., and had a hard fight at Hartville, in which out battery suffered severely. The first man killed was Charley Alexander, a Cape [Girardeau] County boy, shot through the heart while charging into town at the head of the column. A preacher named Smith, who rode and drove the wheIel span on one of the guns was shot through the chest as we were going into battle, but he would not leave his post until after calling" "Boys, I am shot through and must die, come quick and take the horses or they will run off with the limber," fell dead when relieved.

What became of the battery following Marmadukes' First Missouri Expedition is unclear. It is possible that Brown's Battery also participated in General Marmaduke's Second Missouri Expedition. In April 1863, there is a reference to Brown's Battery of Greene's Brigade in a General Order No. 10., issued by General Holmes, which refers to the court martial of one of the battery's soldiers for offences committed in February 1863 when the battery was stationed at Batesville, Arkansas. The battery is listed as belonging to Colonel Colton Greene's Missouri Cavalry Brigade of Brigadier General Marmaduke's Missouri Cavalry Division as of May 20, 1863, with the added comment "ordered to Little Rock". The battery virtually disappears from the records at that point. Brown's Battery is not mentioned in Marmaduke's report of the raid, however, Marmaduke's report does mention that his force included that eight field pieces and two mountain guns. It is assumed that Collins's battery of Shelby's Brigade had four cannons, and it is likely that Pratt's battery of Carter's Brigade of Texans also had four pieces. That does not account for the two other weapons he reported having on the raid. These could be the two pieces of Brown's Battery attached to Greene's Brigade. The battery is listed as being assigned to Greene's Brigade on May 20, 1863, immediately after the raid. General Marmaduke began his second raid into Missouri from Northeast Arkansas on April 18, 1863. During the raid, he intended to obtain much-needed supplies for his troops, several hundred of whom were unarmed and un-mounted. Marmaduke organized his division of about 5,000 men into two columns, each made up of two brigades. Colonel George W. Carter led one of the columns, which consisted of a brigade led by Colonel Colton Greene and the other by Carter himself. The second column was led by Colonel Joseph O. Shelby and consisted of Shelby's famous "Iron Brigade," commanded by Colonel George W. Thompson, and another brigade commanded by Colonel John Q. Burbridge. In all, the division had between eight and ten pieces of artillery. Following an unsuccessful attack on the heavily fortified city of Cape Girardeau on April 26, 1863, Marmaduke began a retreat to Arkansas, conducting a rear guard action at the Battle of Chalk Bluff on May on May 1 and May 2, 1863 while he crossed his forces back into Arkansas.

== Disbanded ==
References to Brown's Battery become very scarce following Marmadukes Second Expedition to Missouri. The May 20, 1863 report of the battery's assignment to Greene's Brigade includes a note that the battery had been ordered to Little Rock. It may be that the battery was ordered to Little Rock to be disbanded. General Holmes issued Special Order No. 23, District of Arkansas, dated April 11, 1863, which appears to have ordered the transfer of 17 members of Brown's Battery who had originally been transferred from Shaler's 27th Arkansas Infantry Regiment to return to their unit. These men are counted as present on the regiment's muster rolls in for April/May 1863. Six other unit members had been discharged from the service on March 23, 1863. While these figures only account for 23 of the 120 men originally ordered to be transferred to the battery from McBride's Brigade in the summer of 1862, they seem to point to the conclusion that the battery was disbanded in April/May 1863. The unit is not mentioned again in the Official Records of the Union and Confederate Armies.

== See also ==
- List of Confederate units from Arkansas
- Confederate Units by State
