= Battle of Kirksville =

Battle of the American Civil War

- Part of the Trans-Mississippi Theater of the American Civil War
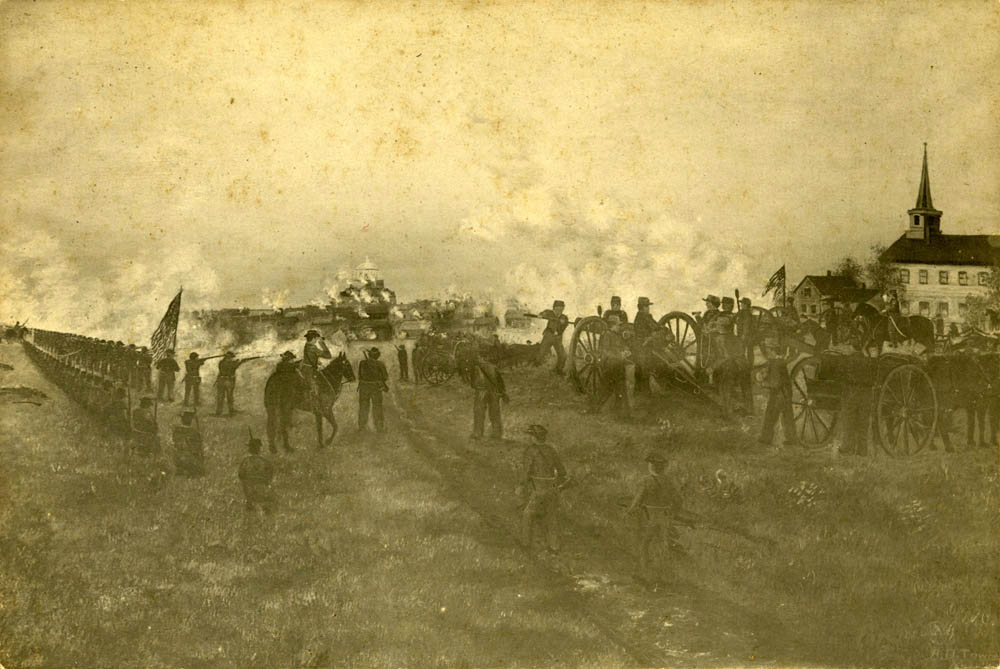
- Artist rendering of the Battle of Kirksville.
Date	August 6, 1862
Location	Adair County, Missouri 40.1951°N 92.5837°W
Result	Union victory

Belligerents
United States (Union)	(Confederate States of America) CSA (Confederacy)

Commanders and leaders
John McNeil	Joseph C. Porter

Strength
1,000	2,500

Casualties and losses
88	368

The Battle of Kirksville took place during the American Civil War and was fought in the town of Kirksville, Missouri, on August 6, 1862. The Union victory helped consolidate Federal control over northeastern Missouri.

== Battle ==
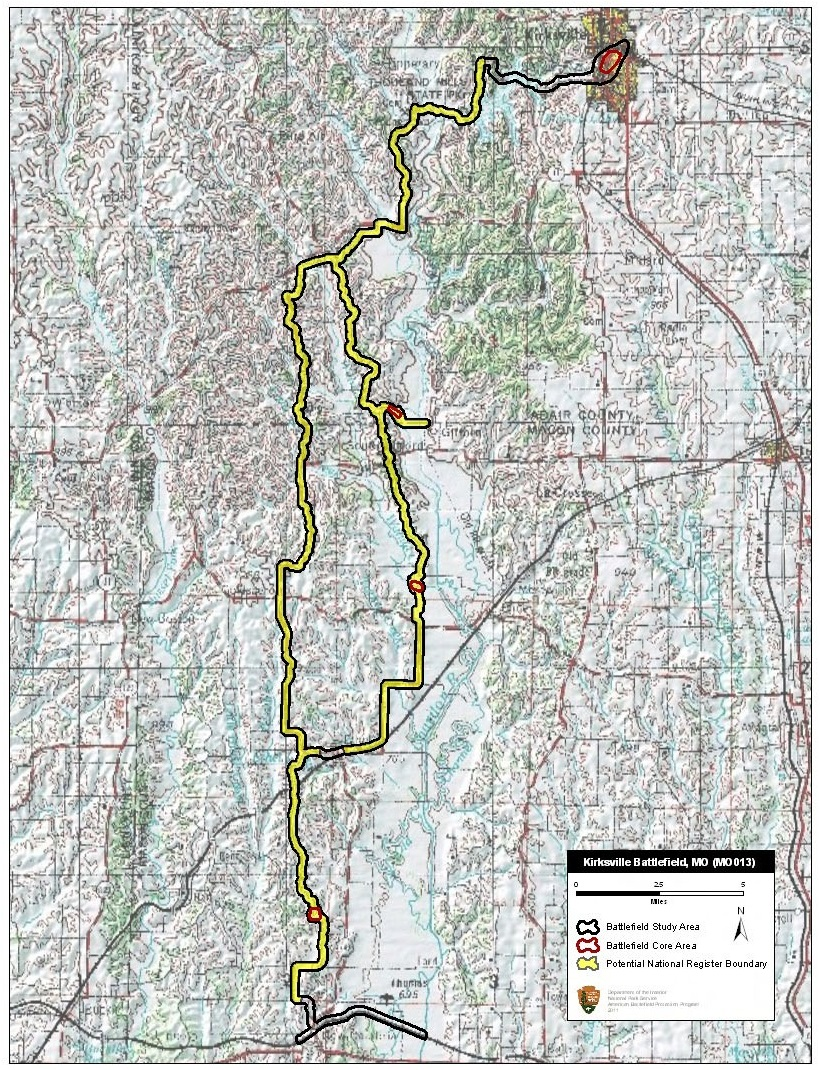
Map of Kirksville Battlefield core and study areas by the American Battlefield Protection Program

Confederate Col. Joseph C. Porter had been recruiting in the Macon area, to the south of Kirksville. He had assembled the 2nd Northeast Cavalry ( a brigade of between 1,500 and 2,500 ill-trained and poorly equipped troops), but his irregulars had harried and recruited as far north as Memphis, Missouri. Confederate sympathies in the Kirksville area were high (though Union sentiment was stronger than in surrounding counties), due to the Southern heritage of most of the residents. Porter had been urged to come to Kirksville by Confederate Captain Tice Cain, an Adair County farmer who claimed to be holding Kirksville with 500 fresh recruits. (In one of the battle's mysteries, Cain disappeared and was never heard from again, according to a descendant.)

Union Colonel John McNeil of the 2nd Missouri Cavalry Regiment and his troops, totalling about 1,000, had been pursuing Porter for more than a week. Before noon on August 6, McNeil attacked Porter in the town of Kirksville, where the Confederates had concealed themselves in homes and stores and among the crops in the nearby fields, especially in the county courthouse and the commercial buildings on the square. Their presence was discovered by a Union detachment that volunteered to ride around the square in order to draw fire and cause the Confederates to reveal themselves — an act of courage which cost two Union soldiers their lives. McNeil deployed his artillery before moving in a broad line towards the town square. The subsequent cannon fire demoralized the defenders, some of whom retreated behind a rail fence, west of the square.

The Union troops then advanced in two wings, with Lt. Col. William F. Shaffer of the 2nd Missouri in command of the Union right wing and Major Henry Clay Caldwell of the 3rd Iowa Cavalry Regiment in charge of the left. As the two wings met, they succeeded in driving the Confederates from the courthouse. Porter's remaining forces yielded ground and joined the others behind the rail fence. From this position, the Confederates poured heavy fire into McNeil's men, but were ultimately overwhelmed. The battle began at 11 a.m. and was over by 2 p.m.

The Federals then secured the town, capturing numerous prisoners, and driving away the remaining Confederates. Three days later, another Union force arrived and finished the work begun at Kirksville, virtually destroying Porter's command.

== Aftermath ==
According to a letter by resident J. Martin, written a week after the battle, Confederate dead numbered about 200; Union 30. McNeill's official tally was 150 Confederates killed (300-400 wounded) against 6 Union deaths (32 wounded). Two civilian casualties were noted: James Dye, a sixty-year-old farmer with two sons in the Union army, was held overnight by Porter during his approach to the town, then told to be on his way, but shot as he left. The other was Mrs. Elizabeth Cutts (also given as "Kutz" and "Coots"). Most Kirksville residents had heeded Porter's warning to depart, but Cutts was shot when two Confederate soldiers attempted to enter the cellar where she was hiding, and she was hit by a Union bullet meant for them as she ran out.

John L. Porter, a prominent local citizen (no relation to the Confederate leader), asked for and was granted permission to treat the Confederate wounded. McNeil supplied a surgeon and instruments, the departed Porter having previously commandeered all medical equipment. The Confederate dead were deposited in several mass graves in Forest Llewellen Cemetery; a monument now marks the spot. Some were later recovered by their families. Fifteen Confederates were quickly court-martialed on McNeil's orders and shot for having violated previous parole agreements not to take up arms again after being released. Although the execution was permissible within military norms, it was seldom done and McNeil has been criticized for both the justice and necessity of the proceedings, by John L. Porter (see Kirksville Daily Express, 1912, below) and Joseph Mudd (see references to Palmyra massacre), among others.

A number of other questionable shootings followed, including those of Dr. John Davis (said by some to have been told to run and then shot when he did) and Lt. Col. Frisby McCullough — a subordinate of Porter who was tried and sentenced to death as a bushwhacker, even though he was captured wearing a regular Confederate uniform and carrying letters authorizing him to recruit troops. He was granted permission to give the order to fire, and his final words were, "May God forgive you for this cold-blooded murder. Aim at the heart. Fire!" A second volley was necessary.

McNeil's reputation would be darkened further by the "Palmyra Massacre" on October 18, but he would go on to serve two terms as Sheriff of St. Louis County, dying June 7, 1891. Porter died February 18, 1863, of wounds received in an engagement at Hartville.

The victory at Kirksville helped consolidate Union dominance in northeastern Missouri.

Memorial Park (the approximate location of the Union artillery) commemorates the battle.

== Gallery ==
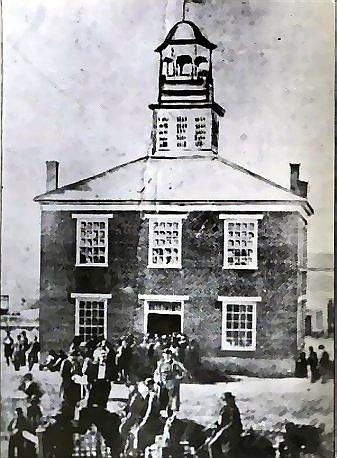
The Adair County Courthouse, used by Confederate sharpshooters during the Battle of Kirksville

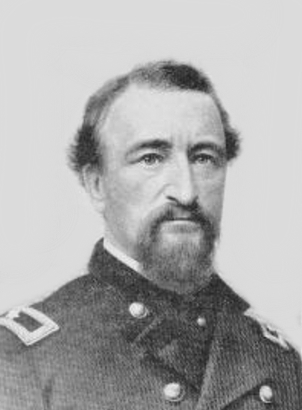
Union commander Col. John McNeil

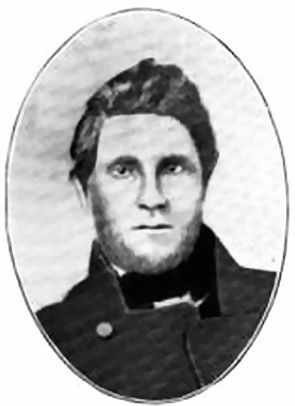
Confederate Lt. Colonel Frisby McCullough, executed following the Battle of Kirksville

== Sources, references and links ==
- National Park Service account
- A Book of Adair County History, Kirksville, The Kirksville-Adair County Bicentennial Committee, 1976.
- A History of Lewis, Clark, Knox and Scotland Counties, Missouri (detailed account from 1887)
- County history
- Contemporary news dispatches
- Eyewitness accounts, and E.M. Violette's detailed history, from the Kirksville Daily Express Fiftieth Anniversary coverage
- List of casualties
- CWSAC Report Update
