= Cyrus Franklin =

American politician, lawyer, and military officer

- Born: August 9, 1822; Highland, Ohio
- Died: February 17, 1885 (age 63); Osceola, Missouri
- Military career
- Allegiance: United States of America; Confederate States of America
- Service years: 1846–1848; 1862–1865
- Rank: Colonel
- Commands: 2nd Northeast Missouri Cavalry
- Conflicts: Mexican–American War; American Civil War: Battle of Kirksville

Cyrus Franklin (August 9, 1822 – February 17, 1885) was an American politician, lawyer, and military officer who served as a Confederate States Army colonel during the American Civil War.

== Early life and political career ==
Franklin was born in Highland County, Ohio, to Anthony Franklin and Mary Nelson. He served in the Mexican–American War before relocating to Agency, Wapello County, Iowa, in 1848, where he worked as an attorney and served as one of the first town marshals of Ottumwa, Iowa. A member of the Democratic Party, Franklin was elected to the Iowa House of Representatives, serving in the 5th and 6th General Assemblies from December 1854 to January 1858. Following the election of Abraham Lincoln in 1860, Franklin strongly opposed the administration's policies regarding secession.

== Civil War service ==
Following the outbreak of the American Civil War, Franklin threw his support behind the Southern war effort. In the summer of 1862, he crossed into Missouri alongside Joseph C. Porter to recruit pro-Confederate forces behind Union lines. Franklin authorized the recruitment of the 2nd Northeast Missouri Cavalry (frequently called Franklin's Regiment) and assumed command as its colonel. His command saw heavy combat during the summer recruitment campaign, most notably at the Battle of Kirksville on August 6, 1862, where a combined force under Porter and Franklin was decisively defeated by Union forces under Colonel John McNeil. Franklin later crossed the Mississippi River with the remnants of his command to continue operations in the Trans-Mississippi theater.

== Later life and death ==
After the collapse of the Confederacy, Franklin moved to Memphis, Tennessee, and later to Springfield, Missouri, where he resumed his legal career. He died in Osceola, Missouri, on February 17, 1885.
