= Governor Merrill =

Governor Merrill may refer to:

- Samuel Merrill (Iowa governor) (1822–1899), 7th governor of Iowa
- Steve Merrill (1946–2020), 77th governor of New Hampshire
