= 1869 Iowa gubernatorial election =

- October 12, 1869
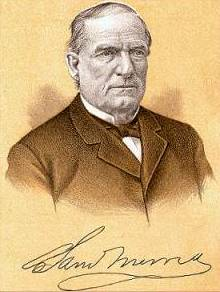

Nominee	Samuel Merrill	George Gillespie
Party	Republican	Democratic
Popular vote	97,243	57,287
Percentage	62.93%	37.07%
- County results Merrill: 50–60% 60–70% 70–80% 80–90% 90–100% Gillespie: 50–60% 60–70% No Data/Votes
Governor before election
Samuel Merrill
Republican
Elected Governor
Samuel Merrill
Republican

The 1869 Iowa gubernatorial election was held on October 12, 1869. Incumbent Republican Samuel Merrill defeated Democratic nominee George Gillespie with 62.93% of the vote.

== General election ==
=== Candidates ===
- Samuel Merrill, Republican
- George Gillespie, Democratic

=== Results ===
1869 Iowa gubernatorial election
Party	Candidate	Votes	%	±%
Republican	Samuel Merrill (incumbent)	97,243	62.93%	
Democratic	George Gillespie	57,287	37.07%	
Majority		39,956		
Turnout				
Republican hold		Swing		
