= 1867 Iowa gubernatorial election =

- October 8, 1867
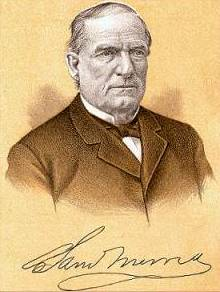

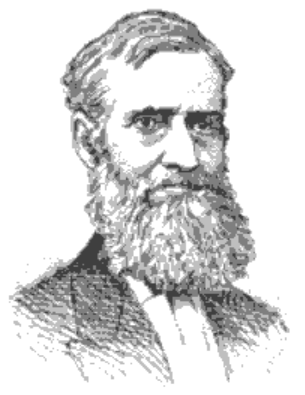
Nominee	Samuel Merrill	Charles Mason
Party	Republican	Democratic
Popular vote	90,204	62,966
Percentage	58.88%	41.10%
- County results Merrill: 50–60% 60–70% 70–80% 80–90% 90–100% Mason: 50–60% 60–70% No Data/Votes
Governor before election
William M. Stone
Republican
Elected Governor
Samuel Merrill
Republican

The 1867 Iowa gubernatorial election was held on October 8, 1867. Republican nominee Samuel Merrill defeated Democratic nominee Charles Mason with 58.88% of the vote.

== General election ==
=== Candidates ===
- Samuel Merrill, Republican
- Charles Mason, Democratic

=== Results ===
1867 Iowa gubernatorial election
Party	Candidate	Votes	%	±%
Republican	Samuel Merrill	90,204	58.88%	
Democratic	Charles Mason	62,966	41.10%	
Majority		27,238		
Turnout				
Republican hold		Swing		
