= 21st Iowa Infantry Regiment =

Union Army military unit

- Iowa state flag
- Active: August 25, 1862, to July 15, 1865
- Country: United States
- Allegiance: Union
- Branch: Infantry
- Equipment: .577 Enfield Rifles
- Engagements: Battle of Hartville (MO); Battle of Port Gibson; Battle of Champion Hill; Battle of Big Black River Bridge; Siege of Vicksburg; Siege of Jackson; Siege of Fort Blakeley; Battle of Spanish Fort

The 21st Iowa Infantry Regiment was an infantry regiment in the Union Army during the American Civil War.

== Service ==
The 21st Iowa Infantry was organized at Camp Franklin, Dubuque, Iowa, and mustered in for three years of Federal service on September 9, 1862.

The regiment left Camp Franklin in Dubuque, Iowa, on September 16, 1862, on board the sidewheel steamer Henry Clay and two barges tied alongside. They spent their first night on Rock Island before continuing the next day, debarked at Montrose due to low water, traveled by train to Keokuk, boarded the Hawkeye State and arrived in St. Louis on September 20, 1862, then moving to Rolla, Missouri, that autumn and then to Houston, Missouri, forming as part of a brigade that included the 21st Iowa, 99th Illinois, and 33rd Missouri regiments as well as detachments from the 3rd Missouri Cavalry, 3rd Iowa Cavalry, and from the 1st Missouri Artillery. This brigade was under the command of Gen. Henry Fitz Warren.

The regiment's first test was at the Battle of Hartville, Missouri, with 262 members of the regiment participating on January 11, 1863. The battle ended with Confederates withdrawing to the south and Federal soldiers to Lebanon before returning to Houston.

Following the expedition in Missouri, the regiment was formed with the 22nd Iowa, 23rd Iowa, and 11th Wisconsin regiments in March, 1863, to form the 2nd Brigade (Lawler's Brigade) of Gen. Carr's Division, of the 13th Army Corps under U.S. Grant to participate in the Vicksburg campaign. The brigade saw action in Mississippi at Port Gibson, Black River Bridge and the Siege of Vicksburg. They were present during the May 16, 1863, Battle of Champion Hill but held out of action by General John McClernand. On May 17, 1863, the 21st and 23d regiments led an assault on entrenched Confederates at the Big Black River bridge, charging out of a meander to the enemy's left flank causing the Rebel defenses at the Black River bridge to collapse and forcing them to retreat. Thus, the path to Vicksburg was now unimpeded resulting in Grant's army enveloping the city.

Lawler's brigade distinguished itself again during the May 22, 1863, assault at Vicksburg. The brigade charged up the slopes toward the Texans waiting at the top in the railroad redoubt. After fierce fighting, the brigade controlled the ridge at the top for a few hours before being driven off. Gen. Grant abandoned his efforts to take Vicksburg by force and settled into a prolonged siege which ended with Gen. Pemberton's surrender of his Confederate forces and the city on July 4, 1863. An impressive memorial near the redoubt honors the Iowans who fought and those who sacrificed themselves in the Vicksburg Campaign.

Following Vicksburg, the regiment was part of a force that marched on Jackson, MS. The regiment then took part in expeditions in Louisiana and then moved to the south coast of Texas at Matagorda Island, Indianola and other nearby locations.

The regiment participated in the Mobile Campaign in the spring of 1865, but did not directly participate in the capitulations of Ft. Blakely and Spanish Fort.

The regiment was mustered out on July 15, 1865, 1865, and discharged at Clinton, Iowa on July 24, 1865.).

== Total strength and casualties ==
The 21st Iowa mustered 1181 men at one time or another during its existence. It suffered 4 officers and 77 enlisted men who were killed in action or who died of their wounds and 1 officer and 168 enlisted men who died of disease, for a total of 250 fatalities.

== Commanders ==
- Colonel Samuel Merrill.
- Lieutenant Colonel C. W. Dunlap
- Lieutenant Colonel Salue Van Anda

== See also ==
- List of Iowa Civil War Units
- Iowa in the American Civil War
