= Frisby McCullough =

American military officer (1828–1862)

Frisby Henderson McCullough
- Born: March 8, 1828; New Castle County, Delaware, U.S.
- Died: August 8, 1862 (aged 34) Kirksville, Missouri, U.S.
- Cause of death: Execution by firing squad
- Allegiance: United States; Missouri; Confederate States
- Branch: United States Volunteers; Missouri State Guard; Confederate States Army
- Conflicts: Siege of Lexington

Frisby Henderson McCullough (March 8, 1828 – August 8, 1862) was a Confederate army soldier in the American Civil War, executed on the orders of Union Colonel (later a general) John McNeil after the Battle of Kirksville.

== Early years ==
Born in New Castle County, Delaware, to James and Delia (Pennington) McCullough, he moved with his parents to Marion County, Missouri at the age of 12. McCullough went to California during the 1849 Gold Rush and remained there for 5 years. On November 26, 1856, he married Eloise Randolph in Marion County. They became the parents of three children, including a son who went on to practice law in Edina, Missouri.

== Military career ==
At the outbreak of the war, McCullough joined the Confederate forces under General Thomas Green. He took part in the Battle of Lexington, before being sent by General Sterling Price to recruit in northeastern Missouri with Joseph C. Porter in the spring of 1862.

During the guerrilla campaign in Northeast Missouri in the summer of 1862, McCullough sought unsuccessfully to persuade Colonel Porter to restrict himself to recruiting and not engage the Union forces. According to one of his men, Joseph Mudd (see references), this was because McCullough feared the retaliation Federal forces would inflict upon civilian Southern sympathizers. The observation may accurately reflect McCullough's character, which is universally praised, but it is colored by the author's Confederate perspective. Prior to the engagement at Kirksville, McCullough again urged Porter to decline battle and send his raw recruits to Arkansas for training and equipping behind Confederate lines. Porter refused and McCullough proposed that Porter at least wait in the cornfields outside of town, instead of fighting in the village itself. Again, his advice was ignored.

== Capture and execution ==
After Porter's disastrous defeat at Kirksville, McCullough became ill. Declining Porter's offer of escort, he rode alone towards Edina to recover and continue recruiting. He was discovered by Federal troops and surrendered.

McCullough requested to be sent to Palmyra, rather than to Kirksville, possibly because he had already heard of the executions of prisoners there, but the request was denied. Although he had been treated well in Edina, according to eyewitnesses he was paraded up and down the streets of Kirksville to jeering crowds. He was accused of lacking a military commission, of fighting on his own authority — that is, of being a bushwhacker— and of persuading parolees to return to Confederate service.

A drumhead court-martial was convened on Friday, August 8, by Lt. Col. W.F. Schaffer of Merrill's Horse. McCullough stated that he had been elected second in command of the regiment of Colonel Cyrus Franklin, but had not yet received his commission. He had also previously held the rank of lieutenant colonel in the Missouri State Guard, but that commission had long since expired. McCullough was found guilty and sentenced to be shot. The officer who read the death sentence did so with tears.

McCullough made two requests before his execution: that he be allowed to write a letter to his wife, and for permission to give the firing squad orders to fire. Both were granted. After being taken west of Kirksville to be executed, he gave the order to the firing squad "What I have done, I have done as a principle of right. Aim at the heart. Fire!" Of the first volley, only one shot hit McCullough, and he survived. He requested for his leg, which had been pinned under him, to be straightened, and was then executed via pistol shots. McCullough's final words were "May God forgive you this cold-blooded murder."

Union Colonel McNeil wrote: "Col. McCullough was tried […] under order No. 2 of General Halleck and Nos. 8 and 18, of General Schofield. He had no commission except a printed paper authorizing 'the bearer' to recruit for the Confederate Army. He was found guilty of bushwhacking, or of being a guerilla. He was a brave fellow, and a splendid specimen of manhood. I would have gladly spared him had my duty permitted. As it was, he suffered the fate that would have fallen to you or to me if we had been found recruiting inside the Confederate lines. He met a soldier's death, as became a soldier."

The intensely pro-Union Palmyra Courier was restrained in its criticism of McCullough: "We have known him personally since he was a boy. He was ever, as a citizen, a high-toned gentleman – really a noble specimen of a man. Brave as a lion, no danger could intimidate him. We doubt whether the rebel ranks contain a more honorable man than he was. Yet his judgment led him to commit the fatal error of taking up arms against his country. He has been one of the most active and vigilant rebels in the Northeast Missouri [sic]. Honorable as he was, however, as a gentleman, he justly merited the fate he received, as a rebel, in unlawful and barbarous warfare against the authorities of the land. Had he engaged in the service of his country with the zeal he evinced against it, he would doubtless have risen to a high position of honor and renown." He was interred at the Ashbury Methodist Church South of Steffenville Mo. The church is no longer there but the cemetery still exists today.

== Evaluation ==
While there may have been some technicalities as to McCullough's commission, he was in fact wearing a Confederate officer's uniform when captured and was acting under orders from General Price. Reaction to his execution was generally negative. It was viewed by many as neither necessary nor just, and may have done more to galvanize pro-Southern sympathies than to discourage activities of the type McCullough was charged with.
