= Fort D =

Coordinates: 37°17′27″N 89°31′35″W

- U.S. National Register of Historic Places
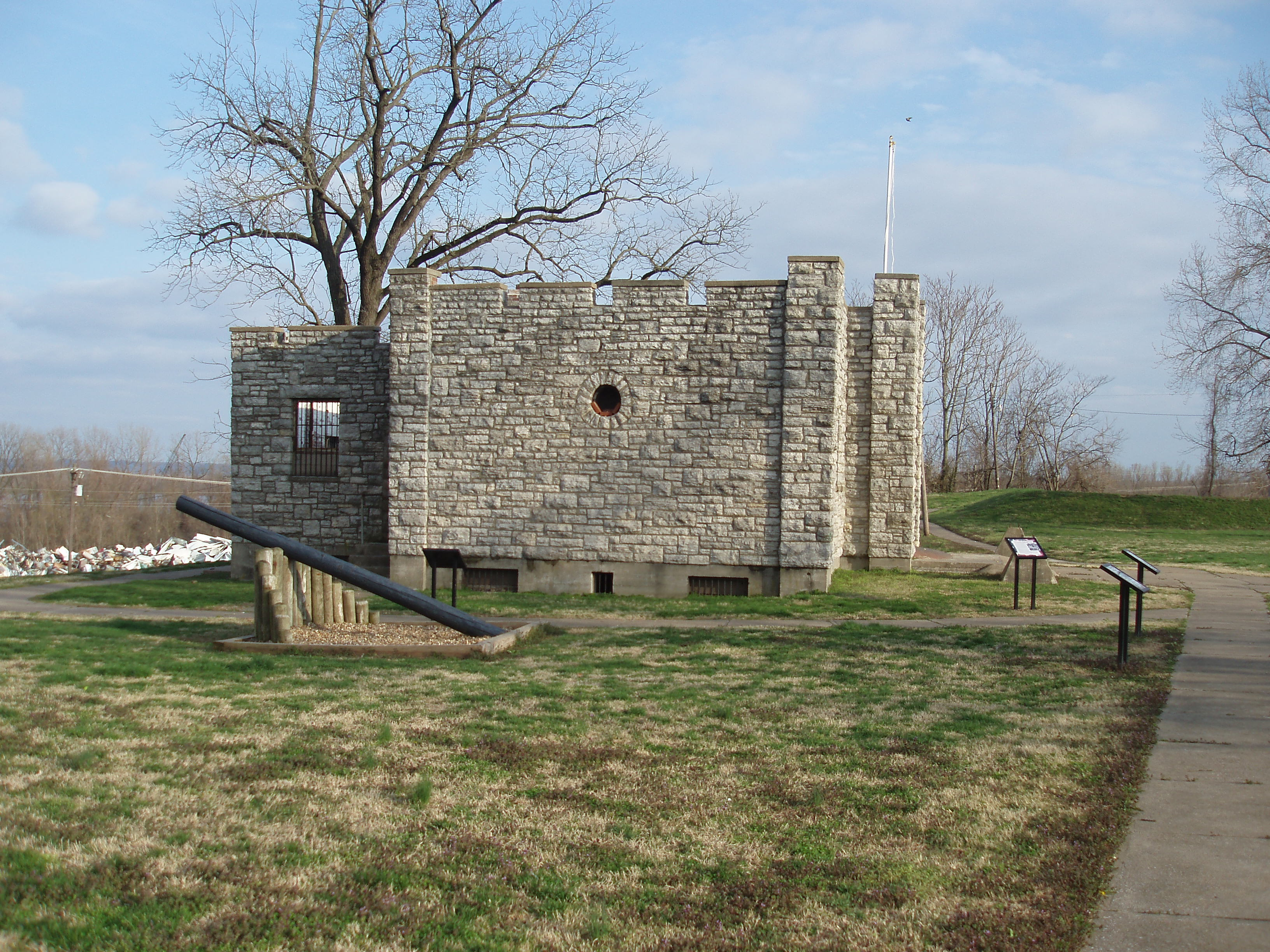
- Location: 920 Fort St; Cape Girardeau, Missouri
- NRHP reference No.: 100004219
- Added to NRHP: August 1, 2019

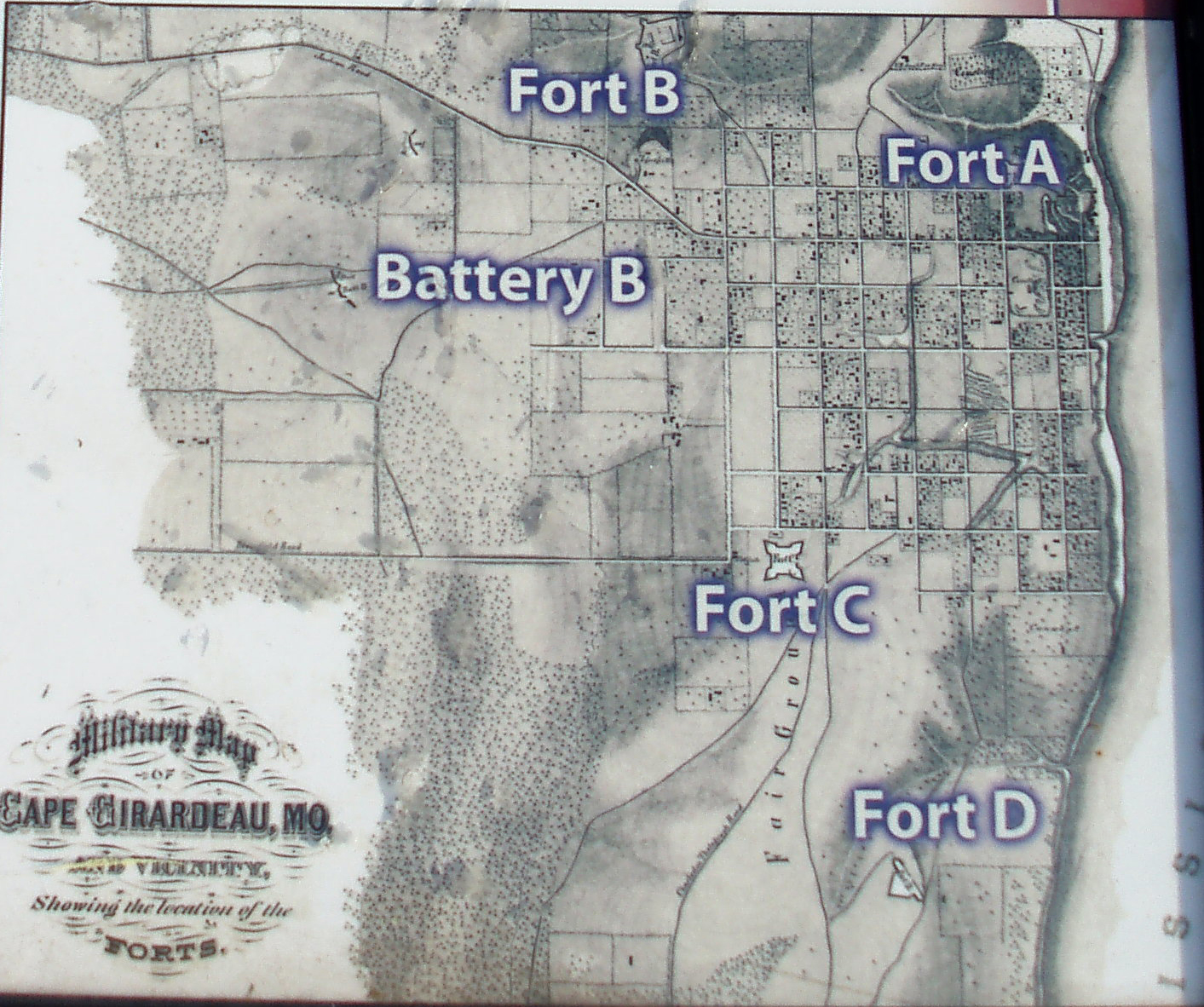
Map of City Forts, Cape Girardeau, Missouri

Fort D is a Civil War-era fort alongside the Mississippi River in Cape Girardeau, Missouri, USA.

== Construction ==
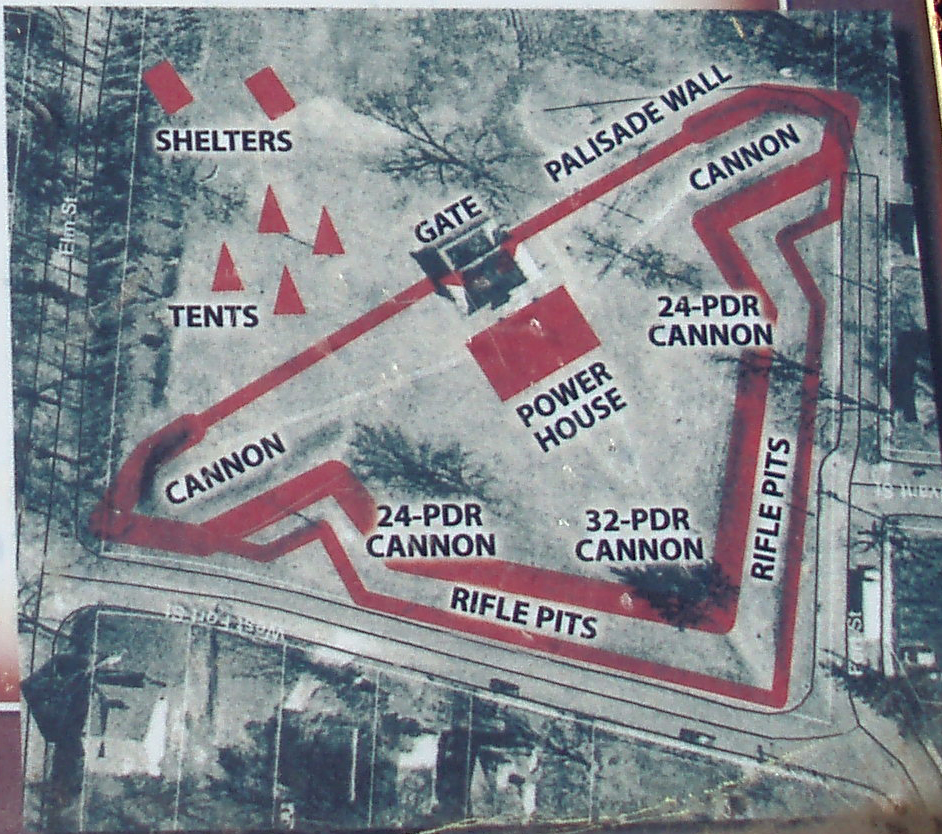
Detail Map of Fort D, Cape Girardeau, Missouri

Work on Fort D began on August 6, 1861, under the direction of Lieutenant John W. Powell of Illinois. Later, Powell recruited a company of men from Cape Girardeau to serve in the Union army. Since Powell was from Illinois, these men were designated as Battery F, 2nd Illinois Light Artillery. After training for several months, the battery was sent up the Tennessee River to Pittsburgh Landing, near a small chapel known as Shiloh. During the Battle of Shiloh, on April 6, 1862, Powell gave a command to fire by raising his hand. A bullet shattered his wrist, and the arm was later amputated to stop infection. In 1869, one-armed John Wesley Powell led the first successful navigation of the Colorado River through what Powell named "the Grand Canyon".

The earthwork walls are the original Fort D, as constructed in 1861 and restored in 1936. A palisade wall, probably made of upright logs, constituted the rear wall and was pierced by a gate. The gap in the south wall may have been a "sally" port, allowing soldiers access to the rifle pits below the parapet. The fort was armed with three 32-pounder cannons and two 24-pounder cannons; all mounted on movable siege carriages. A 32-pounder cannon was a smoothbore cannon that could fire a 32-pound solid round shot over one mile. The cannon plus carriage probably weighed more than four tons.

Fort D was garrisoned by Union troops from Illinois, Missouri, and other Midwestern states throughout the Civil War. The fort was never engaged in real combat; The Battle of Cape Girardeau, April 26, 1863, was fought west of the city.

== Other forts ==
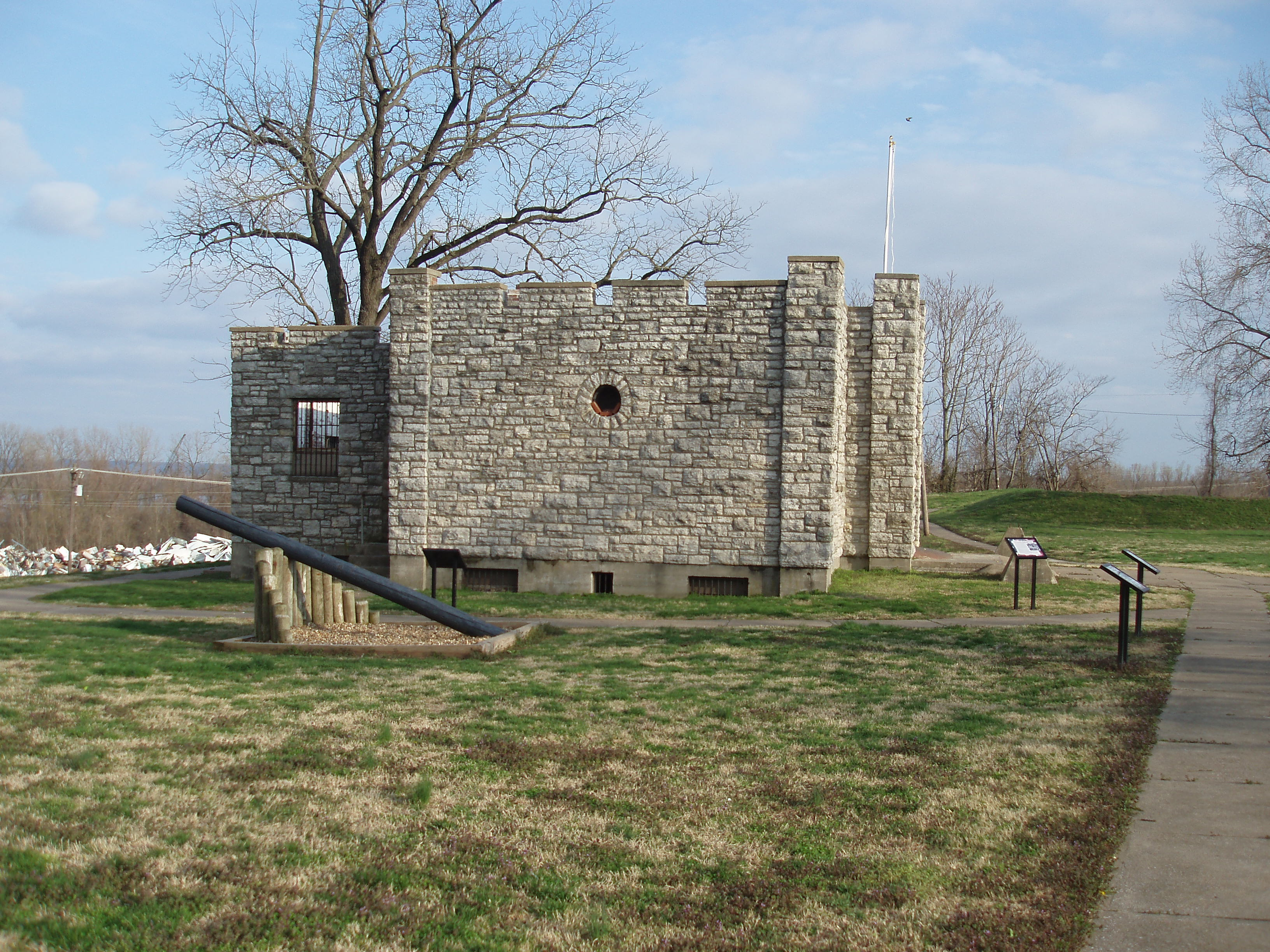
Gunpowder house, Fort D, Cape Girardeau, Missouri

Fort D is the only surviving fortification built by Union troops in the area during the Civil War. Fort A was located slightly north of downtown Cape Girardeau on a high hill. A grist-grinding windmill was included in the fort. Fort B was located where Academic Hall now stands at Southeast Missouri State University. Fort C was built at the end of Bloomfield Road east of Pacific St. Smaller earthworks included Battery A at the corner of Henderson and New Madrid Streets, Battery B on Whitener Street just east of Sunset Avenue and rifle pits along Perry Avenue and on the hill where Southeast Missouri Hospital now stands.

== Modern preservation ==
The fort was saved from development in the early 20th century. The earthworks were repaired by the Works Progress Administration during the 1930s. The stone blockhouse was also built by the WPA in 1936 and has been used for various purposes since. The fort was listed on the National Register of Historic Places in 2019.
