= 21st Texas Cavalry Regiment =

21st Texas Cavalry Regiment First Texas Lancers
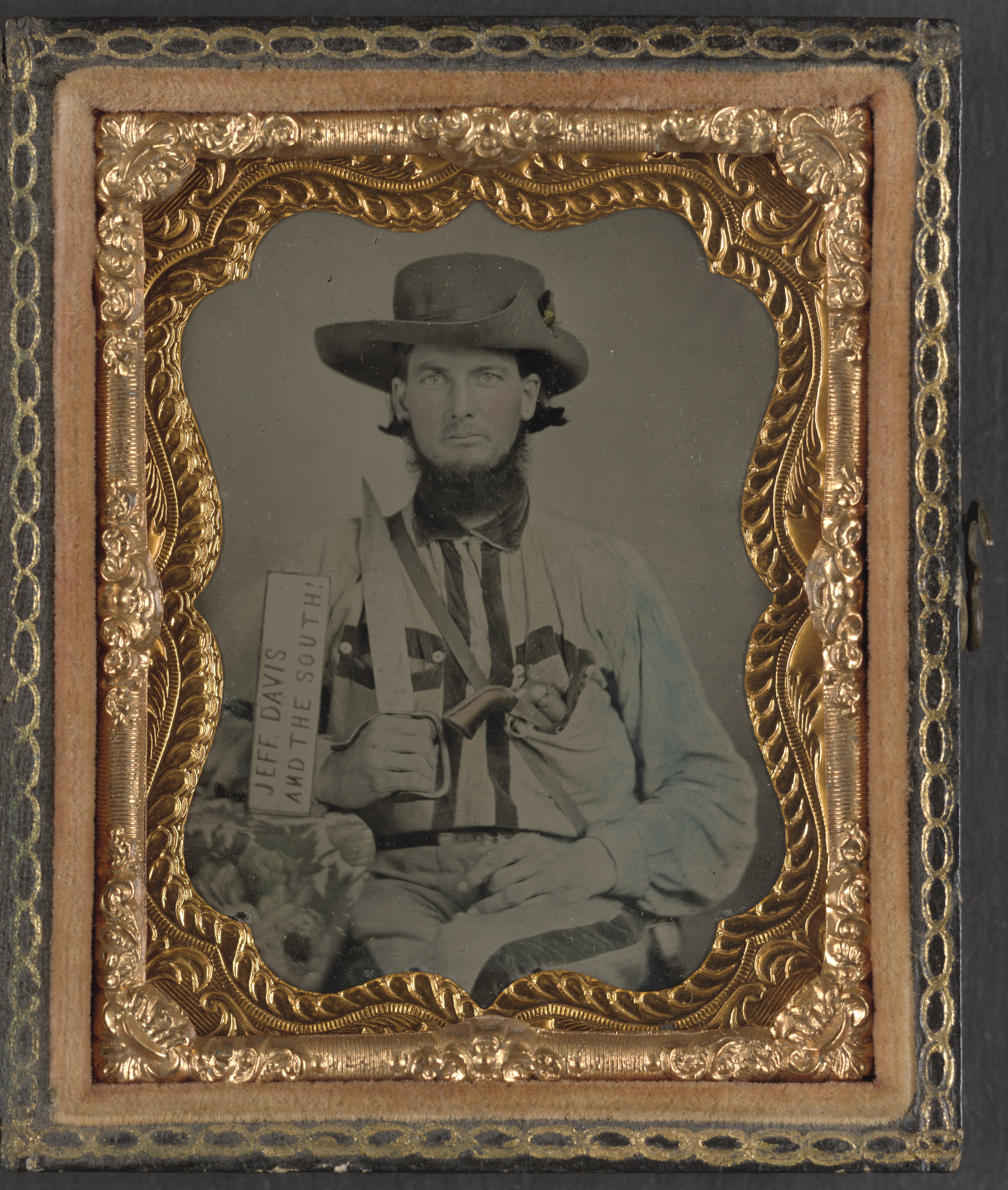
- Unidentified Confederate cavalryman sports a revolver and Bowie knife. The regiment never received lances.
- Active: Spring 1862 – May 1865
- Country: Confederate States of America
- Allegiance: Confederate States of America, Texas
- Branch: Confederate States Army
- Type: Cavalry
- Size: Regiment
- Nickname: 1st Texas Lancers
- Engagements: American Civil War; Battle of Cape Girardeau (1863); Battle of Yellow Bayou (1864)

Commanders
- Notable commanders: George W. Carter

The 21st Texas Cavalry Regiment was a unit of mounted volunteers from Texas that fought in the Confederate States Army during the American Civil War. In spring 1862, George Washington Carter began organizing a lancer cavalry regiment in central Texas. So many men were recruited that two additional lancer regiments, the 24th and 25th Texas Cavalry, were formed. The three units moved to Arkansas where the 24th and 25th were dismounted to serve as infantry, but the 21st remained mounted. Since, the unit never received lances, it served as an ordinary cavalry regiment. The 21st Texas Cavalry fought at Cape Girardeau in 1863. It arrived too late to participate in the key battles of the Red River campaign in 1864, but fought at Yellow Bayou. In 1865, the unit moved to Texas where it disbanded at the end of the war.

== See also ==
- List of Texas Civil War Confederate units
