= Battle of Cape Girardeau =

Battle of the American Civil War

Coordinates: 37.3132°N 89.5514°W

- Part of the Trans-Mississippi Theater of the American Civil War
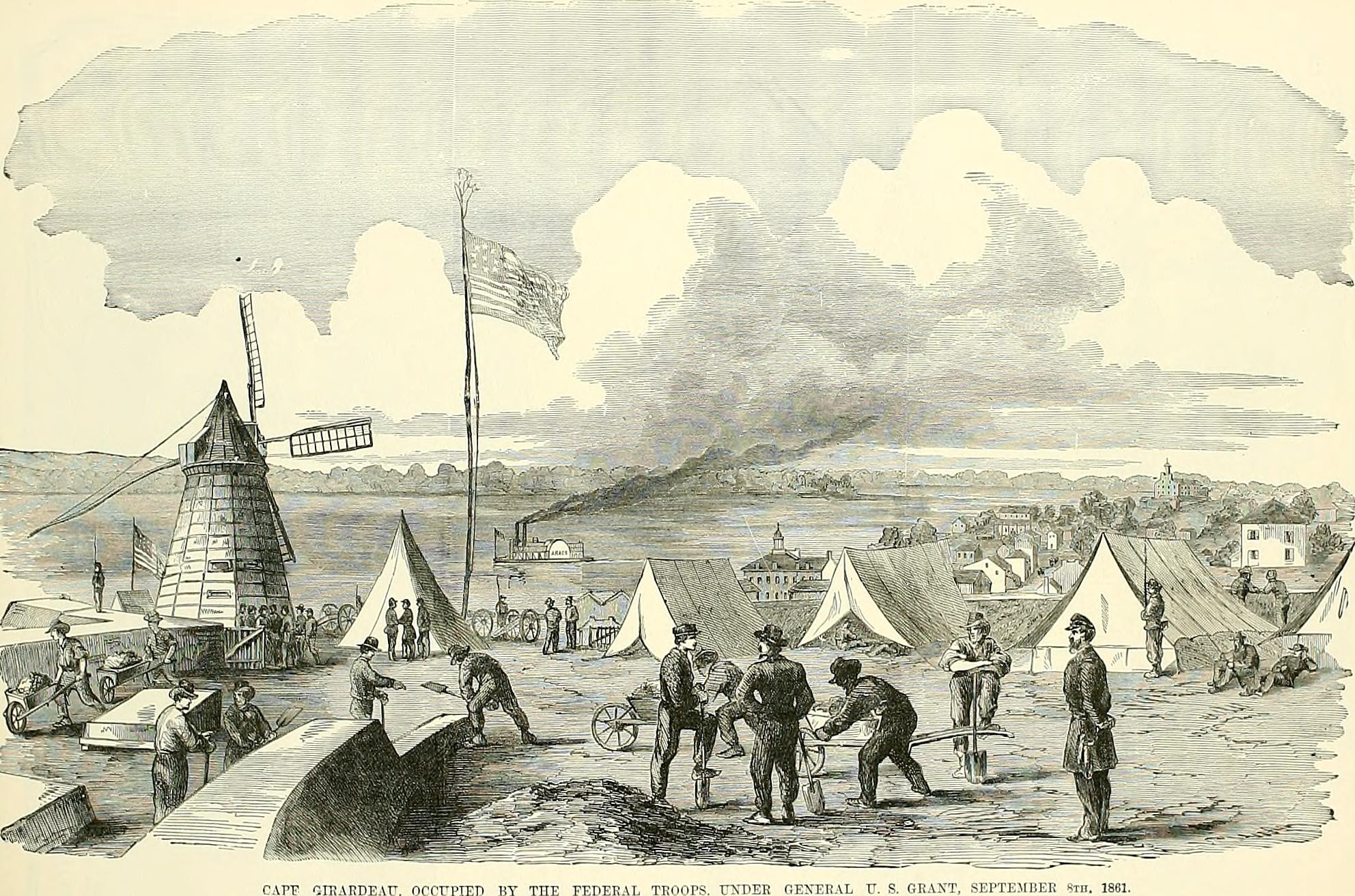
- Cape Girardeau occupied by federal troops
Date	April 26, 1863
Location	Cape Girardeau County, Missouri
Result	Strategic (Union) victory

Belligerents
United States (Union)	(Confederate States of America) CSA (Confederacy)

Commanders and leaders
John McNeil	John S. Marmaduke

Strength
4,000	5,000

Casualties and losses
12	325

The Battle of Cape Girardeau was a military demonstration of the American Civil War, occurring on April 26, 1863 in Cape Girardeau, Missouri. The conflict was part of the pursuit of US Brigadier General John McNeil through Southeast Missouri by Confederate Brigadier General John S. Marmaduke. Though the conflict to this day is known as a battle, it was a relatively small engagement whose primary importance was as the turning point that brought General Marmaduke's second Missouri raid to an end.

== Background ==
General Marmaduke began his second raid into Missouri from Northeast Arkansas on April 18, 1863. During the raid, he intended to obtain much-needed supplies for his troops, several hundred of whom were unarmed and un-mounted. The General feared that if left behind his unarmed troops might desert, but if taken along they may be supplied with arms and horses as captured during the raid.

Marmaduke organized his division of about 5,000 men into two columns, each made up of two brigades. Colonel George W. Carter led one of the columns, which consisted of a brigade led by Colonel Colton Greene and the other by Carter himself. The second column was led by Colonel Joseph O. Shelby and consisted of Shelby's famous "Iron Brigade," commanded by Colonel George W. Thompson, and another brigade commanded by Colonel John Q. Burbridge. In all, the division had between eight and ten pieces of artillery.

General Marmaduke ordered Colonel Carter's column to advance toward Bloomfield, Missouri and attempt to capture the Federal garrison there under the command of US Brigadier General John McNeil. If McNeil had been able to escape, the Confederates thought that he would head north to Pilot Knob, the Union headquarters of the region. Thus Marmaduke accompanied Colonel Shelby's column north to Fredericktown to intercept such an attempt. Shelby's column arrived at Fredericktown on April 22, 1863, but Carter's column did not reach Bloomfield until April 23 because of difficulty crossing the Mingo swamps. Carter arrived at Bloomfield to find that McNeil had left it in ruins two days earlier. Having learned of Marmaduke's position on the road to Pilot Knob, McNeil disobeyed his orders to retreat to Pilot Knob and instead fled northeast to heavily fortified Cape Girardeau, arriving on the evening of April 24.

Carter had been instructed not to pursue McNeil if he fled in any direction other than the road to Fredericktown and Pilot Knob. However, Carter also disobeyed orders and indeed pursued McNeil to within four miles of Cape Girardeau, arriving mid-day on April 25. Carter then sent a letter to McNeil demanding the garrison's surrender and a reply within 30 minutes. The letter was signed by Confederate Major General Sterling Price with the hope that his name would instill fear in McNeil that General Price was nearby. However, McNeil was confident in the strength of his defense and refused to surrender. Fearing an attack, Carter sent word of the situation to General Marmaduke, who then proceeded with Colonel Shelby's column to reinforce Carter's troops in any possible actions at Cape Girardeau.

=== Fortifications ===
In 1861 General Ulysses S. Grant approved the construction of four forts at strategic locations around the city of Cape Girardeau. They were named Forts A, B, C, and D. Fort A was positioned on a bluff overlooking the Mississippi River at the north edge of town and was meant to defend the city against Confederate gunboats on the river. Fort B was located on a hill now occupied by Southeast Missouri State University and was built to protect the city from enemy approaches on the Perryville Road and Jackson Road (now Broadway Avenue). Fort C was near the present intersection of South Ellis Street and Good Hope Street and guarded approaches on the Bloomfield Road, Gordonville Road (now Independence Street), and Commerce Road (now Sprigg Street).

Fort D was located on a river bluff south of the city, and like Fort A, it was primarily a river defense. It was the largest and most important garrison in the region and is the only fort remaining in Cape Girardeau today. However, Fort D did not play an important role in the Battle of Cape Girardeau.

== Action ==
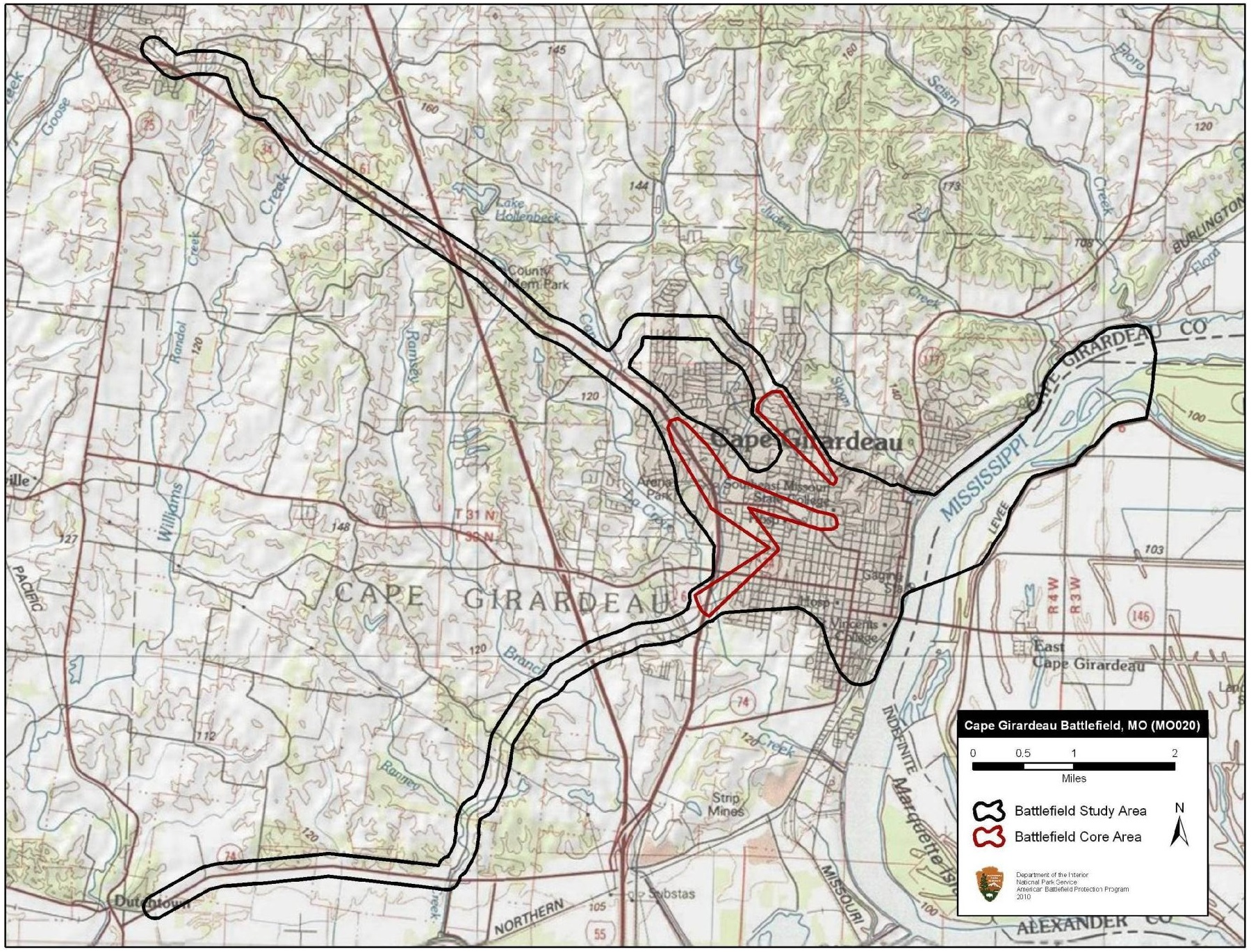
Map of Cape Girardeau Battlefield core and study areas by the American Battlefield Protection Program

On the night of April 25, in anticipation of the attack, General McNeil ordered the evacuation of women and children via steamboat to a safe location upriver. Also during the night two gunboats and a steamer arrived with additional troops to support McNeil's forces. With the gunboats in place McNeil did not foresee any threat from the Mississippi River side of the city, so he had cannons moved from Forts A and D along the river to Forts B and C on the western side of the city. In all, McNeil's forces totaled about 4,000 men, including supporting regiments from Iowa, Wisconsin, Nebraska, and Illinois, though some of these regiments may have arrived after the action had ended.

Shelby's column arrived at Cape Girardeau early on April 26. With General Marmaduke's full division then on the western edge of the city, it assumed a formation that consisted of Colonel Burbridge's brigade in the center, Shelby's on the left, and Carter's on the right. The line extended from just east of St. Mary's Cemetery on the north (near the present intersection of Missouri Ave and Mississippi St) to Gordonville Road on the south. Its center was on the Jackson Road.

The attack began around 10:00 am on April 26. Unsuccessful charges were made by cavalry units from both sides, the Federal troops being driven back by Colonel Shelby's superior cavalry forces and the Confederates being met with heavy fire from field artillery and the guns of Forts B and C. The artillery fire between the forts and Shelby's Brigade made up the bulk of the action. The fighting lasted approximately four to five hours, ceasing sometime after 2:00 pm when General Marmaduke ordered his forces to withdraw.

== Aftermath ==
No reliable reports were made of the numbers killed and wounded during the action, as "official" figures tended to be exaggerated and unfounded. The number of confirmed dead was no more than ten on either side, though some reports claim that the total number killed was close to a hundred, plus over three hundred wounded.

Following the conflict, General Marmaduke retreated to Jackson and then led his troops back to Arkansas, bringing to an end his second Missouri raid. Marmaduke was followed by Federal forces, but no contact was made before crossing the Arkansas border. Possibly as punishment for disobeying orders and instigating the needless conflict at Cape Girardeau, Colonel Carter was demoted to commanding a brigade rather than his entire column.

Though neither side had a clear victory at the closing of the day's fighting, the battle was a strategic Union victory that forced the Confederate forces to retreat to Arkansas.

Historian Henry Phillips concluded, "while it was not of sufficient magnitude to be termed a battle in technical military parlance, all of the potentials were present for a sanguinary battle, and the reason a battle did not occur was because the commanders of the two hostile forces each had reasons that he deemed sufficient for not forcing the issue."

== Forces ==
=== Confederate order of battle ===
Brigadier General John S. Marmaduke (5,086 men, 8 guns)

Confederate order of battle for the Cape Girardeau Raid
Brigade	Unit	Commander
Colonel Joseph O. Shelby	2nd (Jeans') Missouri Cavalry Regiment	Colonel Beal G. Jeans
Colonel Joseph O. Shelby	5th (Gordon's) Missouri Cavalry Regiment	Colonel B. Frank Gordon
Colonel Joseph O. Shelby	6th (Thompson's) Missouri Cavalry Regiment	Colonel Gideon W. Thompson (Note: Oates 1994 (p. 124 & p. 231) named him George W. Thompson.)
Colonel Joseph O. Shelby	10th (Elliott's) Missouri Cavalry Battalion	Major Benjamin Elliott
Colonel Joseph O. Shelby	Shanks' Missouri Cavalry Battalion	Major David Shanks
Colonel Joseph O. Shelby	Joseph Bledsoe's Missouri Battery	Captain Joseph Bledsoe
Colonel Colton Greene	3rd Missouri Cavalry Regiment	Lieutenant Colonel Leonidas C. Campbell
Colonel Colton Greene	8th (Jeffers') Missouri Cavalry Regiment	Colonel William L. Jeffers
Colonel Colton Greene	11th (Young's) Missouri Cavalry Battalion	Colonel Merritt L. Young
Colonel John Q. Burbridge	Burbridge's Missouri Cavalry Regiment	Colonel Burbridge
Colonel John Q. Burbridge	5th Arkansas Cavalry Regiment	Colonel Robert C. Newton
Colonel John Q. Burbridge	Kitchen's Missouri Cavalry Battalion	Lieutenant Colonel Solomon G. Kitchen
Colonel George W. Carter	19th Texas Cavalry Regiment	Colonel Nathaniel M. Burford
Colonel George W. Carter	21st Texas Cavalry Regiment	Lieutenant Colonel D. C. Giddings
Colonel George W. Carter	Reves' Texas Partisan Company	Captain Reves
Colonel George W. Carter	Morgan's Texas Cavalry Squadron	Major Charles L. Morgan
Colonel George W. Carter	10th Texas Field Battery	Captain Benjamin H. Pratt

== Notes ==
Footnotes

Citations
