= Samuel Merrill (Iowa politician) =

American politician (1822–1899)

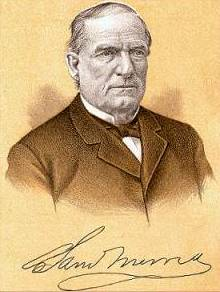

7th Governor of Iowa
- In office January 16, 1868 – January 11, 1872
- Lieutenant: John Scott; Madison M. Walden
- Preceded by: William M. Stone
- Succeeded by: Cyrus C. Carpenter

Member of the Iowa House of Representatives
- In office January 9, 1860 – January 12, 1862

Member of the New Hampshire House of Representatives
- In office 1854–1855

Personal details
- Born: August 7, 1822 Turner, Maine, U.S.
- Died: August 31, 1899 (aged 77) Los Angeles, California, U.S.
- Party: Republican
- Spouse(s): Catherine Thomas (m. 1847; died 1848) Elizabeth Hill (m. 1851; died 1888) Mary S. Fisk (m. 1894)
- Children: 4
- Profession: Army officer

Military service
- Allegiance: United States
- Branch/service: Union Army
- Years of service: August 1, 1861-June 1864
- Rank: Colonel
- Unit: 21st Iowa Volunteer Infantry Regiment
- Battles/wars: American Civil War; Battle of Hartville; Battle of Port Gibson; Vicksburg Campaign; Battle of Big Black River Bridge

Samuel Merrill (August 7, 1822 – August 31, 1899) was the seventh governor of Iowa from 1868–1872, as well as an officer in the Union army during the American Civil War.

== Early life ==
Merrill was born in Turner, Maine and was the second youngest child of Abel Merrill, Jr. and his wife Abigail Merrill (nee Hill). Early in life, he was a committed Whig and churchgoing Protestant, a strong supporter of prohibition and an equally vigorous opponent of the expansion of slavery.

== Career ==
After deciding to become a teacher, he moved to the South, but found himself unpopular due to his strong abolitionist views. He returned to New England, tried farming, and then entered the mercantile business. In 1854 he was elected on the abolitionist ticket to the Legislature of New Hampshire.

In 1856 he decided to leave New England and moved to McGregor, Iowa. He first engaged in the mercantile business (wholesale and retail dry goods) in McGregor. In 1861 he sold his business and organized the McGregor branch of the State Bank.

== Political career ==
Before long, he was elected to the Iowa House of Representatives. In the summer of 1861, Merrill was commissioned Colonel of the 21st Iowa Volunteer Infantry Regiment, serving in that regiment until seriously wounded in the hip at the Battle of Big Black River Bridge on the Big Black River in May 1863. This was part of the Vicksburg Campaign in 1863, where Union forces captured 1,700 retreating Confederate troops. The battle would mean the Confederate troops were bottled up at Vicksburg, Miss., which was strategically vital. General Ulysses S. Grant, who led that campaign, referred to Merrill's intrepidity as "eminently brilliant and daring" and that had Merrill not been a general officer at the time, he would have recommended him for the Medal of Honor. Merrill rejoined his regiment in January 1864, but the lingering effects of his hip wound forced him to terminate his military service the following June.

Merrill returned home to McGregor, Iowa, to recover. He returned to banking in McGregor, and was chosen President of the First National Bank. In 1867 he was elected Governor of Iowa on the Republican ticket. The North Iowa Times newspaper reported, "The people of McGregor were much pleased over the election of Merrill and showed their goodwill by serenading him at his home."

Merrill served as Governor for two terms, from 1868 to 1872. Merrill's impressive record as a demonstrably civic-minded legislator and patriotic army officer gave him significant political capital in postwar Iowa. In 1867 the state's Republican Party nominated him for governor ahead of the outspoken radical Congressman Josiah B. Grinnell (who had not fought for the Union). Merrill easily won the general election on a platform that pledged support for congressional Reconstruction, local economic development, and the enfranchisement of Iowa's small population of African Americans.

He proved to be a capable governor during his two terms in office (1868–1872). He labored hard to boost the state's material prosperity by fostering railroad construction and immigration. He lobbied to protect navigation between the Mississippi and the Great Lakes. He supported the public institutions, such as schools, but also sought to improve business methods to reduce the possibilities of corruption and to promote more efficient delivery of services. He also acknowledged the growth of anti-monopoly concerns among farmer by publicly opposing discriminatory freight rates and passenger fares. In regards to the state penitentiary, he prohibited the practice of flogging and urged that a Sunday school should be located in the same building. Under the administration of Gov. Merrill, the movement for the erection of the new (now current) State House was inaugurated.

In his 1872 farewell address, Governor Merrill said:

While discharging my duty, to be diligent in aiding the development of our State, to labor for the success of our schools and charities...it has been my privilege to realize the intelligence, justice and humanity of our people…[A]s I pass from the one station to the other, permit me to unite with you in dedicating ourselves, our commonwealth, and our country anew to freedom.

== Personal life ==
In 1897 he was injured in a streetcar accident in Los Angeles and never recovered. He died at age 77 and was buried in Des Moines after an imposing funeral ceremony attended by most members of Iowa's political establishment. He was buried with his third wife Elizabeth in a marble tomb in Woodland Cemetery, Des Moines, Iowa. After extensive renovations, a re-dedication of Governor Merrill's mausoleum occurred on Sunday, June 5, 2016.

Samuel Merrill was first married to Catherine Thomas, who died in 1847, fourteen months after their marriage. She died three days after the birth of their infant twins who both died at birth. In January, 1851, he was united in marriage with a Elizabeth Hill, of Buxton, Maine. Elizabeth and Samuel had 2 children, who grew to adulthood. Later, he would marry in California to Mary Susannah Fisk in 1894.

Party political offices
Preceded by William M. Stone	Republican nominee Governor of Iowa; 1867, 1869	Succeeded by Cyrus C. Carpenter
Political offices
Preceded by William M. Stone	Governor of Iowa; January 16, 1868 – January 11, 1872	Succeeded by Cyrus C. Carpenter
