= John McNeil =

Union Army general

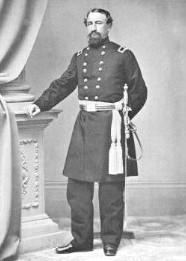
- Brig. Gen. John McNeil
- Born: February 14, 1813; Halifax, Nova Scotia, Canada
- Died: June 8, 1891 (aged 78); St. Louis, Missouri, US
- Burial place: Bellefontaine Cemetery; St. Louis, Missouri
- Military career
- Allegiance: United States of America; Union
- Branch: United States Army; Union Army
- Service years: 1861–1865
- Rank: Brigadier General; Brevet Major General
- Commands: 2nd Missouri Cavalry Regiment
- Conflicts: American Civil War

John McNeil (February 14, 1813 – June 8, 1891) was a general in the Union Army during the American Civil War. He was most noted for his role in the Palmyra massacre and other acts of alleged brutality, as well as his participation in the Battle of Westport, the largest battle west of the Mississippi River. For his role in the Palmyra massacre, he was given the nickname "Butcher of Palmyra".

== Early life and career ==
McNeil was born in Halifax, Nova Scotia, to parents descended from Tories who had fled the American Revolution. He received a common school education and then learned the hatter's trade in Boston, Massachusetts. He engaged unsuccessfully in the business first in New York City and subsequently for twenty years in St. Louis, Missouri. He prospered there, though he lost his fortune to Southern repudiation as the war began. He was a member of the Missouri legislature, 1844–45, and president of the Pacific Insurance Company, 1855–61.

== Civil War ==
When the war began, General Sterling Price of the Missouri Volunteer Militia and pro-secession Governor of Missouri Claiborne Jackson counted on McNeil's support, as he was known as a strong Democrat and closely allied with Southern men. On May 8, 1861, however, McNeil enlisted in the Union volunteers and was immediately made captain of a company. Shortly afterwards, he was promoted to colonel of the 3rd Regiment, U.S. Reserve Corps Infantry.

On May 10, 1861, he commanded some troops at the notorious Camp Jackson Affair at the present day Frost Campus of St. Louis University. The Missouri militia had been called up by the governor for drill. Union supporters feared they might attack the St. Louis Arsenal. Captain Nathaniel Lyon, aware that the governor had secretly had artillery shipped from the Confederacy to the militia, surrounded the State troops and forced their surrender. Subsequently, as the prisoners were being marched downtown a riot began. Union troops - mostly green German volunteers - fired into a crowd. Most of the 28 killed were civilians although some militia and some Union soldiers died too.

On July 17, McNeil with about 600 men defeated the State forces under General David B. Harris at Fulton, Missouri. He was then placed in command of the city of St. Louis by General John C. Frémont. On August 3, McNeil was commissioned colonel of the Nineteenth Missouri Volunteers ("Lyon Regiment") to which he had been named by General Lyon. He resigned in December to accept a colonelcy in the State troops, with the command of a district on the Kansas state line. He spent the winter organizing forces and protecting the Union citizens.

He returned to St. Louis in the spring of 1862 and took over a cavalry regiment, with command of the District of Northeast Missouri, and the special charge of clearing the area of guerrillas—notably, those flocking to Joseph C. Porter. He spent the summer in pursuit of Porter, who had been ordered into the region to recruit troops to be sent into the Confederacy for training, as well as to generally disrupt Union operations. McNeil decisively defeated Porter at the Battle of Kirksville, and was lightly wounded in the action. In the aftermath of the fighting, he ordered the execution of fifteen paroled Confederates, charges which have been derided by some, and an action which would be held against him by others, particularly in light of his actions at Palmyra (see below). He also ordered the execution of Frisby McCullough, an action which was also generally criticized, but which he just as staunchly defended.

=== The Palmyra Massacre ===
His subsequent campaign in Monroe County, Missouri, was also regarded by some as excessively brutal and indiscriminate. He himself said that "where a Union man could not live in peace, a secessionist should not." He concluded his campaign on September 14, taking Palmyra after its abandonment by Porter, and avenging the abduction and presumptive murder of Union loyalist (and alleged informer) Andrew Alsman by executing ten Confederate prisoners in what came to be known as the "Palmyra Massacre." McNeil was criticized even by Union sympathizers for the act, and excoriated in the American and European press. However, Harper's Weekly quoted a defender:

These measures were severe, but not from the character of General McNeil: he will receive the applause of all earnest patriots for treating treason as it deserves. The fruit of his policy is pointedly exhibited where he has ruled. Before his advent murders and all lesser crimes were frequent, for no fault of the sufferers except that they were true to their country and to God. Now no more peaceful, stable, and Union-abiding people are to be found than those who live in Northeast Missouri. Jefferson Davis is thirsting for the blood of the brave General, and his coadjutors in the North are maligning General McNeil, fabricating statements of his brutality, and even asserting the two-fold falsehood that the wife of Allsman petitioned that the rebels might not be executed, and that the old man has since returned. But he will bear such calumnies, and live to reap grateful tributes.

It was true that Confederate President Jefferson Davis had threatened to execute ten Union prisoners unless McNeil was handed over to the Confederacy, but the threat was not carried out. It was also true that a number of local Union-supporters had pleaded with McNeil for the lives of the captives (Allsman's wife not among them). The local loyalist paper however supported McNeil: "The madness of rebellion has become so deep seated that ordinary methods of cure are inadequate." (Palmyra Courier, October 18, 1862) and McNeil himself would respond years later "... cherishing, as I do, the firm conviction that my action was the means of saving lives and property of hundreds of loyal men and women, I feel that my act was the performance of a public duty." (July 1889 response to an article in "The Century" magazine).

In any event, the act earned him the unshakeable title of "Butcher of Palmyra." As a pair, McNeil and his nemesis, Joseph C. Porter, illustrate particularly well the horrors of the war and the difficulty of moral evaluation; it seems likely that the culpability of each was minimized by his own side and exaggerated by the other.

=== Later campaigns ===
McNeil was made brigadier general to rank from November 29, 1862.

In the spring of 1863, McNeil held Cape Girardeau with 4,000 men against Gen. John Sappington Marmaduke's force of 5,000. He commanded the 2nd Brigade of General Alfred Pleasonton's Provisional Cavalry during Price's Raid, and along with Sanborn, led the attack on the second day of the Second Battle of Independence. His troops also participated in the campaign which led to the defeat of Price's army at the Second Battle of Newtonia in October. During the Battle of Westport, McNeil was relieved of command for "cowardice and failure to attack the enemy" by General Alfred Pleasonton. For this and other charges he was court-martialed, but the charges were dismissed. He then commanded the district of Central Missouri until April 12, 1865, when he resigned.

McNeil was given the brevet rank of major general of volunteers in recognition of faithful and meritorious services during the war, to date from the day of his resignation.

== Postwar career ==
Subsequently, McNeil was clerk of the criminal court in St. Louis County, Missouri 1865–67; sheriff of the county, 1866–70, and clerk of the criminal court again, 1875–76. He was in 1876 commissioner to the Centennial Exposition in Philadelphia, was an inspector in the U. S. Indian service in 1878 and 1882, and at the time of his death was superintendent of the United States Post Office, St. Louis branch.

He died in his chair, in his office at St. Louis, and was buried in Bellefontaine Cemetery (Block 35, Lot 1103). His monument carries the verse Soldier, rest; thy warfare o'er, Sleep the sleep that knows not breaking.

== See also ==
- List of American Civil War generals (Union)
