= Palmyra massacre =

1862 American Civil War massacre

Coordinates: 39°47′51″N 91°31′29″W

- Part of the American Civil War
- Location: Palmyra, Missouri
- Date: October 18, 1862
- Attack type: Summary executions
- Weapon: Firearms
- Deaths: 10
- Victim: Confederate prisoners of war
- Perpetrator: (United States) Missouri State Militia
- No. of participants: 30
- Motive: Confederate abduction and presumed murder of Union sympathizer and informant

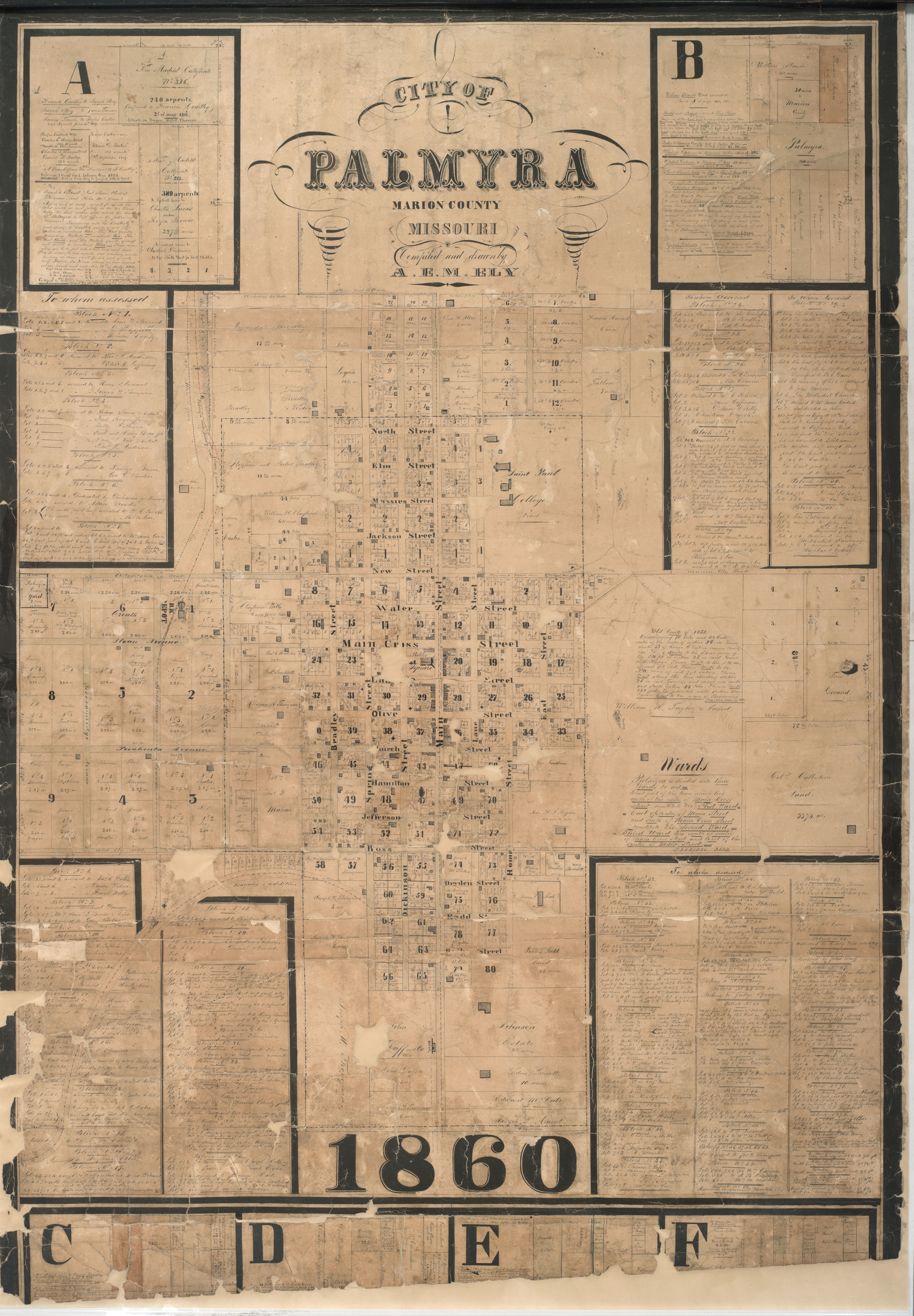
Palmyra, Missouri, as of 1860

The Palmyra massacre is an incident that took place in Palmyra, Missouri, on October 18, 1862, during the American Civil War, when ten Confederate prisoners of war were executed in reprisal for the abduction of a local Union supporter, Andrew Alsman. The officer who ordered the execution, Colonel John McNeil, was later known as the "Butcher of Palmyra". He left the army in 1865, after receiving the customary promotion to brevet rank of Major General of Volunteers in recognition of his faithful service to the Union.

== Disappearance of Alsman ==
Andrew Alsman was a carpenter, sixty years old, and a Union patriot in a largely pro-Confederate area. A Union source describes him as a highly respected and conscientious man who did his duty by leading Union forces to arrest local Confederate sympathizers.

He was taken prisoner by Colonel Porter's forces when Porter raided Palmyra on September 12, 1862. After several skirmishes, Porter decided that Alsman was a liability and set him free. Alsman was hesitant to leave the camp as there were several men who had family members that Alsman had informed on, so Porter allowed him to choose a detail that would see him safely to the city limits of Palmyra or to the nearest Union lines.

Alsman departed camp and was never seen again. Speculation is that he was taken into the woods in northern Marion County or southern Lewis County and shot.

On October 8, Provost Marshal William R. Strachan, a former deputy U. S. Marshal in Missouri, acting for Colonel McNeil, published a notice in the local Union newspaper, the Palmyra Courier (see below) to Confederate Colonel Joseph C. Porter. McNeil threatened that unless Alsman was returned within ten days, ten of Porter's men held as prisoners in Palmyra and Hannibal would be executed.

Porter may never even have seen the notice, and most writers agree that Alsman had already been the victim of personal enemies among Porter's men. The Confederate colonel was therefore powerless to return him. Nevertheless, the presumed murder of Alsman was viewed as part of a pattern of extralegal behavior regarded by Porter's enemies as typical of his command, tolerated if not encouraged by the Rebel leader.

== Victims ==
On the evening of October 17, ten prisoners were selected, five from the jail in Hannibal, Missouri, five from the jail in Palmyra. None of them had any connection with the disappearance of Alsman; Willis Baker was in the Palmyra jail because his sons were said to be riding with Colonel Porter. He was also reported to have killed a Union neighbor in the previous year. All ten were executed on October 18, by a firing squad of thirty soldiers from the Second Missouri State Militia.

== Aftermath ==
After the massacre, it has been claimed that Strachan spared the life of one of the intended victims (William Thomas Humphrey of Lewis County) in exchange for $500 paid by Humphrey's wife. Strachan is also said to have violated the chastity of Mrs. Humphrey, whether as part of the bargain or not. In 1864 Strachan was tried for the rape of Mrs. Humphrey and other offenses, including misuse of funds. Found innocent of rape but guilty of embezzlement, he was sentenced to prison and was released by General William Starke Rosecrans on the grounds of persecution and an unfair trial, even though his accuser was another Union officer.

=== Alsman's skull ===
According to James J. Fisher's column in the Kansas City Star (July 29, 1994) Andrew Alsman was observed alive September 16, 1862, in the company of two Confederate guerrillas, near Troublesome Creek (in the vicinity of Steffenville, MO). In 1877, a farmer walking the creek found and later gave away a skull he thought to be Alsman's. The skull came into the possession of a Newark, MO pharmacist, who put it on display, where it attracted much attention. A man named Edward Wilson purchased it in 1890 and had it placed in a walnut chest lined with velvet. Eventually, he returned the skull to one of Alsman's daughters, living in Palmyra, who supposedly identified it and arranged for burial. Paul Davis, a journalist working for the Hannibal Courier-Post, recalls being shown a box matching this description and containing a skull said to be Alsman's by a Ralls County resident in the 1990s.

The Western Historical Manuscripts Collection at The University of Missouri-Columbia's Ellis Library has an "Account of finding skull believed to be that of Andrew Alsman.

== Legacy ==
The Palmyra Confederate Monument Association erected a granite monument in Palmyra on February 25, 1907. The victims listed were Capt. Thomas A. Siednor, Willis T. Baker, Thomas Humston, Morgan Bixler, John Y. McPheeters, Hiram T. Smith (chosen as a substitute for William Thomas Humphrey), Herbert Hudson, John M. Wade, Francis M. Lear and Eleazer Lake. The monument stands outside the Palmyra courthouse. The actual site of the massacre at the old fairgrounds is currently a farm field just east of Palmyra.

The Marion County Jail and Jailor's House was added to the National Register of Historic Places in 2002.
