= Battle of Hartville =

Battle of the American Civil War

Coordinates: 37.2511°N 92.5111°W

- Part of the Trans-Mississippi Theater of the American Civil War
| Date | January 9, 1863 – January 11, 1863 |
| Location | Wright County, Missouri |
| Result | Confederate victory: Confederates are victorious, but unable to continue raid |

Belligerents
| United States (Union) | (Confederate States of America) CSA (Confederacy) |

Commanders and leaders
| Samuel Merrill | John S. Marmaduke |

Units involved
| Southwestern District of Missouri Troops | 4th Division, I Corps, Trans-Mississippi Department |

Strength
| ~750 | |

Casualties and losses
| 78 total 7 killed 64 wounded 7 missing or captured | 111 total 12 killed 96 wounded 3 missing or captured |

The Battle of Hartville was fought January 11, 1863, in Wright County, Missouri, as part of John S. Marmaduke's first expedition into Missouri, during the American Civil War.

== Background ==
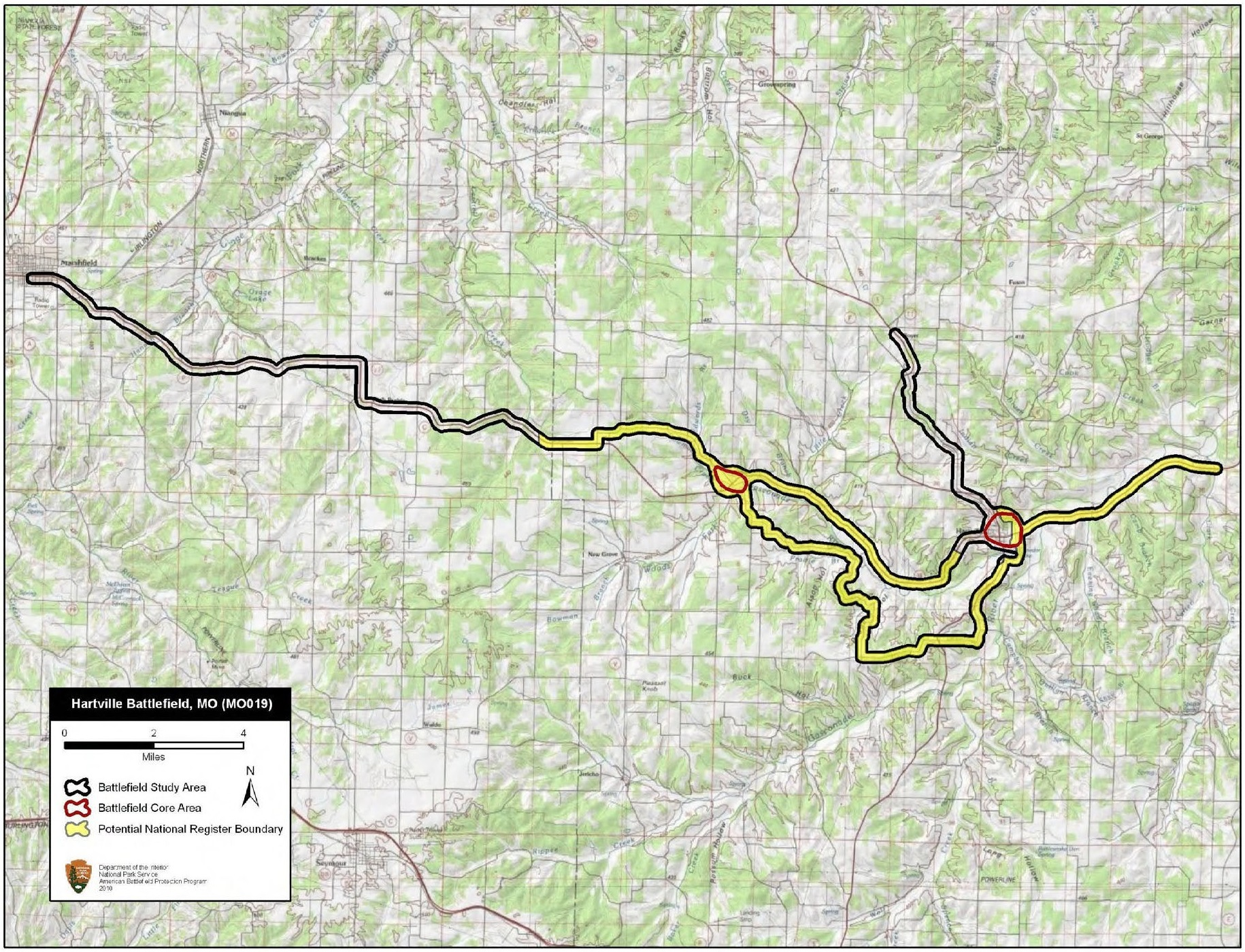
Map of Hartville Battlefield core and study areas by the American Battlefield Protection Program.

Marmaduke led a Confederate raid into Missouri in early January 1863. This movement was two-pronged. Col. Joseph C. Porter led one column, comprising his Missouri Cavalry Brigade, out of Pocahontas, Arkansas, to assault Union posts around Hartville, Missouri. When he neared Hartville on January 9, he sent a detachment forward to reconnoiter. It succeeded in capturing the small militia garrison. The same day, Porter moved toward Marshfield. On January 10, some of Porter's men raided other Union installations in the area before making contact with Marmaduke's column east of Marshfield. Marmaduke had received reports of Union troops approaching to surround him and prepared for a confrontation.

On January 10, Col. Samuel Merrill commanded an approaching Union relief column from Houston, Missouri. He and his command arrived in Hartville that morning, discovered that the small garrison had already surrendered, and set out toward Springfield. His force went into camp on Wood's Fork of the Gasconade River. Early on the morning of January 11 the approaching Confederates under Porter made contact with Merrill's scouts and skirmishing commenced.

== Opposing forces ==
=== Union ===
Colonel Samuel Merrill

- 99th Illinois Infantry - Lt. Col. Lemuel Parke
- 21st Iowa Infantry - Lt. Col. C.W. Dunlap (w)
- 3rd Iowa Cavalry (detachment)- Maj. George Duffield
- 3rd Missouri Cavalry (detachment) - Capt. Thomas G. Black
- 2nd Missouri Artillery, Battery L (section) - Lt. William Waldschmidt

=== Confederate ===
Brig. Gen. John S. Marmaduke

Shelby's Brigade - Col. J.O. Shelby

- 1st Missouri Cavalry - Lt. Col. B.F. Gordon - Maj. George R. Kirtley (k)
- 2nd Missouri Cavalry - Lt. Col. C.A. Gilkey
- 3rd Missouri Cavalry - Col. G.W. Thompson
- 1st Battn. Missouri Cavalry - Maj. Ben Elliott
- Quantrill's Partisan Rangers - Lt. William H. Gregg

Porter's Brigade - Col. Joseph C. Porter (mw)

- Burbridges' Regt. - Lt. Col. John M. Wimer (k)
- Green's Regt. - Lt. Col. L.C. Campbell
- Jeffers' Regt. - Col. William M. Jeffers

Not Brigaded

- MacDonald's Missouri Regt. - Col. Emmett MacDonald (k)

Artillery

- Capt. Brown's Arkansas Battery - Capt. Louis T. Brown
- Lt. Collins' Section of Bledsoe's Battery (later Collins' Battery) - Lt. Richard A. Collins

Based on Frederick Goman's order of battle, except where noted.

== Battle ==
Marmaduke believed he was being pressed by several forces, so he diverted Porter and Shelby's columns along another road to Hartville. Meanwhile, observing this movement, Merrill marched his force directly to Hartville where it took a strong defensive position on covered, high ground west of the courthouse. Merrill's battle line extended 650 yards with no reserve. Shelby and Porter's brigades attempted to dislodge Merrill's force, but it was too strongly positioned. A mistaken observation probably by Lt. Dick Collins on the bluff east of town reported a wagon train moving toward the Lebanon Road. Porter placed his men in a column to pursue the supposedly retreating enemy.

Coming under fire from the 3rd Missouri and the 3rd Iowa who were hidden on the far left side of the Union line with Sharps Carbines firing four to five shots per minute. That advance became disordered and the battle move eastward as Shelby's men came forward to support Porter's beleaguered men. Over a four-hour period several Confederate assaults were made, each being repulsed in turn. Eventually Merrill withdrew most of his force, although a third of the men under Lt. Col Dunlap never received the order and remained on the field until nightfall.

== Aftermath ==
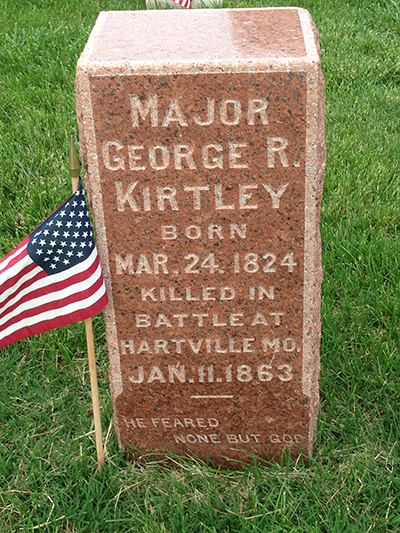
Major George R Kirtley Grave Marker in the Springfield National Cemetery

Elements of both sides observed the other withdrawing from the field as night approached, and both claimed victory as a result. The real results were mixed. From the Union command's perspective they had repulsed Marmaduke's assaults inflicting heavy casualties, but the Federals had been forced to leave the field. From the Confederate perspective Marmaduke had united his force and secured his line of withdrawal. He set up a field hospital in town and could claim to control the field briefly. However, he was compelled to make a rapid retreat into Arkansas and then an arduous trek to winter camp. Additionally, the frontal assaults had resulted in the death or mortal wounding of several senior CSA officers including: brigade commander Col. Joseph C. Porter, Col. Emmett MacDonald, Lt. Col. John Wimer, and Major George R. Kirtley.

The raid itself caused great disruption of Federal forces in the region and a number of small outposts had been overrun, destroyed, or abandoned. However, the other major objective, the depot at Springfield, remained in Union hands. The successful escape of the raiding party did foreshadow the vulnerability of Federal Missouri to fast-moving expeditions.
