= Joseph C. Porter =

Confederate Army officer (1819–1863)

- Born: September 12, 1809; Jessamine County, Kentucky
- Died: February 18, 1863 (aged 53); Batesville, Arkansas
- Military career
- Allegiance: Confederate States of America; Missouri
- Branch: Missouri State Guard; Confederate States Army
- Rank: Colonel
- Commands: 1st Northeast Missouri Cavalry; Porter's Brigade
- Conflicts: American Civil War

Joseph Chrisman Porter (12 September 1809 – 18 February 1863) was a Confederate officer in the American Civil War, a key leader in the guerrilla campaigns in northern Missouri, and a figure of controversy. The main source for his history, Joseph A. Mudd (see below) is clearly an apologist; his opponents take a less charitable view of him, and his chief adversary, Union Colonel John McNeil, regarded him simply as a bushwacker and traitor, though his service under General John S. Marmaduke in the Springfield campaign ("Marmaduke's First Raid") and following clearly shows he was regarded as a regular officer by the Confederacy.

== Early life ==
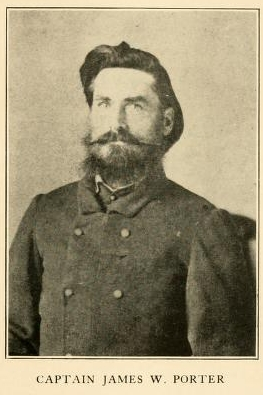
James, the brother of Joseph Porter

Joseph C. Porter was born in Jessamine County, Kentucky, to James and Rebecca Chrisman Porter. The family moved to Marion County, Missouri, in 1828 or 1829, where Porter attended Marion College in Philadelphia, Missouri, and was a member of the Presbyterian Church. About 1844, Porter married Mary Ann E. Marshall (d. DeWitt, AR "about two years after the war closed," according to Porter's sister). They subsequently moved to Knox County, remaining there until 1857, when they moved to Lewis County, and settled five miles east of Newark. Family members assert that only one photograph of Porter was known to exist, and it was destroyed when his home was burned by Union soldiers.

Porter had strong Southern sympathies, and was subject to harassment by pro-Union neighbors, since he lived in an area where loyalties were sharply divided. His brother, James William Porter (b. 1827, m. Carolina Marshall, sister to Joseph's wife Mary Ann, 1853), was also a Confederate officer and Joseph's trusted subordinate, reaching the rank of major. The brothers went to California during the Gold Rush of 1849, then returned to Missouri and farmed together before the war.

== Civil War ==
The Porter brothers enrolled with Colonel Martin E. Green's Missouri State Guard regiment and participated in the attack on the union Home Guard at Athens; and they later participated in the Confederate attack on Lexington, September 1861. Joseph Porter had no prior military experience, but proved to be a natural leader and was elected a lieutenant colonel (an official commission would come later) in the Missouri State Guard.

Following his participation in the Battle of Pea Ridge in March 1862, Porter returned home on the orders of General Sterling Price, to raise recruits throughout northeast Missouri. His duties included the establishment of supply drops, weapons caches and a network of pro-Southern informants. As a Colonel he commanded the 1st Northeast Missouri Cavalry.

Throughout Porter's brief military career, his status as a regular army officer was not fully recognized by his adversaries, particularly Colonel John McNeil. Those serving behind Union lines were not recognized as legal combatants and were threatened with execution if captured.

Though most of his activities were guerrilla operations or harassment, a few battles were fought. On June 17, 1862, near Warren or New Market, in Warren Township, Marion County with 43 mounted men, he captured four men of the Union regiment he found there. The prisoners' weapons and horses were taken, then they were paroled on their oath not to take up arms against the Confederacy until exchanged.

=== Cherry Grove ===
Moving northward through the western part of Marion, the eastern portion of Knox, and the western border of Lewis counties, Porter approached Sulphur Springs, near Colony, in Knox County. Along his route he collected perhaps 200 recruits. From Sulphur Springs he moved north, threatened the Union Home Guards at Memphis, picked up additional recruits in Scotland County, and moved westward into Schuyler County to get a company known to be there under Captain Bill Dunn. Union forces under Colonel Henry S. Lipscomb and others responded with a march on Colony. They overtook Porter at Cherry Grove, in the northeastern part of Schuyler County, near the Iowa line, where, with a superior force, they attacked and defeated him, routing his forces and driving them southward. Losses on both sides were minor. Porter retreated rapidly, pursued by Lipscomb, until his forces dispersed at a point about 10 miles west of Newark. Porter, with perhaps 75 men, remained in the vicinity of his home for some days, gathering recruits all the time, and getting ready to strike again.

=== Memphis ===
On Sunday, July 13, Porter approached Memphis, Missouri in four converging columns totalling 125–169 men and captured it with little or no resistance. They first raided the Federal armory, seizing about a hundred muskets with cartridge boxes and ammunition, and several uniforms (Mudd, see below, was among those who would wear the Union uniform, as he claimed, for its superior comfort in the heat, a fact which would later draw friendly fire and aggravate the view of Porter's troops as bushwhackers, neither obeying nor protected by the rules of war). They rounded up all adult males, who were taken to the court house to swear not to divulge any information about the raiders for forty-eight hours. Porter freed all militiamen or suspected militiamen to await parole, a fact noted by champions of his character. Citizens expressed their sympathies variously; Porter gave safe passage to a physician, an admitted supporter of the Union, who was anxious to return to his seriously ill wife. A verbally abusive woman was threatened with a pistol by one of Porter's troops, perhaps as a bluff; Mudd intervened to prevent bloodshed. Porter's troops entered the courthouse and destroyed all indictments for horse-theft; the act is variously understood as simple lawlessness, intervention on behalf of criminal associates, or interference with politically motivated, fraudulent charges.

At Memphis, a key incident occurred which would darken Porter's reputation, and which his detractors see as part of a consistent behavioral pattern which put him and his men beyond the norms of warfare. According to the "History of Shelby County," which is generally sympathetic to Porter, "Most conceded that Col. Porter's purpose for capturing Memphis, MO. was to seize Dr. Wm. Aylward, a prominent Union man of the community." Aylward was captured during the day by Captain Tom Stacy's men and confined to a house. After rousing him overnight and removing him, ostensibly to see Porter, guards claimed that he escaped. However, witnesses reported hearing the sounds of a strangling, and his body was found the next day, with marks consistent with hanging or strangulation.

At Memphis, Porter had been joined by Tom Stacy, generally regarded as a genuine bushwhacker – even the sympathetic Mudd says of him "if one of his men were captured and killed he murdered the man who did it if he could catch him, or, failing him, the nearest man he could catch to the one who did it." Stacy's company was called "the chain gang" by the other members of Porter's command. Supporters of Porter attribute the murder of Aylward to Stacy (who would be mortally wounded at Vassar Hill.) However, a Union gentleman who came to inquire about Aylward and a captured officer before the discovery of the body stated that when he asked Porter about Aylward, the response was, "He is where he will never disturb anybody else."

=== Vassar Hill ===
Union Col. (later General) John McNeil pursued Porter, who planned an ambush with perhaps 125 men according to participant Mudd (though Federal estimates of Porter's strength ran from 400 to 600 men). The battle is called "Vassar Hill" in the History of Scotland County; Porter himself called it "Oak Ridge," and Federal forces called it "Pierce's Mill," after a location 1.5 miles northwest of the battlefield. A detachment of three companies (C, H, I), about 300 men of Merrill's Horse, under Major John Y. Clopper, was dispatched by McNeil from Newark against Porter, and attacked him at 2 p.m. on Friday, July 18, on the south fork of the Middle Fabius River, ten miles southwest of Memphis. Porter's men were concealed in brush and stayed low when the Federals stopped to fire prior to each charge. Porter's men held their fire until the range was very short, increasing the lethality of the volley. Clopper was in the Federal front, and out of 21 men of his advance guard, all but one were killed and wounded. The Federals made at least seven mounted charges according to Mudd, doing little but adding to the body count. A battalion of roughly 100 men of the 11th Missouri State Militia Cavalry under Major Rogers arrived and dismounted. While Clopper claimed to have driven the enemy from the field after this, Mudd indicates that the Federals instead fell back and ended the engagement leaving Porter in possession of the field until he withdrew. Clopper's reputation suffered as a result of his poor tactics. Before the final charge one company officer angrily asked, "Why don't you dismount those men and stop murdering them?"

On page 86 of "With Porter in North Missouri", Mudd describes "One of our boys, down the line out of my sight, losing his head fired too soon and when the Federal was about to ride him down, had an empty gun in his hand. This he clubbed and striking his assailant a powerful blow on the neck, killed him." In Joseph Budd's pension records, his death is described as occurring due to "a stroke of a weapon breaking his neck". Joseph is pictured on the right.

Union casualties were about 24 killed and mortally wounded (10 from Merrill's Horse and 14 from the 11th MSM Cavalry), and perhaps 59 wounded (24 from Merrill's Horse, and 35 from the 11th MSM Cavalry.) Porter's loss was as little as three killed and five wounded according to Mudd, or six killed, three mortally wounded, and 10 wounded left on the field according to the Shelby County History. The Union dead were originally buried on the Jacob Maggard farm, which served as a temporary hospital.

After the fight, Porter moved westward a few miles, then south through Paulville, in the eastern part of Adair County; thence south-east into Knox County, passing through Novelty, four miles east of Locust Hill, at noon on Saturday, July 19, having fought a battle and made a march of sixty-five miles in less than twenty-four hours.

=== Florida ===
July 22: Detachments of F & G Companies (60 men total) of 3rd Iowa Volunteer Cavalry under Major Henry Clay Caldwell encountered Porter with 300 rebels at Florida in Monroe County, Missouri. The detachment fought outnumbered for one hour and fell back upon the post of Paris, Missouri, with 22 wounded and 2 captured.

=== Santa Fe ===
July 24: Major Caldwell and 100 men of his 3rd Iowa Volunteer Cavalry pursued Porter and his 400 men into dense brush near Botts' farm, near Santa Fe, Missouri. Porter fled and was pursued into Callaway County, Missouri. The Second Battalion suffered one killed and ten wounded.

=== Moore's Mill ===
July 28: Union forces under Colonel (later General ) Odon Guitar engaged Porter near Moore's Mill (now the village of Calwood) in Callaway County. The Union losses were 19 killed, 21 wounded. Guerrilla losses were 36-60 killed, 100 wounded. This was one of Porter's most aggressive actions, involving a daring charge and disabling the Federal artillery, until forced to retreat by the arrival of Union reinforcements and the exhaustion of his ammunition.

=== Newark ===
August 1: McNeil had dispatched Lair to Newark. Porter headed westward from Midway, putting his brother Jim Porter in charge of one column, himself at the head of another, approaching the town from east and south simultaneously, and closing the trap on the completely surprised federals at 5 p.m. on July 31.

Porter forced a company of 75 Federals to take refuge in a brick schoolhouse; when they refused terms, he had a loaded haywagon fired and threatened to run it into the building. The Federals surrendered, were paroled and permitted to keep their sidearms.

The Federal loss in the Newark fight was 4 killed, 6 wounded, and 72 prisoners. The Confederate loss was reported at from 10 to 20 killed, and 30 severely wounded. Union soldiers were treated well, but the Union-sympathizing storekeepers had their businesses gutted, and citizens were subjected to abuse. Some claim this was in spite of Porter's orders, and claimed that he bore his old neighbors no malice, while others view this action as Porter's revenge for previous ill-treatment.

Despite the victory at Newark, the high casualties on the winning side, attributed to chaotic advance and undisciplined exposure of Porter's troops to hostile fire, suggest growing disorder in his ranks. From here, records of his activities—and even the degree to which he can be said to have a unified command—are unclear. Various forces with varying degrees of official relation to Porter's command are credited with capturing Paris and Canton, and with bringing in new supplies and recruits. Porter's numbers had swelled to a size likely to be unmanageable, particularly considering the lack of trained officers and that not more than a quarter of his 2000 or so troops had regulation equipment. Perhaps another quarter had squirrel-guns or shotguns, while the rest no arms at all. Porter's objective was now to get south to Arkansas with his recruits, in order that they might be properly trained and equipped.

=== Kirksville ===
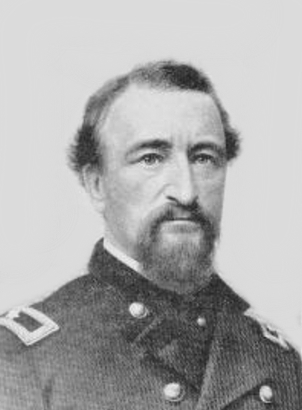
Union Colonel John McNeil, who defeated Porter at the Battle of Kirksville.

August 6, 1862

At Kirksville, Porter made a serious mistake in engaging Union forces under Col. John McNeil, whom he knew to have cannon – perhaps in overconfidence, as a result of his sharpshooters' ability to pick off the Federal artillerymen at Santa Fe. Traveling light had been Porter's great advantage -- "His troops lived off the country, and every man was his own quartermaster and commissary," in contrast to the elaborate baggage and supply trains of McNeil ("History of Shelby County"). Here Porter suffered unequivocal defeat, from which he would not recover.

=== Dispersal of forces ===
At Clem's Mills, five miles west of Kirksville, Porter crossed the Chariton River, seeking to link up with Col. John A. Poindexter in Chariton County, known to have 1,200 or 1,500 recruits; their combined forces would be able to force a passage of the Missouri River at Glasgow or Brunswick, and open a line to the Confederacy. Three miles north of Stockton (now New Cambria), in western Macon County, Porter encountered 250 men of the First Missouri State Militia, under Lieut. Col. Alexander Woolfolk, coming up to unite with McNeil. There was a brief fight at Panther Creek, Friday, August 8. Porter was turned from his course and retreated toward the northeast, away from his intended line of march and ultimate goal. The next day, Col. James McFerran, of the First Missouri State Militia, joined Woolfolk with 250 more men and took command. He caught up with Porter at Walnut Creek, in Adair County and drove him eastward to the Chariton. At See's Ford, where he recrossed the Chariton, Porter set up an ambush on the east bank with 125 men. Porter's forces opened fire at short range. Only two Federals were killed outright and 15 wounded, but the action seemed to have caused McFerran to break off pursuit.

Porter passed on to Wilsonville, in the south-east part of Adair. Here, a mass desertion took place among his discouraged troops; in a few hours, 500 had drifted away.

=== Capture of Palmyra and the Allsman incident ===
Porter wandered around the wilderness, his desertion-diminished troops feeding off the land, although there were some new recruits as well. On Friday, September 12, Porter, with 400 men, captured Palmyra, with 20 of its garrison, and held the place two hours, losing one man killed and one wounded. One Union citizen was killed and three Federals wounded. Porter's objectives were to liberate Confederates held in the jail there, and to draw Federal forces away from the Missouri River, so as to open it to southward crossing by rebels seeking to join Confederate units.

The Confederates carried away an elderly Union citizen named Andrew Allsman. The fate of Allsman remains something of a mystery, and there is disagreement as well about his character and his legitimacy as a target (see Palmyra Massacre).

Porter quickly abandoned Palmyra to McNeil, and another period of wandering ensued, in the general direction of his own home near Newark. There were further desertions, and a number of bands of organized rebels refused to place themselves under Porter's command, clearly indicating that he had lost public confidence. At Whaley's Mill, his men were definitively scattered, almost without a fight.

=== Death ===
After his rout by McNeil at Whaley's Mill, and the dispersion of his troops at Bragg's school house, Col. Porter kept himself hidden for a few days. He abandoned the idea of raising a militarily significant force, and entered Shelby County on a line of march to the south with fewer than 100 men remaining. He made his way safely through Monroe, Audrain, Callaway and Boone counties, and crossed the Missouri River in a skiff, continuing into Arkansas. Here he organized, from the men who had accompanied him and others whom he found in Arkansas, a regiment of Missouri Confederate cavalry. From Pocahontas, Arkansas, in the latter part of December 1862, as acting brigadier, he moved with his command and the battalions of Cols. Colton Greene and J. Q. A. Burbridge, to cooperate with Gen. John S. Marmaduke in his attack on Springfield. Through a mistake of Gen. Marmaduke, Col. Porter's command did not participate in this attack. It moved on a line far to the east. After the expedition had failed, the commands of Marmaduke and Porter united east of Marshfield, and started to retreat into Arkansas.

At the Battle of Hartville, in Wright Country on January 11, 1863, a small Federal force was encountered and defeated, although at severe loss to the Confederates, who had many valuable officers killed and mortally wounded. Among the latter was Colonel Porter, commanding a brigade, shot from his horse with wounds to the leg from an artillery shell. In Oates's account (118–119), Porter died an hour later. According to Mudd, however, Porter was shot from his horse with wounds to the leg and the hand while leading a charge; in this account, Porter managed to accompany the army on a difficult trek into Arkansas, arriving at Camp Sallado on January 20, and at Batesville January 25, where he died from his wounds on February 18, 1863. The early date is refuted by Porter's own report, dated February 3, referencing the journey after the battle, as well as eyewitness Major G.W.C. Bennett's reference to "Porter's column" on the march several days after and dozens of miles away from the battle, and finally by Marmaduke's noting Porter among the wounded, in contrast to the listing of officers killed; additional near-contemporary sources also affirm Porter's survival of the journey to Arkansas. The January 11 date seems to originate with General Fitz Henry Warren, who reported as fact the speculation that a burial observed by a recently paroled Lieutenant Brown was that of Porter.

The location of Col. Porter's grave remains unknown. Oral traditions suggest that he was at some point buried on the farm of his cousin Ezekiel Porter (said to be a volunteer ambulance driver during the war), just north of Hartville, in what is now known as Porter's Cemetery, near Competition, Missouri.

== Legacy and evaluation ==
Porter is credited variously with five and nine children, only two of whom were living at the time of Mudd's book, his daughter, Mrs. O.M. White, and his son, Joseph I. Porter of Stuttgart, AR, who wrote: "I know but little about the war and have been trying to forget what I do know about it. I hope never to read a history of it."

Porter's daughter O. M. White wrote that the family did not have a picture of their father, "the only one we ever had was destroyed when our home was burned by the soldiers during the war."

Porter's character is hard to estimate: clearly he possessed considerable personal courage, but was also a prudent tactician, often declining battle when he could not choose his ground and when he thought the potential for casualties disproportionate to projected gains. Declining the option to pursue the retreating Union force at Santa Fe, Mudd has him say "I can't see that anything would be accomplished by pursuing the enemy. We might give them a drive and kill a dozen of them and we might lose a man or two, and I wouldn't give them one of my men for a dozen dead federals unless to gain some particular purpose."

A number of atrocities are attributed to him, but the partisanship of accounts makes it difficult to ascertain his responsibility for the killings of Dr. Aylward, Andrew Allsman, James Dye at Kirksville, a wounded Federal at Botts' Farm, and others, though it must be concluded that he failed to communicate the unacceptability of such actions to his subordinates. There is reliable eyewitness testimony to his intervening to prevent the lynching of two captured Federals in retaliation for the execution of a Confederate prisoner at the Battle of Florida.
