= 46th Arkansas Infantry (Mounted) =

- Active: 1864–1865
- Country: Confederate States
- Allegiance: Arkansas
- Branch: Army
- Type: Infantry
- Size: Regiment
- Facings: Light blue
- Engagements: American Civil War: Price's Missouri Raid; Battle of Fort Davidson; Fourth Battle of Boonville; Battle of Glasgow, Missouri; Battle of Sedalia; Second Battle of Lexington; Battle of Little Blue River; Second Battle of Independence; Battle of Byram's Ford; Battle of Westport; Battle of Marais des Cygnes; Battle of Mine Creek; Battle of Marmiton River; Second Battle of Newtonia

The 46th Arkansas Infantry (Mounted) (1864–1865) was a Confederate Army Mounted Infantry regiment during the American Civil War. While authorized by the State Military Board as an infantry regiment, the unit was mounted for Price's Missouri Expedition and served as mounted infantry. Due to its mounted status, the unit is sometimes referred to as the 46th Arkansas Cavalry when a numerical designation is used. The unit is almost always referred to as either Coleman's Arkansas Cavalry Regiment or Crabtree's Cavalry in official reports from the period.

== Organization ==
In 1862, Colonel William O. Coleman returned to Carter County, Missouri and recruited heavily among former Missouri State Guard soldiers to form Coleman's Missouri Cavalry Regiment. Many of the same men appear on the rosters (compiled from individual service records) of Coleman's Missouri Cavalry regiment as the roster of the 4th Missouri Cavalry. Several of these men were from Arkansas, including Captain Wiley C Jones, who was the commander of a company in Coleman's 4th Missouri Cavalry. Apparently, Coleman's Missouri Cavalry Regiment operated for some time without formal recognition, until the summer of 1864, and it was granted in July 1864 official status as a Partisan Ranger Regiment (Independent Cavalry Command) under the Partisan Ranger Act of 1862. It was only an officially independent command for a few months, before the reorganization of commands for Price's Raid in Missouri which occurred between August and October 1864. At some point several of the previously independent cavalry regiments, battalions, and companies were organized into new commands.

In May 1864, General J. O. Shelby occupied Northeast Arkansas, well behind Union army lines. In early June 1864, General Shelby commissioned Colonel Thomas Hamilton McCray, among others to begin raising regiments in Northeast Arkansas. By June 13, Shelby reported to General Sterling Price that McCray's efforts were bearing fruit.

The work of recruiting goes bravely on. Colonel McCray will have a brigade and Dobbin, Coffee, Freeman and Coleman will have regiments.

Colonel McCray's efforts led to the recruitment of at least three regiments, the 45th, 46th and 47th Arkansas Infantry Regiments. These 40-series regiments consisted mostly of conscripts, and absentees from existing units, organized around a small cadre of detailed from infantry regiments, which were expected to be idle during the fall and winter of 1864.

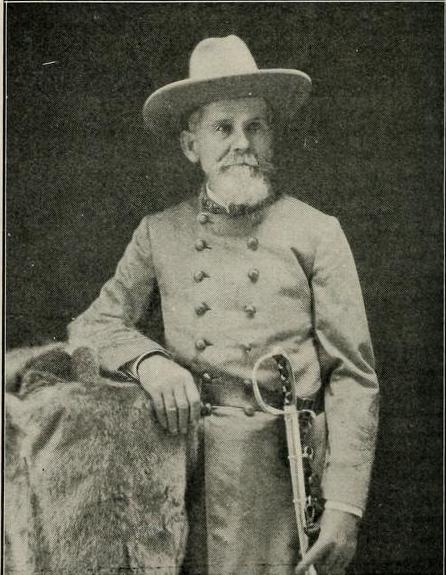
Post War Photo of Colonel William O. Coleman.

The decreasing availability of fodder for horses in 1864 led the Confederate Trans-Mississippi Department to issue an order proscribing the raising of additional mounted regiments in Arkansas. However, when General Sterling Price received authorization to conduct a campaign in Missouri that fall, several of the new regiments were mounted in order to accompany him. As a result, the 44th, 45th, 46th, 47th, and 48th were officially mounted infantry regiments instead of cavalry regiments. They were rarely referred to in contemporary reports and orders by numerical designation. Price referred to them as McGehee's Cavalry, Crabtree's Cavalry, etc., which eventually resulted in their later being referred to as 44th Cavalry, 46th Cavalry, etc.

William O. Coleman was formally assigned as the commander of the 46th Arkansas Mounted, while several of the former Coleman's officers and men (e.g. Captain Jones) were reassigned to other regiments such as the 45th Arkansas Infantry (Mounted). The unit was composed of companies from Greene, Independence, Jackson, Van Buren and White counties:

Officer appointments in the 40-series regiments date from the June to August 1864 time frame, so it is assumed that the regiments were mustered into service about the same time at various points in northeast Arkansas. The list of regimental officers follows:

Colonel William O. Coleman
Lieutenant Colonel John W. Crabtree
Lieutenant Colonel S. J. McGuffin
Major E.N. Floyd
Captain James Rutherford, Acting Quartermaster
First Lieutenant Robert Weaver, Adjutant
Captain A. C. Dunaway, Acting Commissary
S.W. Allen, Surgeon
P.N.A. Billingsly, Sergeant Major

There are no known muster rolls of the 46th Arkansas Mounted Infantry and no record of enlistments. Apart from a few prisoner of war records, the records of this regiment consist of paroles of soldiers who surrendered at Jacksonport, Arkansas, on June 5, 1865. The following list commanders is composed almost entirely from the Jacksonport parole records:

- Company A, Commanded at the surrender by 1LT Samuel P. Wycough, enlisted in Batesville, Independence *County.
- Company B, Commanded at the surrender by 1LT Harrison Blevins enlisted in Independence County
- Company C, Commanded by Capt. William H. Lenox, enlisted in Jacksonport, Jackson County
- Company D, Unknown
- Company E, Unknown
- Company F, Commanded by Capt. J.T. Spring, enlisted at Jacksonport, Jackson County
- Company G, Commanded by Capt. B. W. Bolton, enlisted in White County
- Company H, Unknown
- Company I, Commanded by Capt. J.T. Johnson.
- Company K, Commanded at the surrender by 2LT James B. Stalling

There is also a Floyds company mentioned.

== Service ==
It appears that the 46th was originally assigned to Colonel Thomas H. McCray's brigade and operated as part of General Shelby's division in northeast Arkansas in the summer of 1864. The regiments organized by Colonel McCray were apparently ready for operations by 25 July 1864 when Brigadier General Shelby ordered McCray's Brigade to move south and attack the railroad near Brownsville, in current day Lonoke County, Arkansas. The purpose of these attacks were to cut off supplies to the Union army under General Steele in Little Rock, which was dependent on supplies flowing up the Arkansas River and down the rail road from Duvall's Bluff, Arkansas. In response to Colonel McCray's movements, Union Brigadier General Joseph R. West conducted an expedition from Little Rock to the Little Red River, August 7–14, 1864 in attempt to destroy McCray's forces. West's forces encountered some of McCray's forces at Hickor Plains, Arkansas, on August 7, 1864, and captured seven prisoners. Shelby reported that McCray succeeded in tearing up track and burning several trestles.

In late August 1864, Colonel McCray and his brigade accompanied General Shelby in a raid against Union hay cutting operations in west of DeValls Bluff in Prairie County, Arkansas. The purpose of this operation was to draw union forces east of Little Rock, in order to provide a diversion for General Sterling Price's crossing of the Arkansas River west of Little Rock. McCray's brigade functioned as the reserve for Shelby's attack on Ashley's Station and four other hay cutting stations west of DeValls Bluff, in which Shelby succeeded in capturing Colonel Greenville M. Mitchell, and over 500 troops of the 54th Illinois Infantry Regiment. General Price crossed the Arkansas River near Dardanelle on September 7, 1864, on his way to link up with General Shelby at Batesville in order to prepare for his raid on Missouri.

Major General Sterling Price issued General Order No. 8, dated September 18, 1864, which shifted the 46th, under the command of Colonel Coleman from Colonel McCray's brigade, in Major General James F. Fagan's division, to Brigadier General Joe Shelby's division of Missouri troops, of Sterling Price's Army of Missouri, for Price's Missouri Expedition (commonly referred to a Price's Raid). The 46th is listed as an unattached command, (meaning not assigned to a brigade) in Shelby's division. However reports of Union officers opposing Price indicate that the 46th was still included in Colonel McCray's Brigrade. Brigadier General Thomas Ewing, Jr., reporting on the composition of the Confederate forces which attacked Pilot Knob (Fort Davidson) on September 27, 1864, list Coleman's Regiment as being assigned to McCray's Brigade. Lieutenant A.M. Jackson, reporting on the composition of Price's Army on November 3, 1864, lists McCray's Brigade as including, Colonel Reves, Colonel Crandell's (47th Arkansas), Colonel Baber's (45th Arkansas) and Colonel Crabtree's (46th Arkansas) Regiments.

The confusion over which division the 46th Arkansas was assigned to and whether it was under the command of Colonel Coleman or Lieutenant Colonel Crabtree during Price's raid may be clarified by an article that Colonel Coleman wrote for the Confederate Veteran Magazine in May 1909. Coleman indicates that following Shelby's raid on Ashley's Station, he was sent north in to Missouri, ahead of Price's army, to organize new units. This he apparently did, joining Price's force in Missouri. Since Fagan's Division was intended to include all Arkansas Troops, while Marmaduke's Division was mainly Missouri troops, this would have left the 46th assigned to Fagan's Division, and probably McCray's Brigade, as described by Brigadier General Ewing and Lieutenant Jackson. Confederates often referred to regiments by the name of their commander, and Colonel Coleman's regiment is mentioned on several occasions in various reports from Price's Raid. The 46th was involved in the following actions during Price's Raid: Some of these reports appear to refer to the 46th Arkansas as Coleman's Regiment, and others appear to be describing the new command that Coleman organized at the very beginning of Price's Raid.

- Price's Missouri Raid, Arkansas-Missouri-Kansas, September–October 1864
- Battle of Fort Davidson (September 27, 1864)
- Fourth Battle of Boonville (October 11)
- Battle of Glasgow, Missouri (October 15)
- Battle of Sedalia (October 15)
- Second Battle of Lexington (October 19)
- Battle of Little Blue River (October 21)
- Second Battle of Independence (October 21–22)
- Battle of Byram's Ford (October 22–23)
- Battle of Westport (October 23)
- Battle of Marais des Cygnes, Linn County, Kansas, (October 25)
- Battle of Mine Creek (October 25)
- Battle of Marmiton River (October 25)
- Second Battle of Newtonia (October 28)

After the completion of Price's raid, the 46th was furloughed to return to the area from which it was recruited in order to forage and recover absentees and to return to the army at a prescribed date. A scouting report made by Major Harris S. Greeno, of the 4th Arkansas Cavalry (U. S. Army), November 15, 1864, made from Devalls Bluff relayed information on the post raid condition of the 46th Arkansas Cavalry:

... I captured 3 more deserters from Price's army at Fairview, who claimed to belong to Coleman's regiment. From these men I learned that Lieutenant-Colonel Crabtree, commanding Coleman's regiment, was marching in the direction of Searcy, and that he intended to make Searcy his headquarters ...

From all the information I was able to obtain the condition of affairs in Northern Arkansas at the present time is as follows:

There has already returned to Batesville, Jacksonport, and Searcy three regiments, all under Colonel McCray. These regiments are Coleman's, Crandall's, and Baber's. Coleman's regiment, commanded by Lieutenant-Colonel Crabtree, when all together, numbers about 300 men; Crandall's and Baber's some 250 each, but of these two-thirds of the men have deserted, and say they will never go out again. They have thrown away their arms and are nearly all at their homes. They are all greatly demoralized and discouraged; those I saw all agree in the statement that Price's army was badly whipped at every point, and all greatly demoralized, and large numbers are deserting.

Major Greeno stated that he had attempted to engage Lieutenant Colonel Crabtree but the unit had scattered:

On the morning of the 12th instant I moved back with my command in the direction of Searcy, intending to hunt up Crabtree and give him fight. ... on the morning of the 13th instant I sent a detachment up the Searcy Valley to ascertain the whereabouts of the rebel forces. The detachment returned during the afternoon and reported that the regiment under Crabtree had scattered in every direction and would not give me a fight. We captured a Captain Bolton, of Coleman's regiment, and two of his men.

Lieutenant Colonel Crabtree was captured by Colonel Matterson of the Third Minnesota near Augusta, Arkansas, on December 15, 1864, along with approximately thirty of his men.

=== The execution ===
A member of Company A, 46th Arkansas Mounted Infantry, Private Harvey H. Blackburn, was executed by Union authorities in retaliation for the alleged murder of Major James Wilson, Third Cavalry Missouri State Militia, and six men of his command by Confederate Colonel and alleged guerrilla Tim Reves during Price's Raid. Private Blackburn and the other men executed were not connected in any way with the incident, but were selected at random from among prisoners of war being held by the United States at Gratiot Street Military Prison, St. Louis, Missouri.

HEADQUARTERS DEPARTMENT OF MISSOURI,

Office of the Provost-Marshall-General,

Saint Louis, Mo., October 29, 1864.

Col. J. V. Du Bois, Chief of Staff, in the Field:

Colonel--I have the honor to inform the commanding general that on this day the following rebel soldiers--James W. Gates, Company H, Third Missouri Cavalry, CSA; Harvey H. Blackburn, Company A, Coleman's regiment, CSA; John Nichols, Second Missouri Cavalry, CSA; Charles W. Minneken, Company A, Crabtree's cavalry, CSA; Asa V. Ladd, Burbridge's regiment, Missouri Cavalry; CSA; and George F. Bunch, Company B, Third Missouri Cavalry, CSA--were executed by being shot to death by musketry in retaliation for the murder of six men of the Third Cavalry Missouri State Militia by Tim Reves' guerrillas, and in compliance with Special Orders, No. 277, paragraph 12, dated Headquarters Department of the Missouri, Saint Louis, Missouri, October 6, 1864.

I respectfully inclose records in the case.

I have the honor to be, very respectfully,

JOSEPH DARR, Jr.,

Acting Provost-Marshall-General.

Another soldier from the 46th Arkansas Mounted Infantry, John N. Ferguson, was also originally scheduled to be executed in the same action, but at the last minute his name was removed from the execution order because it was found that he had "never bore arms" and was only a teamster. Another soldier, Private George F. Bunch, Company B, Third Missouri Cavalry, who apparently had "borne arms", was substituted for Ferguson and was executed along with Private Blackburn on October 29, 1864. Despite his reprieve from execution, Ferguson did not survive his imprisonment. He died on April 5, 1865, while still a prisoner of war, and is buried at Jefferson Barracks.

== Surrender ==
Brigadier General M. Jeff Thompson surrendered his command at Chalk Bluff, Arkansas, on May 11, 1865, and agreed to have his men assemble at Wittsburg and Jacksonport, Arkansas, to lay down their arms and receive their paroles. Thompson's command was widely dispersed throughout northeast Arkansas, more for reasons of available forage than anything else. The 46th Arkansas Cavalry surrendered with its command structure intact and was paroled at Jacksonport on June 5, 1865. At the time of the surrender, the regiment was assigned to the following command: Military Sub-District of Northeast Arkansas and Southeast Missouri, commanded by Brigadier General M. Jeff. Thompson (Surrendered at Jacksonport), McCray's Brigade, commanded by Colonel Thomas H. McCray (Surrendered at Jacksonport), 46th Arkansas Mounted Infantry, commanded by Colonel William O. Coleman (Surrendered at Jacksonport).

== See also ==
- List of Confederate units from Arkansas
- Confederate Units by State

== Bibliography ==
- Allen, Desmond Walls. (1988). Forty-fifth Arkansas Confederate Cavalry. Conway, AR: Arkansas Research. ISBN 0-941765-36-9.
- Castel, Albert. (1968). General Sterling Price and the Civil War in the West. Baton Rouge, LA: Louisiana State University Press.
- Kerby, Robert L. (1972). Kirby Smith's Confederacy: The Trans-Mississippi South, 1863-1865. Tuscaloosa, AL: The University of Alabama Press.
- Mobley, Freeman. (2005). Making Sense of the Civil War in Batesville-Jacksonport and Northeast Arkansas, 1861-1874. Batesville, AR: P.D. Printing.
- Monaghan, Jay. (1956). Swamp Fox of the Confederacy: The Life and Military Services of M. Jeff Thompson. Tuscaloosa, AL: Confederate Publishing Co.
- Donat, P. Fagan's Attack on Fayetteville. Flashback, 35, No. 4 (November 1985): 8-13.
- Feathers, Tom C. "The History of Military Activities in the Vicinity of Fayetteville Arkansas, Including the Battle of Fayetteville and the Siege of Fayetteville During the War Between the States." Washington County Flashback, 3 (April 1953): 2-33.
