= 45th Arkansas Infantry (Mounted) =

American Civil War Confederate Army regiment

- Active: 1864–1865
- Country: Confederate States
- Allegiance: Arkansas
- Branch: Army
- Type: Infantry
- Size: Regiment
- Facings: Light blue
- Engagements: Price's Missouri Raid, Battle of Fort Davidson, Fourth Battle of Boonville, Battle of Glasgow, Missouri, Battle of Sedalia, Second Battle of Lexington, Battle of Little Blue River, Second Battle of Independence, Battle of Byram's Ford, Battle of Westport, Battle of Marais des Cygnes, Battle of Mine Creek, Battle of Marmiton River, Second Battle of Newtonia

The 45th Arkansas Infantry (Mounted) (1864–1865) was a Confederate Army Mounted Infantry regiment during the American Civil War. While authorized by the State Military Board as an infantry regiment, the unit was mounted for Price's Missouri Expedition and was officially designated as mounted infantry. Due to its mounted status, the unit is sometimes referred to as the 45th Arkansas Cavalry when a numerical designation is used. The unit is most often referred to as either Baber's Arkansas Cavalry Regiment or Clark's Arkansas Cavalry Regiment, after its two commanders. After the war many former members referred to the regiment as "Shaver's Cavalry" because of the large number of officers and men who had previously served in Colonel R. G. Shaver's 7th Arkansas Infantry Regiment and 38th Arkansas Infantry Regiment, but Colonel Shaver was never actually associated with the unit.

== Organization ==
In May 1864, General Joseph O. Shelby occupied Northeast Arkansas, well behind Union Army lines. In early June 1864, General Shelby commissioned Colonel Thomas Hamilton McCray, among others, to begin raising regiments in Northeast Arkansas. By June 13, Shelby reported to General Sterling Price that McCray's efforts were bearing fruit.

The work of recruiting goes bravely on. Colonel McCray will have a brigade and Dobbin, Coffee, Freeman and Coleman will have regiments.

Colonel McCray's efforts led to the recruitment of at least three regiments, the 45th, 46th and 47th Arkansas Infantry Regiments. These 40-series regiments consisted mostly of conscripts, and absentees from existing units, organized around a small cadre of veterans detailed from infantry regiments, which were expected to be idle during the fall and winter of 1864.

The decreasing availability of fodder for horses in 1864 led the Confederate Trans-Mississippi Department to issue an order proscribing the raising of additional mounted regiments in Arkansas. However, when General Sterling Price received authorization to conduct a campaign in Missouri that fall, several of the new regiments were mounted in order to accompany him. As a result, the 44th, 45th, 46th, 47th, and 48th were officially mounted infantry regiments instead of cavalry regiments. They were rarely referred to in contemporary reports and orders by numerical designation. Price referred to them as McGehee's Cavalry, Crabtree's Cavalry, etc., which eventually resulted in their later being referred to as 44th Cavalry, 46th Cavalry, etc.

The unit was composed of companies from the following counties:

- Company A, was originally commanded by Captain J. Washburn and was organized in Independence County, at or near Sulphur Rock. Its members were principally residents of White River, Big Bottom and Black River Townships of Independence County. It was surrendered at Jacksonport by Lieutenant John Morgan Owen.

- Company B, commanded by Captain John M. Cost, was organized at Jacksonport, and its members were principally residents of Independence County, mostly from Christian, Big Bottom, White River and Black River Townships. A few men from Jefferson Township of Jackson County were also enrolled in this company.

- Company C, commanded by Captain Joshua Wann, was organized in Lawrence County, at or near Evening Shade (in present Sharp County). Many of the men in this company came from the western part of Lawrence County, that part which became Sharp County in 1868.

- Company D, commanded by Captain Allen Nesbitt was raised in northern Jackson County and may have been organized at Elgin or Centerville, in Bird Township. It was composed primarily of men from Bird Township. Captain Nesbitt and several other members of the company had previously served in Colonel Thomas H. McCray's 31st Arkansas Infantry Regiment as members of Company A. (Col. James W. Clark had also served as an officer of this company.) The 31st served east of the Mississippi, and many of its men had returned home on furloughs and were unable to rejoin their units in 1864 or had received disability discharges.

- Company E, commanded by Captain Samuel R. Fetzer, was organized in Independence County, its members coming primarily from Black River, Gainsboro, White River and Ruddell Townships.

- Company F, commanded by Captain Jacob Wallace, was organized at New Hope Baptist Church, about seven miles west of Powhatan, in Lawrence County. It was composed almost entirely of men from Lawrence County.

- Company G, commanded by Captain Edward Butler, was organized at Powhatan, Lawrence County, and was composed almost entirely of Lawrence County men.

- Company H, commanded by Captain Wiley C. Jones, was organized in Lawrence County and was composed of men from several areas of that county west of Black River.

- Company I, was organized at Augusta, Woodruff County, by Captain J. B. Hills of Jonesboro. It contained many names familiar in the history of Woodruff County, especially from Bayou Cache and Bayou DeView Townships, which were part of Jackson County prior to the creation of Woodruff County in 1862, and Jackson County, especially Richwoods and Breckenridge Townships. About one-fourth of its men were from Craighead County.

- Company K, commanded by Captain L. P. Schmick, was composed primarily of men from Randolph County, where it was organized, but also included a few from other counties, particularly Greene County.

- Company L, commanded by Captain M. S. Gray, was from different parts of Lawrence County east of Black River.

- Company M, commanded by Captain John Hale, was organized in Jackson County and was composed primarily of men from Cache, Richwoods and Village Townships of Jackson County.

Officer appointments in the 40-series regiments date from the June to August 1864 time frame, so it is assumed that the regiments were mustered into service about the same time at various points in northeast Arkansas. The list of regimental officers follows:

Baber, Milton D. Colonel

Colonel Milton D. Baber, Commander, 45th Arkansas Mounted Infantry

Clark, J.W. Lieutenant Colonel, Later Colonel
Jones, G.R. Major, Later Lieutenant Colonel
Washburn, C.J. Originally Captain of Company A, later Major
Wells, John R. Cpt Asst Surgeon.
Black, David C. Captain and Acting Quartermaster.
Sloan. William C. Captain and Acting Commissary

According to some family histories, few uniforms were available for the new regiment, so in order to establish uniformity and company identification, each company would place a certain type of feather on a designated side of their hats.

Colonel Milton Dyer Baber, who had previously served as the Major and Lieutenant Colonel of the 38th Arkansas Infantry Regiment, was appointed Colonel of the 45th Arkansas Mounted infantry. Colonel Baber was captured during the Price's Raid, so after October 1864, the regiment was referred to as Clark's Arkansas Cavalry (Lieutenant-Colonel James W. Clark succeeded Baber as regimental commander). Many of the men in the regiment had served in the 38th Arkansas Infantry.

The regimental records of the 45th were destroyed by fire in the wagon in which they were being carried during the raid. Hence there are no known muster rolls of the 45th Arkansas Mounted Infantry and no record of enlistments. Apart from a few prisoner of war records, the records of this regiment consist of paroles of soldiers who surrendered at Jacksonport, Arkansas, on June 5, 1865.

== Service ==
The 45th was assigned to Colonel Thomas H. McCray's brigade and operated as part of General Shelby's division in northeast Arkansas in the summer of 1864. The regiments organized by Colonel McCray were apparently ready for operations by 25 July 1864 when Brigadier General Shelby ordered McCray's Brigade to move south and attack the railroad near Brownsville, in current day Lonoke County, Arkansas. The purpose of these attacks were to cut off supplies to the Union army under General Steele in Little Rock, which was dependent on supplies flowing up the Arkansas River and down the rail road from Duvall's Bluff, Arkansas. In response to Colonel McCray's movements, Union Brigadier General Joseph R. West conducted an expedition from Little Rock to the Little Red River, August 7–14, 1864 in attempt to destroy McCray's forces. Wests forces encountered some of McCray's forces at Hickor Plains, Arkansas, on August 7, 1864, and captured seven prisoners. Shelby reported that McCray succeeded in tearing up track and burning several trestles.

In late August 1864, Colonel McCray and his brigade accompanied General Shelby in a raid against Union hay cutting operations in west of DeValls Bluff in Prairie County, Arkansas. The purpose of this operation was to draw union forces east of Little Rock, in order to provide a diversion for General Sterling Price's crossing of the Arkansas River west of Little Rock. McCray's brigade functioned as the reserve for Shelby's attack on Ashley's Station and four other hay cutting stations west of DeValls Bluff, in which Shelby succeeded in capturing Colonel Greenville M. Mitchell, and over 500 troops of the 54th Illinois Infantry Regiment. General Price crossed the Arkansas River near Dardanelle on September 7, 1864, on his way to link up with General Shelby at Batesville in order to prepare for his raid on Missouri.

The 45th and Colonel McCray's brigade, was assigned to Maj. Gen. James F. Fagan's division, of Sterling Price's Army of Missouri, for Price's Missouri Expedition (commonly referred to a Price's Raid). The 45th fought in some of the most fierce combat operations on Price's Raid. Its war record is mixed. It was hampered due to lack of ammunition, food, blankets weapons, and uniforms. It also was hampered by leadership who were used to operating as Infantry, and several of the men were conscripts, and deserters. Colonel Baber was captured in the fight near Independence, Missouri, on October 22, 1864. Upon Colonel Baber's capture, Lieutenant Colonel John W. Clark assumed command of the regiment. Major George R. James was promoted to Lieutenant Colonel and Captain C. J. Wasburn, who had previously commanded Company A, was advanced to the rank of Major. According to John Edward's "Shelby and his Men", and the book "Action Before Westport", the crossing of the Little Blue on the afternoon and evening of the 21st of October 1864 was met with fierce Federal resistance. Elements of Fagan's Division (which the 45th belonged to) were trying to protect the crossing and Price's very long train. Cabell's brigade was ordered to protect the train in order to allow Fagan's troops to concentrate on forcing the crossing. Somewhere during that time frame Colonel Baber was captured, however the records are not clear as to exactly when or how Colonel Baber was captured. Colonel Baber was sent first to Alton prison and then transferred to Camp Douglas. While a prisoner of war, Colonel Baber wrote letters on behalf of the enlisted prisoners requesting blankets.

Price's Missouri Raid, Arkansas-Missouri-Kansas, September–October 1864
Battle of Fort Davidson (September 27, 1864)
Fourth Battle of Boonville (October 11)
Battle of Glasgow, Missouri (October 15)
Battle of Sedalia (October 15)
Second Battle of Lexington (October 19)
Battle of Little Blue River (October 21)
Second Battle of Independence (October 21–22)
Battle of Byram's Ford (October 22–23)
Battle of Westport (October 23)
Battle of Marais des Cygnes, Linn County, Kansas, (October 25)
Battle of Mine Creek (October 25)
Battle of Marmiton River (October 25)
Second Battle of Newtonia (October 28)

The 45th also participated in the ill-fated Siege of Fayetteville, Arkansas, as a part of General Fagan's operations against the Federals holding Fayetteville, upon their return to Arkansas after Price's Raid in November 1864. After the completion of Price's raid, the 45th was furloughed to return to the area from which it was recruited in order to forage and recover absentees and to return to the army at a prescribed date.

At Boonsborough, on the suggestion of General Fagan, I detached two of his brigades (McCray's and Dobbin's), along with Freeman's brigade, of Marmaduke's division, to take the route to Northeast Arkansas, with instructions to collect all stragglers and deserters, and report south of the Arkansas River, at or near Washington, by the 15th, 20th, and 25th days of December, respectively

A scouting report made by Major Harris S. Greeno, of the 4th Arkansas Cavalry (U. S. Army), November 15, 1864, made from Devalls Bluff relayed information on the post raid condition of the 45th Arkansas Cavalry. Maj. Greeno had just learned from deserters and captured Confederate soldiers who had served in Price's Army that Colonel T. H. McCray was en route by way of White River to Jacksonport with the 45th. 46th and 47th Arkansas Regiments. He gave the strength of the 45th Arkansas as about 250 men, and his description of the morale of the men in this regiment, as well as the others, was probably very accurate:

...of these two thirds of the men have deserted and they will never go out again. They have thrown away their arms and are nearly all at their homes. They are all greatly demoralized and discouraged...

== Surrender ==
Brigadier General M. Jeff Thompson, Commander of the Military Sub-District of Northeast Arkansas and Southeast Missouri, to which the 45th Arkansas was assigned at the close of the war, surrendered his command at Chalk Bluff, Arkansas, on May 11, 1865. At the time of the surrender, the regiment was assigned to the following command: Military Sub-District of Northeast Arkansas and Southeast Missouri, commanded by Brigadier General M. Jeff. Thompson (Surrendered at Jacksonport), McCray's Brigade, commanded by Colonel Thomas H. McCray (Surrendered at Jacksonport), 45th Arkansas Mounted Infantry, commanded by Colonel James W. Clark (Surrendered at Jacksonport). While most men on the Jacksonport parole lists actually served in the 45th Arkansas regiment during the war, some were attached to various companies in the regiment solely for the purpose of surrendering. A few probably never saw any service except marching with their relatives and neighbors to Jacksonport to receive the paroles, which were thought to provide the former confederates with some degree of protection from later arrest or capture.

== See also ==
- List of Confederate units from Arkansas
- Confederate Units by State

== Bibliography ==
- Allen, Desmond Walls. Forty-fifth Arkansas Confederate Cavalry. (Conway, AR: Arkansas Research, 1988) ISBN 0-941765-36-9
- Castel, Albert. General Sterling Price and the Civil War in the West. (Baton Rouge, LA: Louisiana State University Press, 1968).
- Donat, P. "Fagan's Attack on Fayetteville." Flashback, 35, No. 4 (November 1985): 8-13.
- Feathers, Tom C. "The History of Military Activities in the Vicinity of Fayetteville Arkansas, Including the Battle of Fayetteville and the Siege of Fayetteville During the War Between the States." Washington County Flashback, 3 (April 1953): 2-33.
- Kerby, Robert L. Kirby Smith's Confederacy: The Trans-Mississippi South, 1863-1865. (Tuscaloosa, AL: The University of Alabama Press, 1972).
- Morgan, James Logan. A Brief History of the 45th Arkansas Cavalry Regiment, C.S.A. The Stream of History, Volume 16, Number 4 (Oct. 1978). Page 3.
- Mobley, Freeman. Making Sense of the Civil War in Batesville-Jacksonport and Northeast Arkansas, 1861-1874. (Batesville, AR: P.D. Printing, 2005).
- Monaghan, Jay. Swamp Fox of the Confederacy: The Life and Military Services of M. Jeff Thompson (Tuscaloosa, AL: Confederate Publishing Co., 1956).
- Monnett, Howard N. and Monnett, John H. Action before Westport, 1864. (University Press of Colorado, 1964). ISBN 0-87081-413-3
