= 47th Arkansas Infantry (Mounted) =

United States military unit

- Active: 1864–1865
- Country: Confederate States
- Allegiance: Arkansas
- Branch: Army
- Type: Infantry
- Size: Regiment
- Facings: Light blue
- Engagements: Price's Missouri Raid, Battle of Fort Davidson Fourth Battle of Boonville Battle of Glasgow, Missouri Battle of Sedalia Second Battle of Lexington Battle of Little Blue River Second Battle of Independence Battle of Byram's Ford Battle of Westport Battle of Marais des Cygnes, Battle of Mine Creek Battle of Marmiton River Second Battle of Newtonia

The 47th Arkansas Infantry (Mounted) (1864–1865) was a Confederate Army Mounted Infantry regiment during the American Civil War. While authorized by the State Military Board as an infantry regiment, the unit was mounted for Price's Missouri Expedition and was officially designated as mounted infantry. Due to its mounted status, the unit is sometimes referred to as the 47th Arkansas Cavalry when a numerical designation is used. The unit is most often referred to as Crandell's Arkansas Cavalry Regiment, after its commander Colonel Lee Crandell.

== Organization ==
In May 1864 General J. O. Shelby occupied Northeast Arkansas, well behind Union Army lines. In early June 1864, General Shelby commissioned Colonel Thomas Hamilton McCray, among others, to begin raising regiments in Northeast Arkansas. By June 13 Shelby reported to General Sterling Price that McCray's efforts were bearing fruit. McCray's efforts led to the recruitment of at least three new regiments, the 45th, 46th and 47th Arkansas Infantry Regiments. These 40-series regiments consisted mostly of teenagers, conscripts, and absentees from existing units, all organized around a small cadre of veterans detailed from infantry regiments expected to be idle during the fall and winter.

The decreasing availability of fodder for horses in 1864 led the Confederate Trans-Mississippi Department to prohibit the raising of additional mounted regiments in Arkansas. However, when General Sterling Price received authorization to conduct a campaign in Missouri, some of the new regiments were mounted to accompany him. The 44th, 45th, 46th, 47th, and 48th officially became mounted infantry regiments. They were rarely referred to in reports and orders by their numbers, and Price referred to them as McGehee's Cavalry, Crabtree's Cavalry, etc. This later resulted in their being known as the 44th Cavalry, 46th Cavalry, etc.

No muster rolls of the 47th Arkansas Mounted Infantry are known to survive. Except a few prisoner of war records, the regiment's existing records consist of only paroles of the soldiers who surrendered at Jacksonport, Arkansas, on June 5, 1865, supplemented by the pension records of some of its veterans.

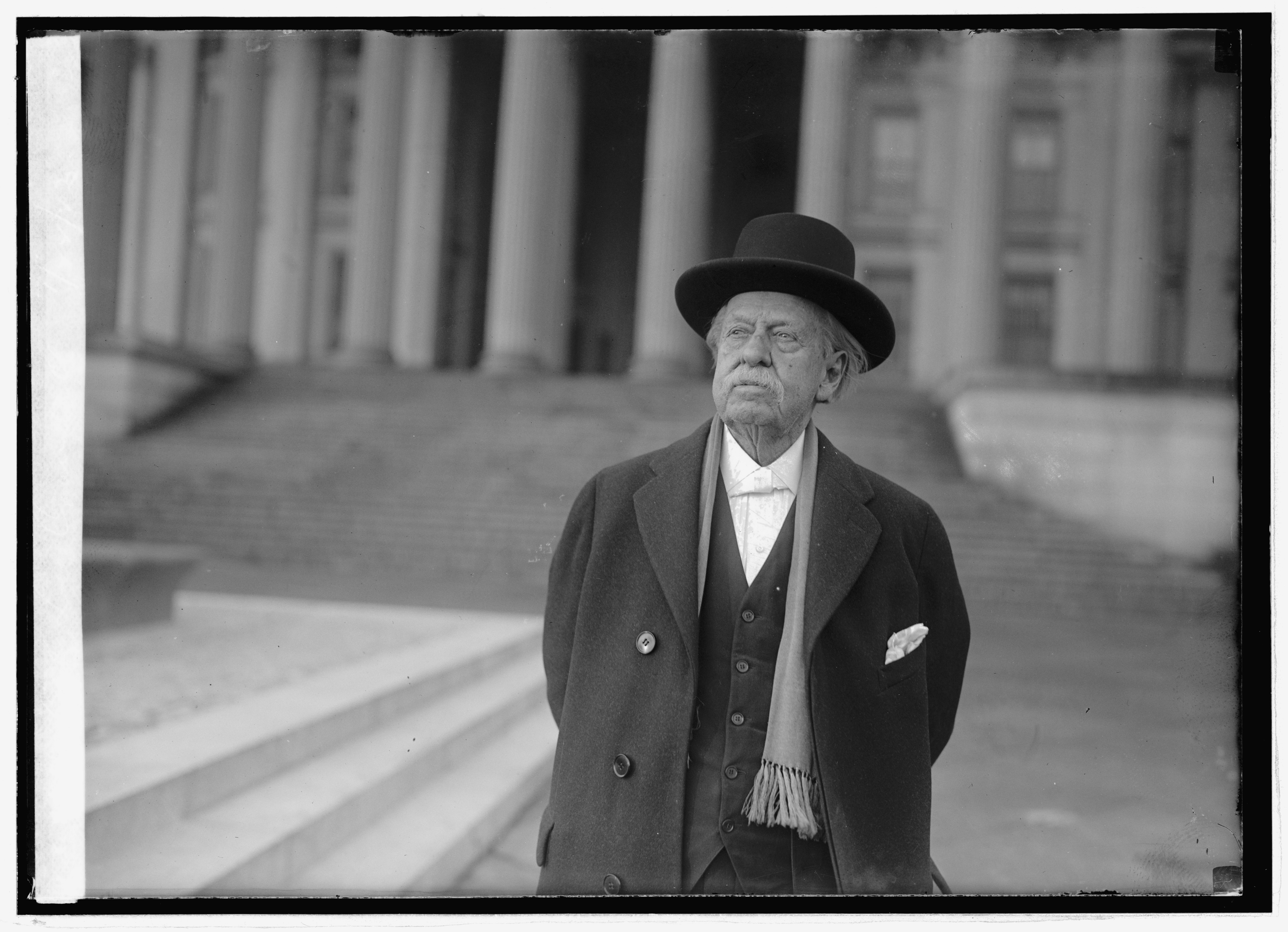
Colonel Lee Crandall, lived into his 90s and is buried in Arlington National Cemetery

Officer appointments in the 40-series regiments date from June to August 1864, so it is assumed that the regiments were mustered into service about the same time at various points in northeast Arkansas. The list of regimental officers follows:

- Crandall, Lee S. – Colonel
- Davis, R.M. – Lieutenant Colonel
- Graves, T.D. – Surgeon
- Nanna, W.S. – Major
- Hewitt, E. – Captain Adjutant
- Brady, S.H. – Surgeon
- Walker, C.M. – Assistant Surgeon
- Clayton, R. – Commissary
- Mayberry, Randolph P. – Commissary Sergeant

Based on the parole records from Jacksonport, and a few prisoner of war records the follow is known about the companies:

- Company A – Commanded by Capt. Lilburn T. Cox,
- Company B – Commanded by Capt John Wilson,
- Company C – Commanded by Capt. William Montgomery Mayo,
- Company D – Commanded by Capt. John Wilson,
- Company E – Commanded by Capt. William O. Purssell,
- Company F – Commander is unknown,
- Company G – Commanded by Capt. David M. Burks (possibly Burns),
- Company H – Commanded by Capt. James F. Lawler,
- Company I – Commanded by Capt. James Martin Lay,
- Company K – Originally commanded by a Captain Blakeney, commanded at the surrender by 2nd Lt J W Wills.

There are additional company commanders mentioned in various records, including Capt. Charles Mason, Capt. McCoy, and Capt. Williams.

Lee Salmon Crandall (1832–1926) was born in South Berlin, New York. As a young man he moved to Louisiana, where he married and made his home. Crandall entered the Confederate Army as captain of Company I, 8th Louisiana Infantry Regiment, and he led his company in the first Battle of Manassas. He was with General Stonewall Jackson through the Valley Campaign in Virginia, and was wounded in the wrist at the Battle of Cross Keys. He was promoted to major, and later was ordered to report to Major General Sterling Price at Little Rock, Arkansas. He was captured during Price's Missouri raid and spent the rest of the war as a prisoner at Johnson's Island, Ohio.

== Service ==
The 47th Arkansas Mounted Infantry was assigned to Colonel Thomas H. McCray's brigade and operated as part of General Shelby's division in northeast Arkansas in the summer of 1864. The regiments organized by Colonel McCray were apparently ready for operations by July 25, 1864, when Brigadier General Shelby ordered McCray's Brigade to move south and attack the railroad near Brownsville, in current day Lonoke County, Arkansas. These attacks were to cut off supplies to the Union army under General Steele in Little Rock, which was dependent on supplies sent up the Arkansas River and down the railroad from Duvall's Bluff, Arkansas. In response to Colonel McCray's movements, Union Brigadier General Joseph R. West conducted an expedition from Little Rock to the Little Red River, August 7–14, 1864 in attempt to destroy McCray's forces. Wests forces encountered some of McCray's men at Hickory Plains, Arkansas, on August 7, 1864, and captured seven prisoners. Nevertheless, Shelby reported that McCray had succeeded in tearing up track and burned several railroad bridges.

In late August 1864, Colonel McCray and his brigade accompanied General Shelby in a raid against Union hay cutting operations west of DeValls Bluff in Prairie County, Arkansas. The purpose was to draw Union forces east of Little Rock, to provide a diversion while General Price crossed the Arkansas River west of the city. McCray's brigade was the reserve for Shelby's attack on Ashley's Station and four other hay cutting stations west of DeValls Bluff, during which Shelby captured Colonel Greenville M. Mitchell and over 500 men of the 54th Illinois Infantry Regiment. Price crossed the Arkansas River near Dardanelle on September 7, 1864, on his way to link with General Shelby at Batesville to prepare for his raid on Missouri.

Colonel McCray's brigade was assigned to Maj. Gen. James F. Fagan's division, of Price's Army of Missouri.

The 47th was assigned to Colonel Thomas H. McCray's brigade, Maj. Gen. James F. Fagan's division, for Price's Missouri Expedition, September and October 1864.

Battle of Fort Davidson (September 27, 1864)
Fourth Battle of Boonville (October 11)
Battle of Glasgow, Missouri (October 15)
Battle of Sedalia (October 15)
Second Battle of Lexington (October 19)
Battle of Little Blue River (October 21)
Second Battle of Independence (October 21–22)
Battle of Byram's Ford (October 22–23)
Battle of Westport (October 23)
Battle of Marais des Cygnes, Linn County, Kansas, (October 25)
Battle of Mine Creek (October 25)
Battle of Marmiton River (October 25)
Second Battle of Newtonia (October 28)

At the Battle of Mine Creek, Colonel Crandall and five other field officers were captured and sent to Johnson's Island, Ohio, where Crandall remained a prisoner until the close of the war.

After Price's raid, the 47th was furloughed to return to northeastern Arkansas to forage and recover absentees, and then return to the army.

At Boonsborough, on the suggestion of General Fagan, I detached two of his brigades (McCray's and Dobbin's), along with Freeman's brigade, of Marmaduke's division, to take the route to Northeast Arkansas, with instructions to collect all stragglers and deserters, and report south of the Arkansas River, at or near Washington, by the 15th, 20th, and 25th days of December, respectively

A scouting report by Major Harris S. Greeno, of the 4th Arkansas Cavalry (U.S.), dated November 15, 1864, at Devalls Bluff, described the condition of the 45th Arkansas Cavalry. Maj. Greeno had learned from deserters and captured Confederate soldiers that Colonel T. H. McCray was en route by way of the White River to Jacksonport, with the 45th, 46th, and 47th Arkansas Regiments. He gave the strength of the 45th Arkansas as about 250 men; his description of the morale of the regiments after the disastrous end of the raid was probably quite accurate:

From all the information I was able to obtain the condition of affairs in Northern Arkansas at the present time is as follows: There has already returned to Batesville, Jacksonport, and Searcy three regiments, all under Colonel McCray. These regiments are Coleman's, Crandall's, and Baber's. Coleman's regiment, commanded by Lieutenant-Colonel Crabtree, when all together, numbers about 300 men; Crandall's and Baber's some 250 each, but of these two-thirds of the men have deserted, and say they will never go out again. They have thrown away their arms and are nearly all at their homes. They are all greatly demoralized and discouraged; those I saw all agree in the statement that Price's army was badly whipped at every point, and all greatly demoralized, and large numbers are deserting.

== Surrender ==
Brigadier General M. Jeff Thompson, Commander of the Military Sub-District of Northeast Arkansas and Southeast Missouri, to which the 47th Arkansas was assigned at the close of the war, surrendered his command at Chalk Bluff, Arkansas, on May 11, 1865, and agreed to have his men assemble at Wittsburg and Jacksonport, Arkansas, to lay down their arms and receive their paroles. Thompson's command was widely dispersed throughout northeast Arkansas, more for reasons of available forage than anything else. About a third of his men refused to surrender. Many men simply went home. The 45th Arkansas Cavalry surrendered and was paroled at Jacksonport on June 5, 1865. At the time of the surrender, the regiment was assigned to the following command: Military Sub-District of Northeast Arkansas and Southeast Missouri, commanded by Brigadier General M. Jeff. Thompson (surrendered at Jacksonport), McCray's Brigade, commanded by Colonel Thomas H. McCray (surrendered at Jacksonport), 47th Arkansas Mounted Infantry, commanded by Lieutenant Colonel Richard M. Davis (surrendered at Jacksonport).

== See also ==
- List of Confederate units from Arkansas
- Confederate Units by State

== Bibliography ==
- Allen, Desmond Walls. Forty-fifth Arkansas Confederate Cavalry. Conway, Arkansas: Arkansas Research, 1988. ISBN 0-941765-36-9
- Castel, Albert. General Sterling Price and the Civil War in the West. Baton Rouge, Louisiana: Louisiana State University Press, 1968.
- Donat, P. "Fagan's Attack on Fayetteville." Flashback, 35, No. 4 (November 1985): 8–13.
- Feathers, Tom C. "The History of Military Activities in the Vicinity of Fayetteville Arkansas, Including the Battle of Fayetteville and the Siege of *Fayetteville During the War Between the States." Washington County Flashback, 3 (April 1953): 2–33.
- Kerby, Robert L. Kirby Smith's Confederacy: The Trans-Mississippi South, 1863-1865. Tuscaloosa, Alabama: The University of Alabama Press, 1972.
- Morgan, James Logan. "A Brief History of the 45th Arkansas Cavalry Regiment, C.S.A." in The Stream of History, Volume 16, Number 4 (Oct. 1978). p. 3.
- Mobley, Freeman. Making Sense of the Civil War in Batesville-Jacksonport and Northeast Arkansas, 1861–1874. Batesville, Arkansas: P.D. Printing, 2005.
- Monaghan, Jay. Swamp Fox of the Confederacy: The Life and Military Services of M. Jeff Thompson. Tuscaloosa, Alabama: Confederate Publishing Co., 1956.
- Monnett, Howard N. and Monnett, John H. Action before Westport, 1864. University Press of Colorado, 1964. ISBN 0-87081-413-3.
