= Battle of Westport order of battle: Confederate =

The following Confederate Army units and commanders fought in the Battle of Westport of the American Civil War. The Union order of battle is listed separately.

== Abbreviations used ==
=== Military rank ===
- MG = Major General
- BG = Brigadier General
- Col = Colonel
- Ltc = Lieutenant Colonel
- Maj = Major
- Cpt = Captain
- Lt = 1st Lieutenant

=== Other ===
- w = wounded

== Army of Missouri ==
MG Sterling Price

Division	Brigade	Regiments and Others
Fagan's Division; MG James F. Fagan	Cabell's Brigade BG William L. Cabell	Gordon's Arkansas Cavalry: Col Anderson Gordon; Gunter's Arkansas Cavalry Battalion: Ltc Thomas M. Gunter; Harrell's Arkansas Cavalry Battalion: Ltc John M. Harrell; Hill's Arkansas Cavalry Battalion: Col John F. Hill; Monroe's Arkansas Cavalry: Col James C. Monroe; Morgan's Arkansas Cavalry: Col Thomas J. Morgan; Witherspoon's Arkansas Cavalry Battalion: Maj J. L. Witherspoon; Hughey's Arkansas Battery (2 guns): Cpt William M. Hughey
Fagan's Division; MG James F. Fagan	Dobbin's Brigade Col Archibald S. Dobbins	Dobbin's Arkansas Cavalry: Col Archibald S. Dobbins; McGhee's Arkansas Cavalry: Col James H. McGee (w Oct. 23), Ltc Jesse S. Grider; Witt's Arkansas Cavalry: Col A. R. Witt; Blocher's Arkansas Battery (2 guns): Lt J. V. Zimmerman
Fagan's Division; MG James F. Fagan	Slemons' Brigade Col William F. Slemons	2nd Arkansas Cavalry: Col William F. Slemons; Carlton's Arkansas Cavalry: Col Charles H. Carlton; Crawford's Arkansas Cavalry: Col William A. Crawford; Wright's Arkansas Cavalry: Col John C. Wright
Fagan's Division; MG James F. Fagan	McCray's Brigade Col Thomas H. McCray	15th Missouri Cavalry: Col Timothy Reeves; 45th Arkansas (mounted): Col Milton D. Baber; 47th Arkansas (mounted): Col Lee Crandall
Fagan's Division; MG James F. Fagan	Unattached	Anderson's Arkansas Cavalry Battalion: Cpt William L. Anderson; Lyle's Arkansas Cavalry: Col Oliver P. Lyle; Rogan's Arkansas Cavalry: Col James W. Rogan

Division	Brigade	Regiments and Others
Marmaduke's Division (1st Missouri Division); BG John S. Marmaduke; Escort: 5th Missouri Cavalry, Company D: Cpt D. R. Stallard; Advance (Scouting) Company: Cpt Page
Marmaduke's Division (1st Missouri Division); BG John S. Marmaduke; Escort: 5th Missouri Cavalry, Company D: Cpt D. R. Stallard; Advance (Scouting) Company: Cpt Page	Marmaduke's Brigade BG John Bullock Clark Jr.	3rd Missouri Cavalry Regiment: Col Colton Greene; 4th Missouri Cavalry Regiment: Col John Q. Burbridge; 7th Missouri Cavalry Regiment: Col Solomon G. Kitchen; 8th Missouri Cavalry Regiment: Col William L. Jeffers; 10th Missouri Cavalry Regiment: Col Robert R. Lawther; Davies's Missouri Cavalry Battalion: Ltc J. F. Davies; Hogan's Engineer Company: Cpt James T. Hogan (Note: Also spelled Hogane.)
Marmaduke's Division (1st Missouri Division); BG John S. Marmaduke; Escort: 5th Missouri Cavalry, Company D: Cpt D. R. Stallard; Advance (Scouting) Company: Cpt Page	Freeman's Brigade Col Thomas R. Freeman	Ford's Arkansas Cavalry Battalion: Ltc Barney Ford; Freeman's Missouri Cavalry Regiment: Ltc Joseph R. Love; Fristoe's Missouri Cavalry Regiment: Col Edward T. Fristoe
Marmaduke's Division (1st Missouri Division); BG John S. Marmaduke; Escort: 5th Missouri Cavalry, Company D: Cpt D. R. Stallard; Advance (Scouting) Company: Cpt Page	Artillery Maj Joseph H. Pratt	Harris' Missouri Battery (2 or 3 guns): Lt Thomas J. Williams (Note: Some sources identify Cpt S. S. Harris as the unit's commander.); Hynson's Texas Battery (3 guns): Cpt H. C. Hynson

Division	Brigade	Regiments and Others
Shelby's Division; BG Joseph O. Shelby	Shelby's Iron Brigade BG M. Jeff Thompson	5th Missouri Cavalry: Col B. Frank Gordon; 11th Missouri Cavalry: Col Moses W. Smith; 12th Missouri Cavalry: Ltc William H. Erwin; Crisp's Cavalry Battalion: Ltc John T. Crisp; Elliott's Missouri Cavalry: Col Benjamin F. Elliott; Johnson's Cavalry Battalion: Maj Rector Johnson; Slayback's Missouri Cavalry Battalion: Ltc Alonzo Slayback; Collin's Missouri Battery (2 guns): Cpt Richard A. Collins
Shelby's Division; BG Joseph O. Shelby	Jackman's Brigade Col Sidney D. Jackman	Hunter's Missouri Cavalry: Col DeWitt C. Hunter; Jackman's Missouri Cavalry: Ltc C. H. Nichols; Schnable's Missouri Cavalry Battalion: Ltc John A. Schnable; Williams' Missouri Cavalry Battalion: Ltc D. A. Williams; Collins' Missouri Battery (2 guns): Lt Jacob D. Connor
Shelby's Division; BG Joseph O. Shelby	Tyler's Brigade Col Charles H. Tyler	Coffee's Missouri Cavalry: Col J. T. Coffee; Perkin's Missouri Cavalry: Col Caleb Perkins; Searcey's Missouri Cavalry: Col James T. Searcey; Unorganized recruits
Shelby's Division; BG Joseph O. Shelby	Unattached	46th Arkansas Infantry (mounted): Col W. O. Coleman

== Sources ==
- Davis, Dale E. (2004). Guerrilla Operations in the Civil War: Assessing Compound Warfare During Price's Raid (Master's Thesis). Leavenworth, Kansas: U.S. Army Command and General Staff College.
- Collins, Charles D. Jr. (2016). Battlefield Atlas of Price's Missouri Expedition of 1864 (PDF). Fort Leavenworth, Kansas: Combat Studies Institute Press. ISBN 978-1-940804-27-9.
- Lause, Mark A. (2011). Price's Lost Campaign: The 1864 Invasion of Missouri. Columbia, Missouri: University of Missouri Press. ISBN 978-0-8262-1949-7.
- McGhee, James E. (2008). Guide to Missouri Confederate Regiments, 1861–1865. Fayetteville, Arkansas: University of Arkansas Press. ISBN 978-1-55728-870-7.
- Oates, Stephen B. (1994) [1961]. Confederate Cavalry West of the River. Austin, Texas: University of Texas Press. ISBN 0-292-71152-2.
