= Battle of Westport order of battle =

The order of battle for the Battle of Westport includes:

- Battle of Westport order of battle: Confederate
- Battle of Westport order of battle: Union
