= Thomas H. McCray =

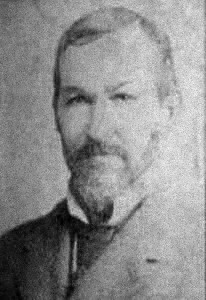
Colonel Thomas H. McCray

Thomas Hamilton McCray (1828 – Oct. 19, 1891) was an American inventor, a businessman and a Confederate States Army officer during the American Civil War.

== Biography ==
Thomas McCray was born in 1828 near Jonesborough, Tennessee, to Henry and Martha (Moore) McCray. He farmed in Tennessee and moved to Arkansas, where he operated a mill. Around 1856 he moved to Texas and operated a mill near Tellico. Just before the Civil War, he returned to Arkansas, settling in Wittsburg, Cross County. In June 1861 he joined the 5th Arkansas Infantry Regiment. He was commissioned a lieutenant and adjutant of that unit. In late 1861 he was detached from his regiment and returned to Arkansas to raise troops. He was elected major, then colonel, of the newly raised 31st Arkansas Infantry. He led a brigade of Texas and Arkansas infantry in the 1862 Kentucky Campaign. As part of Churchill's division, his brigade distinguishing itself at the August 30, 1862 Battle of Richmond, Kentucky. General Thomas J. Churchill singled out McCray for his "gallantry and coolness" in that action.

Dissatisfied at not being promoted to Brigadier General, and realizing that his regiment had shrunk to less than 150 men and would soon be consolidated with another regiment, McCray requested transfer to the Trans-Mississippi Department. There he helped raising several regiments of Arkansas cavalry. During Price's 1864 Missouri Raid he led a cavalry brigade in Fagan's division. This brigade, consisting of the newly organized and ill-equipped 45th, 46th and 47th regiments of Arkansas cavalry/mounted infantry, performed poorly. Many of the men deserted, and the brigade dissolved after the raid. McCray retained a more or less nominal district command in northeast Arkansas, "powerless for good or for evil," till war's end.

McCray is referred to as a Confederate general in numerous sources, among them Heitman's Historical Dictionary of the U.S. Army. Eicher's "Civil War High Commands" labels him a general, but suggest that the rank was in Arkansas state forces, not Confederate. He lists himself as "colonel" on his end-of-war parole, but it is possible that in 1864 he received an unofficial promotion to brigadier.

== Post war ==
Like many other Confederates, he then left for Mexico.

He then returned to Arkansas, and briefly lived in Wittsburg. After that he became a traveling salesman for the McCormick Reaper Company, based in Chicago, Illinois. Something of an inventor, McCray patented several improvements for cotton and hay presses. He died in Chicago October 19, 1891, of uremia, and was buried in the Cook County "paupers" Cemetery in Dunning, Chicago.
