= Army of Missouri =

Field army of the Confederate States

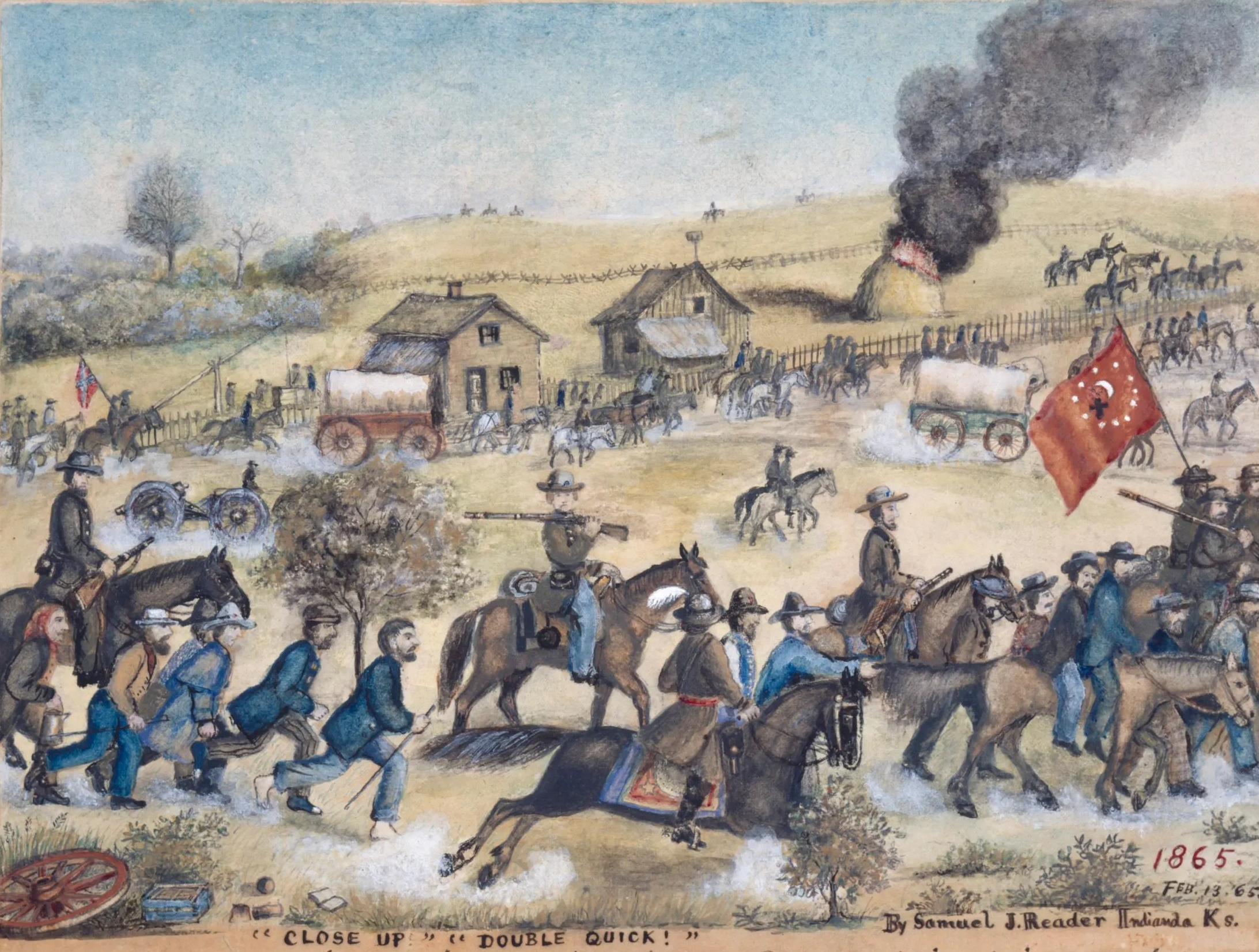
- The Price Raid by Samuel J. Reader
- Active: September – December 1864
- Disbanded: December 3, 1864
- Country: Confederate States
- Branch: Army
- Type: Field army
- Role: Headquarters
- Part of: Trans-Mississippi Department
- Campaigns: American Civil War; Price's Missouri Expedition

Commanders
- Commanding generals: Maj. Gen. Sterling Price; Brig. Gen. John B. Clark, Jr. (acting)

The Army of Missouri was a Confederate field army during the American Civil War that served as part of the Trans-Mississippi Department. It was established in September 1864 under the command of Major General Sterling Price to invade Missouri. The fall campaign was unsuccessful, and the army retreated to Arkansas, where it was broken up and reabsorbed into the Army of the Trans-Mississippi.

== Origin and formation ==
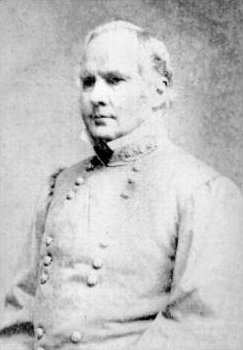
Sterling Price, who commanded the army

The Army of Missouri traces its roots to the Missouri State Guard, which was created in 1861 under Sterling Price to enforce Missouri's official stance of "armed neutrality" in the conflict, while formally remaining in the Union. The Guard eventually became part of the Confederate States Army after engaging in skirmishes with the Union troops under Nathaniel Lyon who successfully removed elected Governor Claiborne Jackson and replaced him with a pro-Union governor. As the Missouri State Guard, they would win victories over the Union at the First Battle of Lexington and Wilson's Creek, where Lyon himself was killed.

Price and his State Guard troops were subsequently incorporated into Maj. Gen. Earl Van Dorn's Army of the West, where they suffered defeats at Pea Ridge, Arkansas, Iuka, Mississippi, and Corinth, Mississippi. Following the Battle of Corinth, Price was sent back to Missouri by Confederate President Jefferson Davis but without any of the troops he had previously commanded, who remained with Van Dorn. He raised a new force, and conducted operations in Arkansas in support of Southern efforts there.

By the late summer of 1864, a good portion of the Union Army in Missouri had been reassigned eastward to aid in efforts to seize Atlanta and to help in other campaigns. The Confederacy ordered Gen. E. Kirby Smith, commander of the Trans-Mississippi Department, to send his infantry across the Mississippi River to reinforce beleaguered Southern troops in the east. However, Smith had alternative plans. He desired to "liberate" Missouri from Federal control, seizing the key cities of St. Louis and the state capital at Jefferson City, reinstating the Confederate governor and his supporters. Smith decided to send a large force of mounted infantry and cavalry under former Missouri governor Sterling Price to carry out this plan, which he also hoped might wreck Union President Abraham Lincoln's hopes for reelection that fall. Price eagerly accepted his new assignment, having previously lobbied for just such an opportunity; he named his new command "The Army of Missouri".

Considering that St. Louis was originally defended by only 8,000 Union troops (later reinforced by other Federal formations under Maj. Gen. Andrew J. Smith), Smith's hopes were not entirely unfounded–at least in the beginning. Were Price able to seize his primary objective, with its huge arsenal and warehouses filled with supplies, Union successes in Georgia and Virginia might yet be offset, leading to a loss for Lincoln and snatching a Southern victory from the jaws of defeat.

== Organization ==
The Army of Missouri was organized into three divisions, led by Maj. Gen. James F. Fagan, Maj. Gen. John S. Marmaduke and Brig. Gen. Joseph O. Shelby, all veterans of previous combat during the war. It fielded fourteen artillery pieces. A breakdown of the Army of Missouri by divisions, brigades and regiments may be seen here.

Price's men formed a rather motley crew, with a quarter of his force being made up of deserters. Hundreds of Price's men were barefoot, and most had no personal equipment such as canteens or cartridge boxes; many carried jugs for water, and stuffed ammunition in shirt and pants pockets. Nearly 4000 were unarmed, as Price was unable to procure sufficient small arms for his command. Price's orders were to strike first at St. Louis, then make for Jefferson City if that was too stoutly defended. From there Price was then to continue onward to the west, cross into Kansas and head south through the Indian Territory, "sweeping that country of its mules, horses, cattle, and military supplies".

== The Missouri expedition ==
Price's army left northeastern Arkansas on Friday, September 16, 1864. Advancing into Missouri, they chose to attack the Union garrison located at Ft. Davidson near Pilot Knob, where Price lost more than 1000 men and invaluable time engaging a target of little real significance. Unable to continue on toward St. Louis due to heavy Union reinforcement, Price turned west toward Jefferson City. Sharp skirmishes there convinced him that the capital could not be taken either, so Price continued further west toward Kansas City and nearby Fort Leavenworth, Kansas. Minor clashes ensued between Price's force and Union elements at Boonville and Glasgow, and between one of Price's brigades and Unionist militia at Sedalia. All resulted in Confederate victories. As he made his way west, Price acquired an ever-expanding wagon train loaded down with looted and captured property and materiel, as well a large herd of horses and cattle. The presence of this cavalcade increasingly limited Price's tactical options, and it ultimately became what modern U.S. Army Major Dale Davis describes in his study of Price's Raid as "an albatross to [his] withdrawal" following his defeat at Westport (see below).

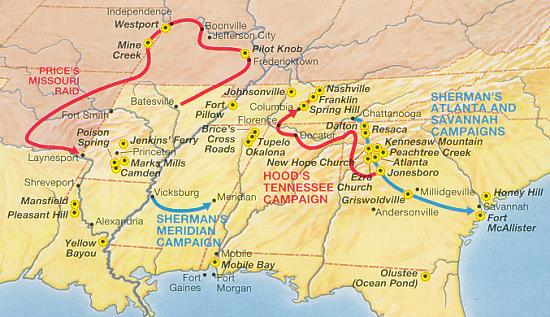
Price's Raid in the Trans-Mississippi Theater, 1864

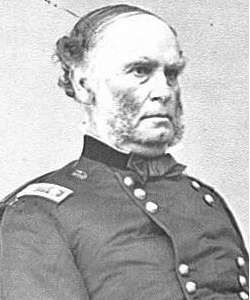
Maj. Gen. Samuel R. Curtis, USA

Union forces in Missouri, under the command of Maj. Gen. Samuel R. Curtis, were rapidly organizing to oppose Price's incursion. Curtis organized militia units in Missouri and Kansas, together with regular infantry and cavalry units, into the Army of the Border, which contained about 35,000 men in all. Meanwhile, Price's force was being steadily eroded by desertions, losses and disease; by the time of the pivotal Battle of Westport, it only numbered 8,500. In addition to dealing with Unionist militia and Curtis' force Price was also being pursued by Union Cavalry under Maj. Gen. Alfred Pleasonton, nominally under Curtis' command, but operating independently of Curtis' main element.

Price's first true test against this new Union force came at Lexington, where he drove elements of Curtis' army back toward the Little Blue River and the nearby city of Independence. Further triumphs at those two locations positioned Price's army near Westport, where Curtis' main army lay. Pleasanton finally caught up with Price at Independence, pinching the Army of Missouri between two Federal armies, each of which was larger than Price's own force. This brought on the Battle of Westport, also referred to as the "Gettysburg of the West", which saw Price's complete defeat and forced him to retreat southward through Kansas toward the Indian Territory (modern Oklahoma). Further defeats at the Marais des Cygnes River, Mine Creek, the Marmiton River and Newtonia followed, forcing Price to retreat all the way into Arkansas and eastern Texas (to avoid additional Federal troops at Fort Smith, Arkansas). The remnants of Price's weary army finally returned to Arkansas on December 2, having lost about 6,000 men. The Army of Missouri officially ceased to exist when these men were subsequently absorbed into the Army of the Trans-Mississippi where Price commanded its Cavalry Corps from December 3, 1864, to March 12, 1865.

== On to Mexico ==
Instead of surrendering at the end of the Civil War in 1865, Price and his subordinate Jo Shelby led many of their remaining troops to exile in Mexico. Price hoped to find military service under the Mexican emperor Maximilian, but this was not to be, though Maximilian did give them land for a colony near Vera Cruz. With the failure of this colony a year or so later and the overthrow and execution of Maximilian by the legitimist government of Benito Juárez, Price, Shelby and most of their men chose to return to the United States. Price's and Shelby's adventure in Mexico later became an inspiration for the John Wayne and Rock Hudson movie The Undefeated.

== Assessing the Army of Missouri's performance ==
In his paper Assessing Compound Warfare During Price's Raid, written as a thesis for the U.S. Army Command and General Staff College, Major Dale E. Davis postulates that Price's Army of Missouri failed in its campaign primarily due to Price's inability to properly employ the principles of "compound warfare". This requires an inferior power to effectively utilize regular and irregular forces in concert (such as was done by the North Vietnamese and Viet Cong against the French and Americans during the Vietnam War) to defeat a superior army. Davis also blamed Price's slow rate of movement for this outcome, and the close proximity of Confederate irregulars to his regular force.

Davis observes that by wasting valuable time, ammunition and men in his relatively meaningless assaults on Fort Davidson, Glasgow, Sedalia and Boonville, Price offered Union General Rosecrans time he might not otherwise have had to organize an effective response. Price, wrote Davis, ought to have used Confederate bushwackers to harass Federal formations, forcing the Unionists to disperse significant numbers of troops to pursue them over wide ranges of territory–which would have reduced the number of effectives available to fight against Price's main force. Instead Price kept many guerrillas close to his army, even incorporating some into his ranks, largely negating the value represented by their mobility and small, independent formations. This in turn allowed Union generals to ultimately concentrate a force large enough to trap and defeat Price at Westport, effectively ending his campaign and leading to the demise of the Army of Missouri.

== Commanders ==
- Major General Sterling Price (September 8-December 3, 1864)
- Major General John Bullock Clark Jr. (temporary: December 3, 1864)

== Engagements ==
Battle of Fort Davidson (September 27, 1864)
Fourth Battle of Boonville (October 11, 1864)
Battle of Glasgow (October 15, 1864)
Battle of Sedalia (October 15, 1864).
Second Battle of Lexington (October 19, 1864)
Battle of Little Blue River (October 21, 1864)
Second Battle of Independence (October 24, 1864)
Battle of Byram's Ford (October 22–23, 1864)
Battle of Westport (October 23, 1864)
Battle of Marais des Cygnes (October 25, 1864)
Battle of Mine Creek (October 25, 1864)
Battle of Marmiton River (October 25, 1864)
Second Battle of Newtonia (October 28, 1864)

== Bibliography ==
- Davis, Dale E., Assessing Compound Warfare During Price's Raid. Ft. Leavenworth: U.S. Army Command and General Staff College, 2004.
- Eicher, John H., & Eicher, David J., Civil War High Commands, Stanford University Press, 2001, ISBN 0-8047-3641-3.
- Monnett, Howard N. Action Before Westport: 1864 (Niwot, Colorado: University Press of Colorado), 1995 Revised Edition.
- Official Report of Maj. Gen. Sterling Price. Report made by Maj. Gen. Price at the conclusion of his campaign.
- The Battle of Pilot Knob, Section "The Ragged Assembly". Publication of Missouri Department of Natural Resources.
