= Battle of Mine Creek =

1864 battle of the American Civil War

- Part of the American Civil War
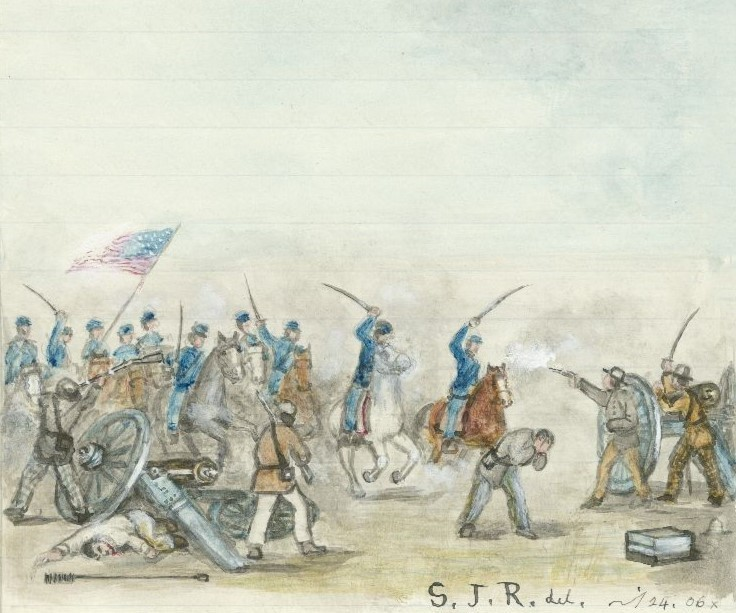
- It Went Against Us by Samuel J. Reader
Date	October 25, 1864
Location	Linn County, Kansas 38°08′42″N 94°43′24″W
Result	Union victory

Belligerents
United States (Union)	Confederate States

Commanders and leaders
(United States) Frederick W. Benteen (United States) John F. Philips	(Confederate States of America) John S. Marmaduke (POW); (Confederate States of America) James F. Fagan; (Confederate States of America) William L. Cabell (POW); (Confederate States of America) M. Jeff Thompson

Units involved
(United States) Army of the Border	(Confederate States of America) Army of Missouri

Strength
2,500–2,600	7,000

Casualties and losses
100–110	1,200
- Location within Kansas

The Battle of Mine Creek, also known as the Battle of Little Osage, was fought on October 25, 1864, in Linn County, Kansas, as part of Price's Missouri Campaign during the American Civil War. Major-General Sterling Price had begun an expedition in September 1864 to restore Confederate control of Missouri. After being defeated at Westport near Kansas City on October 23, Price's army began to retreat south through Kansas. Early on October 25, Price's army was defeated at the Marais des Cygnes. After Marais des Cygnes, the Confederates fell back, but were stalled at the crossing of Mine Creek while a wagon train attempted to cross.

Union cavalry commanded by Colonel John F. Philips and Lieutenant Colonel Frederick W. Benteen caught up to Price's army while it was stalled at the creek crossing. Confederate cavalry commanded by Major General James F. Fagan and Brigadier General John S. Marmaduke attempted to defend against the Union assault, but were soundly defeated. Many Confederate soldiers were captured, including Marmaduke. Later on the 25th, Price was again defeated at the Battle of Marmiton River. After Marmiton River, Price destroyed many of his wagons. On October 28, the Union defeated Price again at the Second Battle of Newtonia, and the shattered Confederate army reached Texas in December. The site of the battle was listed on the National Register of Historic Places in 1973 as the Battle of Mine Creek Site, and the Kansas Historical Society created the Mine Creek Battlefield State Historic Site in 1974. Mine Creek is considered to be one of the largest battles between mounted cavalry during the war.

== Background ==
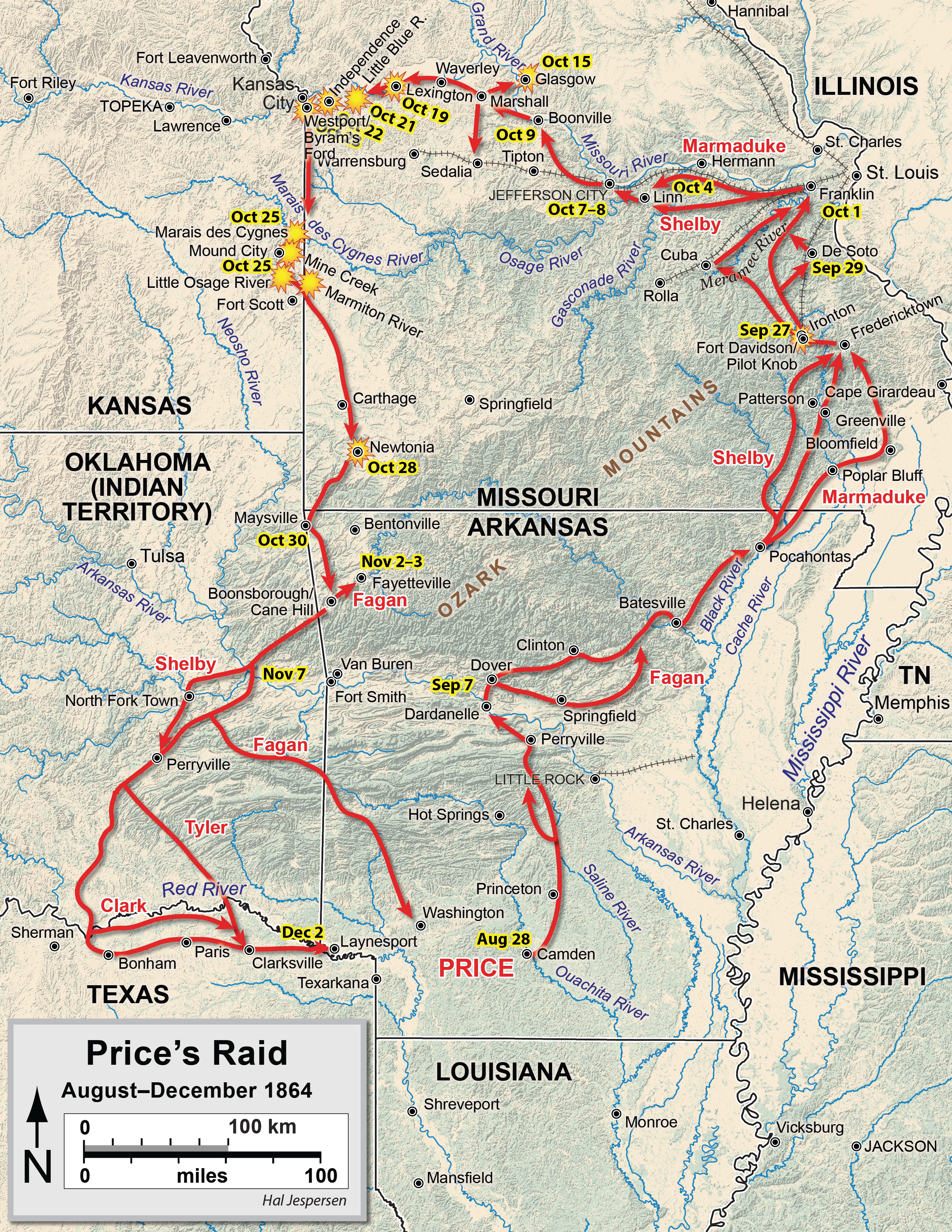
Map of Price's Raid

During the American Civil War, in the fall of 1864, Major General Sterling Price led an expedition into Missouri hoping to capture that state for the Confederacy and affect the 1864 United States Presidential Election. Price formed an army consisting of three divisions (commanded by Major General James F. Fagan and Brigadier Generals John S. Marmaduke and Joseph O. Shelby) and left Arkansas for Missouri in September. On September 26, Price's army found and assaulted a Union force near Pilot Knob. Price's army was repulsed in the ensuing Battle of Fort Davidson, although the Union garrison retreated after the battle. The Confederates then moved north towards the Missouri River and captured a small Union force at the Battle of Glasgow on October 15 and began moving towards Kansas City.

Union columns commanded by Major Generals Samuel R. Curtis and Alfred Pleasonton began pursuing Price, who won another victory at the Second Battle of Lexington on October 19. A delaying action at the Battle of Little Blue River (October 21) allowed Union forces to catch up with Price. After smaller clashes at the battles of Second Independence (October 22) and the Big Blue River (October 22 and 23), Curtis and Pleasonton decisively defeated Price's army at the Battle of Westport on October 23.

The Confederates began retreating through Kansas, and early on October 25, Price's army was defeated in a small action near the Marais des Cygnes River. Price's army was slowed during the retreat by a large supply train, which halted at the ford at Mine Creek. Union cavalry caught up to the stalled Confederates during the late morning on the 25th.

== Opposing forces ==
=== Union ===
The Union forces pursuing Price's column were all organized into the Army of the Border, commanded by Curtis. Curtis' army contained two divisions. The first was commanded by Major General James G. Blunt and consisted of four brigades, commanded by Colonels Charles R. Jennison, Thomas Moonlight, Charles W. Blair, (Note: William Fishback, a militia officer, accompanied Blair's brigade in an unofficial role.) and James H. Ford. The division was almost entirely cavalry, and contained militia units, especially in Blair's brigade. Blunt's men were from Kansas, Wisconsin, and the Colorado Territory. Curtis' second division was commanded by Pleasonton, and also contained four brigades. Pleasonton's brigades were commanded by Colonel John F. Philips, Brigadier Generals John McNeil and John B. Sanborn, and Lieutenant Colonel Frederick W. Benteen. Like Blunt's division, Pleasonton's division was primarily cavalry and contained a substantial militia element. Pleasonton's units were from Missouri, Kansas, Illinois, Iowa, and Indiana.

=== Confederate ===
Price had divided his force into three divisions, commanded by Marmaduke, Shelby, and Fagan. Fagan's division contained four brigades, commanded by Brigadier General William L. Cabell and Colonels William F. Slemons, Archibald S. Dobbins, and Thomas H. McCray. Several miscellaneous units were assigned to Fagan's division, but not placed in any brigade. Fagan's units were from Arkansas and Missouri. Marmaduke's division consisted of two brigades, commanded by Brigadier General John Bullock Clark Jr. and Colonel Thomas R. Freeman. Marmaduke's men were from Missouri, Arkansas, and Texas. Shelby's division contained three brigades, commanded by militia officer M. Jeff Thompson and Colonels Sidney D. Jackman and Charles H. Tyler. The men of Shelby's division were from Arkansas and Missouri. Price's army consisted almost entirely of cavalry.

== Battle ==
Despite the skirmish near the Marais des Cygnes, Price did not believe his force was in substantial danger, and sent Shelby's division towards Fort Scott to make an attempt at capturing the post. Marmaduke and Fagan remained with some of the wagon train near the crossing of Mine Creek, north of the Little Osage River. The crossing of Mine Creek was not easily navigated, and a pileup soon formed. The Confederates decided to make a stand north of the creek in an attempt to protect the wagons. Fagan and Marmaduke formed an 800 yards (730 m)-long line, with Fagan on the left and Marmaduke on the right. Four cannons were positioned in the center of the line, and two more were posted on each flank. The Confederate line was defended by an estimated 7,000 men.

Some of the leading Union troops caught up with the Confederate column. However, Blunt's division was lagging, and would not arrive in time for the battle. Philips' brigade reached the field first, and a long-range fight began. The Confederates used their artillery; Philips' force lacked artillery, and was forced to be contented with long-range fire from repeating rifles. Cabell entertained the thought of attacking Philips with his brigade of Confederates, but decided against a charge due to the disorganization of the Confederate line and the arrival of Benteen's Union brigade. Combined, Philips' and Benteen's brigades numbered about 2,500 to 2,600 men. Despite being outnumbered, the Union commanders decided to attack the Confederate line. One of the driving factors behind the decision to attack was Benteen's belief that the Confederates had made an error in the emplacement of their artillery. The Confederate cannons were placed close to the front line, and would only have the chance to fire one or two rounds before a cavalry charge could reach them.

The Union charge was made while the cavalrymen were still mounted; the Confederate forces were also on horseback. The Union attack faltered during the middle of the charge, when both the 10th Missouri Cavalry of Benteen's brigade and Philips' brigade stopped the attack before reaching the Confederate line. The 10th Missouri had met heavy small arms fire from the Confederate lines stopped under the fire, and Philips halted his brigade to keep in line with Benteen. This left the Union cavalrymen stationary and vulnerable to a potential Confederate counterattack. The Confederates were too disorganized to attempt a counterattack and the 4th Iowa Cavalry of Benteen's brigade broke the impasse by renewing the attack. The 3rd Iowa Cavalry followed the 4th Iowa, and eventually the whole of Benteen's brigade rejoined the charge. Benteen's force aimed for the center of Marmaduke's side of the Confederate line, and Philips' brigade headed towards Fagan's left flank once the unit resumed forward progress.

Once Benteen and Philips reached the main Confederate line, the position did not hold long. The Union troopers' repeating rifles gave them a firepower advantage over the Confederates, who were mostly armed with single-shot weapons. Clark's Confederate brigade became engaged in a melee, and quickly fell back. Marmaduke's other brigade, Freeman's, contained mainly newly recruited men and fell back before the Union charge completely reached their line. After Clark and Freeman fell back, the position of Cabell's Confederate brigade became exposed, and it too retreated. Soon, almost the entire Confederate line was in retreat towards the crossing of Mine Creek. Unable to cross the creek, many of the Confederates soldiers were captured. One of the prisoners was Marmaduke himself. The Confederate general was captured by Private James Dunlavy of the 3rd Iowa. As a reward for capturing Marmaduke, Dunlavy was given military leave for the remainder of his time of service. Dunlavy later received the Medal of Honor for "[g]allantry in capturing Gen. Marmaduke". Cabell was also made a prisoner, and the Union troops captured either eight or ten cannons.

Philips' and Benteen's brigades crossed the ford and continuing pursuing the Confederates. Confusion began to overtake the field, partially because many of the Confederates were wearing captured Union uniforms. Fagan attempted to rally his forces into a line capable of halting the Union pursuit, but the attempt failed. Pleasonton and Curtis arrived on the field late in the fighting, and the battle ended when Pleasonton ordered Benteen and Philips to stop the pursuit.

== Aftermath ==
Confederate casualties are estimated to have numbered around 1,200. Union losses were around 100 to 110. Shelby's division returned in time to provide a rear guard for the defeated Confederates. Price's surviving wagons would again be delayed late on the 25th, this time at the crossing of the Marmaton River. After a short fight at the Battle of Marmiton River, Price decided to destroy all of the wagons that did not contain essential military supplies. The retreating Confederates were again defeated at the Second Battle of Newtonia on October 28. After the defeat at Newtonia, Price's army began to fall to pieces, and was pursued by Curtis' army all the way to the Arkansas River. By December, the shattered remainder of Price's army reached Texas, with the campaign having ended in a decisive defeat. The defeat of Price's expedition marked the last major Confederate operation in the Trans-Mississippi Theater. Mine Creek gained the distinction of being one the largest battles between mounted cavalry in the war.

== Legacy ==
The site of the battle was listed on the National Register of Historic Places in 1973 as the Battle of Mine Creek Site. At the time of the listing, the site was considered to be in "good" condition, although the prairie has been converted into cultivated agricultural land, a pond has been constructed, and the number of trees on the site has increased. The Kansas Historical Society has also preserved the site as the Mine Creek Battlefield State Historic Site; the site was officially founded in 1974. Marked trails are present at the site, allowing visitors to view the significant features of the battlefield. A visitor center has also been constructed.

As of 2019, the American Battlefield Trust and its partners had acquired and preserved 326 acres (132 ha) of the battlefield.

On November 15, 2004, the History Channel released a documentary about the battle titled Mine Creek: The Lost Battle of the Civil War.

== See also ==
- List of American Civil War battles
- List of battles fought in Kansas
- Troop engagements of the American Civil War, 1864
