= Battle of Glasgow, Missouri =

1864 battle of the American Civil War

Battle of Glasgow
- Part of the American Civil War
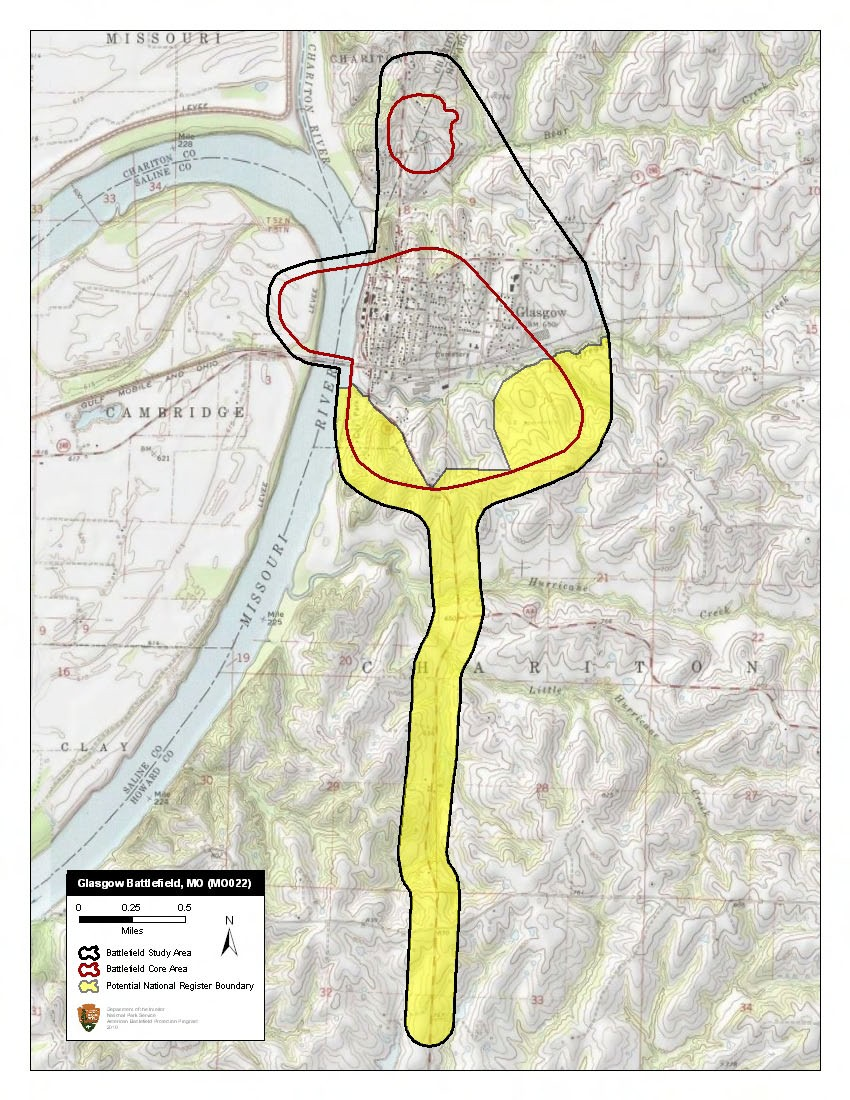
| Date | October 15, 1864 |
| Location | Glasgow, Missouri 39.2379°N 92.8422°W |
| Result | Confederate victory |

Belligerents
| (United States) Union | (Confederate States of America) Confederacy |

Commanders and leaders
| (United States) Chester Harding Jr. | (Confederate States of America) John Bullock Clark Jr. (Confederate States of America) Joseph O. Shelby |

Strength
| 550–800 | c. 1,825 |

The Battle of Glasgow was fought on October 15, 1864, in and near Glasgow, Missouri as part of Price's Missouri Expedition during the American Civil War. The battle resulted in the capture of needed weapons and improved Confederate morale, which had been dented after a defeat in the Battle of Pilot Knob.

In late 1864, the Confederate leadership in the Trans-Mississippi Theater planned a campaign into the state of Missouri, in the hope of drawing Union troops from more important theaters east of the Mississippi River. Major General Sterling Price commanded the expedition, and initially hoped to capture St. Louis. The early defeat at Pilot Knob led him to abandon this plan. After the strength of the Union garrison at Jefferson City convinced Price to cancel a planned attempt to capture the place, he led his army into the pro-Confederate region of Little Dixie, where recruiting efforts were successful. Many of these new recruits were unarmed.

Learning of a Union weapons cache at Glasgow, Price sent Brigadier General John B. Clark Jr. with two brigades on a side raid to capture it. The Union garrison of Glasgow was commanded by Colonel Chester Harding Jr., and was mostly composed of militia and men of the 43rd Missouri Infantry Regiment. At 05:00 on October 15, Confederate artillery opened fire on the Union position. After the Union commander rejected a surrender offer from Clark, the main attack began at about 08:00; it occurred late due to delays in reaching Glasgow. Harding's men were driven back into the town and burned 50,000 rations to prevent them from falling into Confederate hands. They surrendered at 13:30. Clark's men paroled the Union soldiers, captured 1,000 uniform overcoats and 1,200 weapons, and burned a steamboat. The Confederate column rejoined Price's main army the next day. On October 23, the Confederates were decisively defeated at the Battle of Westport. Price's men retreated, but were harried for much of the way by Union pursuit. The retreat eventually reached Texas.

== Context ==
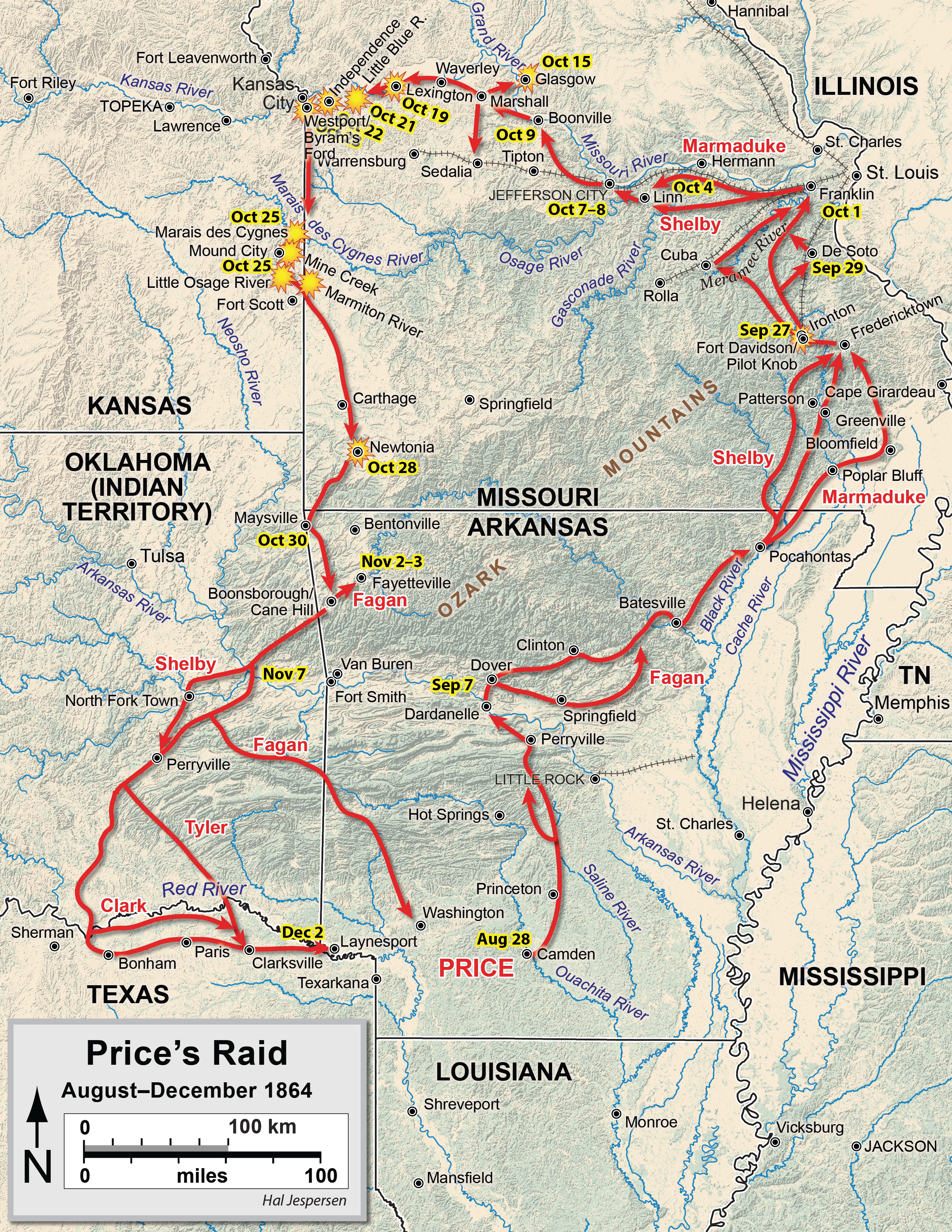
Map of Price's Missouri Expedition

At the start of the American Civil War in 1861, the state of Missouri was a slave state, but did not secede. The state was politically divided: Governor Claiborne Fox Jackson and the Missouri State Guard supported secession and the Confederate States of America, while Brigadier General Nathaniel Lyon and the Union Army supported the United States and opposed secession. Under Major General Sterling Price, the Missouri State Guard had some early success with battlefield victories at Wilson's Creek and Lexington, but by the end of the year, were restricted to the southwestern portion of the state. Meanwhile, Jackson and a portion of the state legislature voted to secede and join the Confederate States of America, but another element of the legislature voted to reject secession, essentially giving the state two governments. In March 1862, a Confederate defeat at the Battle of Pea Ridge in Arkansas gave the Union control of Missouri, and Confederate activity in the state was largely restricted to guerrilla warfare and raids throughout 1862 and 1863.

By September 1864, the Confederates had been defeated in the Atlanta campaign. This, and other events in the eastern United States, gave Abraham Lincoln, who supported continuing the war, an edge in the 1864 United States presidential election over George B. McClellan, who favored ending the war. Many Confederates thought that a McClellan electoral victory would lead to a peace that included Confederate independence. At this point, the Confederacy had very little chance of winning the war. As events east of the Mississippi River turned against the Confederates, General Edmund Kirby Smith, Confederate commander of the Trans-Mississippi Department, was ordered to transfer the infantry under his command to the fighting further east, but this was not possible due to the Union Navy's control of the Mississippi River.

Despite having limited resources for an offensive, Smith decided that an attack designed to divert Union troops from the principal theaters of combat would have an equivalent effect to the proposed transfer of troops. Price and the Confederate Governor of Missouri, Thomas Caute Reynolds, (Note: Jackson had died in early December 1862 of cancer; Reynolds replaced him in office on February 14, 1863.) suggested an invasion of Missouri; Smith approved the plan and appointed Price to command the offensive. Price expected that the offensive would achieve several objectives: create a popular uprising against Union control of Missouri; divert Union troops away from the principal theaters of combat; and aid McClellan's chance of defeating Lincoln in the election. On September 19, Price's column, named the Army of Missouri, entered the state.

== Prelude ==
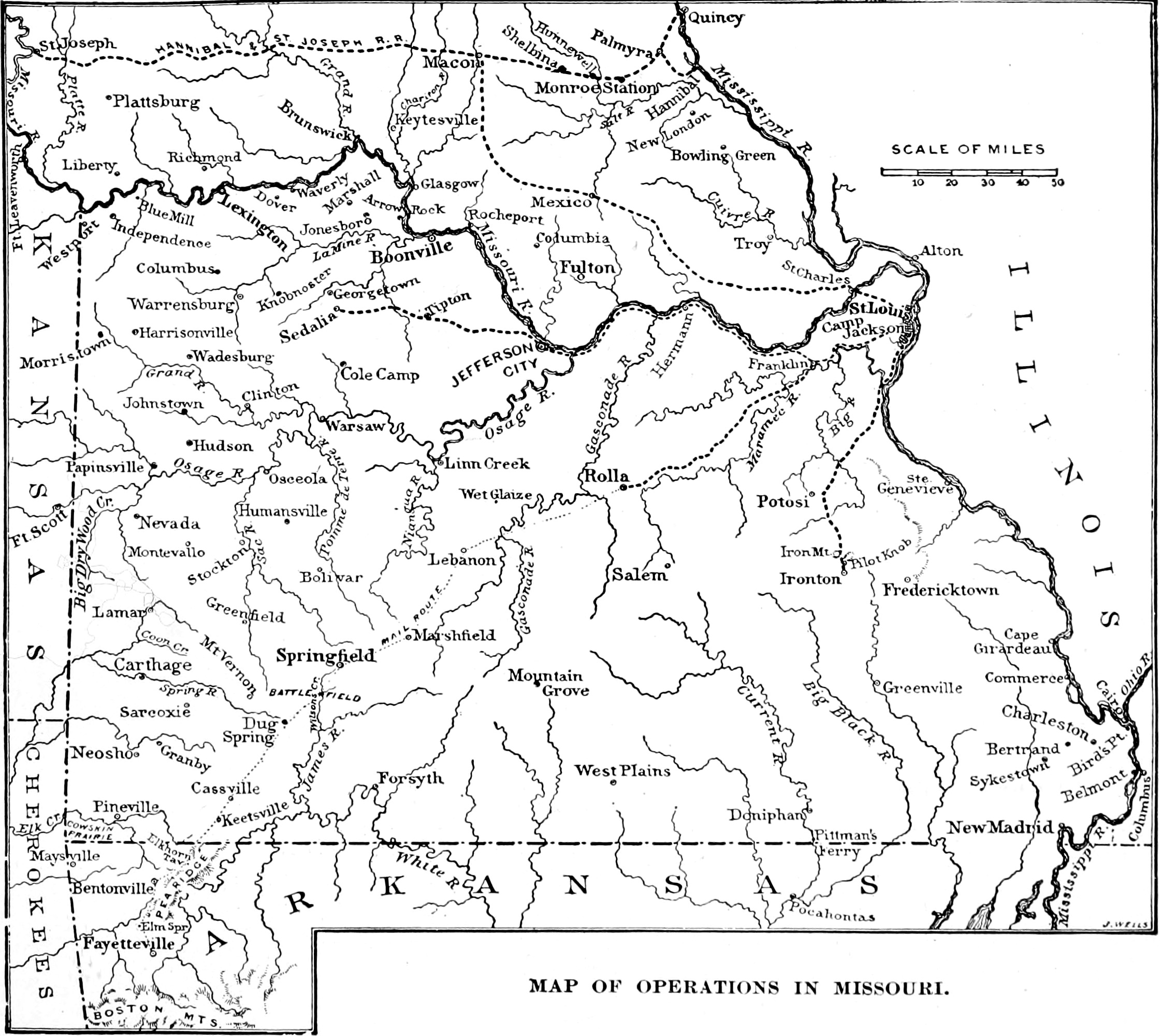
Map of key points in Missouri, including Pilot Knob, Boonville, and Glasgow

Price's force entered Missouri from the south with about 13,000 cavalrymen, beginning Price's Missouri Expedition. Several thousand of these men were poorly armed, and all 14 of the army's cannons were small, limiting their range and effectiveness. Opposing Price was Major General William S. Rosecrans, who commanded the Union Department of Missouri with fewer than 10,000 men on hand, many of whom were militiamen without experience in major battles. In late September, the Confederates encountered a small Union force holding Fort Davidson near the town of Pilot Knob. Confederate attacks against the post on September 27 failed, but the Union garrison abandoned the fort that night. Price suffered hundreds of casualties in the battle. Parts of the Confederate army advanced as far as Franklin, but then turned westwards to Jefferson City via Union and Washington.

Price had abandoned intentions to attack St. Louis due to the defeat at Pilot Knob and was not making a serious attempt to capture the city in the advance to Franklin. St. Louis had also been reinforced by a Union infantry force led by Major General A. J. Smith. Price's army was accompanied by a sizable wagon train, which significantly slowed its movement. The train was used to carry the supplies and forage collected by the Confederates from the towns they went through. Union forces had time to reinforce Jefferson City, whose garrison was increased from 1,000 men to 7,000 between October 1 and 6. The reinforcements were a mixture of regular troops drawn from elsewhere in the state and militia, including some of the Enrolled Missouri Militia who were called up on short notice. Price determined that Jefferson City was too strong to attack, and continued moving westwards along the course of the Missouri River.

The vanguard of Price's army reached Boonville on October 9. Boonville was part of a pro-Confederate area known as Little Dixie, and many men, including Bloody Bill Anderson and his guerrillas, joined the Confederates. Price detached Anderson to operate north of the main body to harass the North Missouri Railroad and attempted to get William C. Quantrill's guerrillas to attack the Hannibal and St. Joseph Railroad. (Note: While Anderson did burn two railroad depots, he largely ignored Price's orders, and instead followed the fringes of Prices' army, looting in the areas cleared of Union troops.) Union troops followed Price westwards; one body was to the east of Boonville at Rocheport, and another, under Brigadier General John B. Sanborn, was to the south at California. On the 11th, Sanborn moved north and skirmished with the Confederates, who abandoned Boonville the next day and continued west in the direction of Marshall.

The Confederates's recruiting in Little Dixie was successful. (Note: According to different sources, Price was able to recruit either around 1,200 or 2,500 men.) Although the new recruits added to the numerical strength of Price's army, many of them were unarmed. Late on October 12, Price learned of rumors that a substantial store of weapons was held by the Union garrison of Glasgow, across the Missouri River and 20 miles (32 km) north of Boonville. On October 14, Price authorized two raids for the purpose of capturing supplies. One, under Brigadier General (Note: Thompson's commission was in the Missouri State Guard, not the Confederate States Army.) M. Jeff Thompson, commander of Shelby's Iron Brigade, was sent 26 miles (42 km) south of Price's camp to Sedalia, which it captured on October 15. The second, led by Brigadier General John B. Clark Jr., was directed towards Glasgow.

== Battle ==
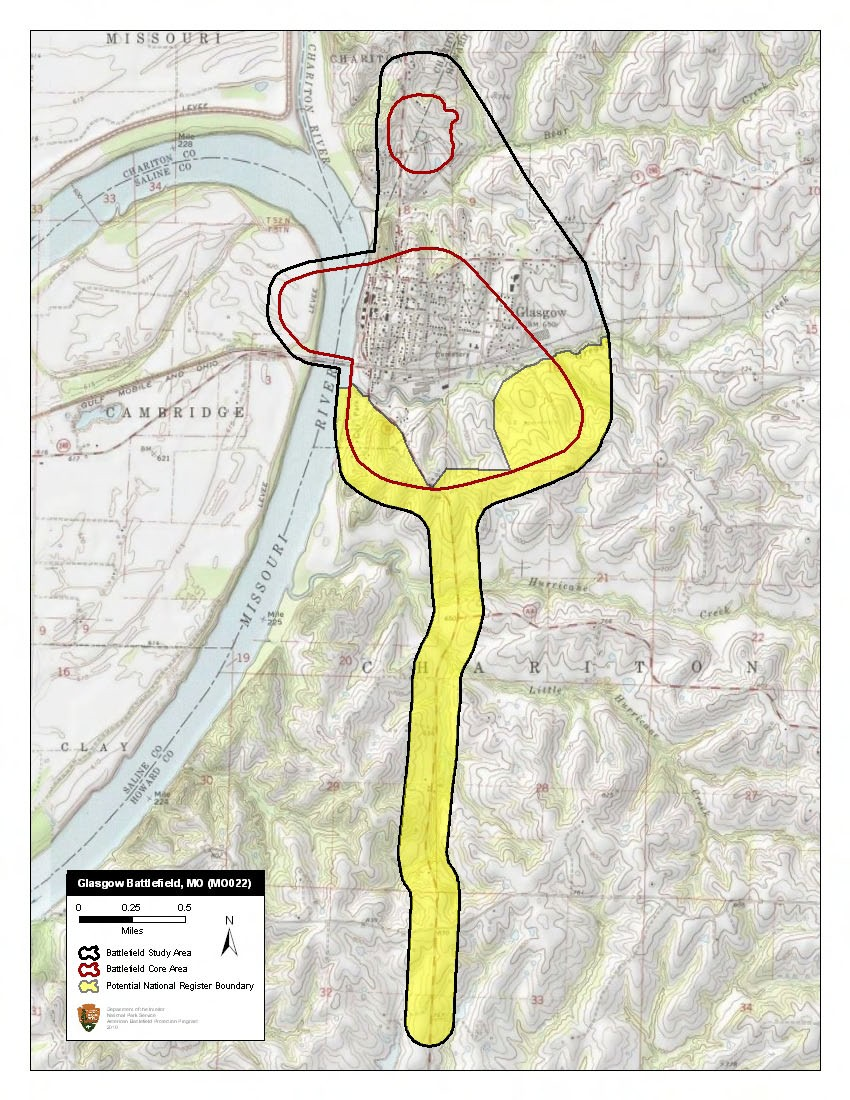
Map of Glasgow Battlefield core and study areas by the American Battlefield Protection Program

Clark's 1,700 or 1,800-man column consisted of his own brigade (under the command of Colonel Colton Greene), 500 men from Colonel Sidney D. Jackman's brigade, and Harris's Missouri Battery. Clark and Jackman were selected for the operation because they were local residents. The column pushed north and then crossed the Missouri by ferry at Arrow Rock on the 14th. After hearing rumors that the garrison of Glasgow had a "tin-clad boat", Clark asked Price for more artillery. In reality, the Union vessel present, the steamer West Wind, was not tin-clad or even armed. Since the river at Glasgow was narrow enough for artillery to effectively fire across it, Price sent Brigadier General Joseph O. Shelby with 125 cavalrymen and part of Collins's Missouri Battery to a point on the western bank of the Missouri opposite Glasgow. Shelby's force was joined by some of Anderson's guerrillas, but Anderson and his men did not participate in the fighting. The Union garrison was initially a small force under the command of Captain John E. Mayo, but it had been reinforced on October 13 by part of the 43rd Missouri Infantry Regiment under the command of Colonel Chester Harding. The Missouri infantrymen had been temporarily stranded when the steamboats they were on ran aground. Once the ships were freed, they went downriver to Glasgow, where they unloaded the Missourians and supplies. One of the ships, Benton, returned to Jefferson City, while the other, West Wind, stayed at Glasgow, as its draft was expected to be too deep for the falling water levels on the river.

Harding, who was now in command of the garrison at Glasgow, had between 550 and 800 men available, including armed civilians. The Union force had no artillery available. Glasgow's location on a hilltop provided an advantage to the defenders. The interior Union line was anchored by two unfinished fortifications which held about 40 men each. The defenses between the fortifications were makeshift, although they had been extended to the east to a schoolhouse. Most of Harding's men were positioned outside the fortified line where the roads entered town. This interior line ran from near the river to the east edge of town, before curving to the north. Elements of the 43rd Missouri Infantry held east and west positions south of town on the external line, near where the roads crossed Greggs Creek. In between those two positions, a line of local militiamen was posted. The two road crossings were over 1 mile (1.6 km) apart. The line south of town ran roughly east to west. North of the town, a group of cavalry, largely members of the Missouri State Militia, held a position north of Bear Creek, crossed by a single road. A militia force was sent east to repair telegraphic connections with Jefferson City, but returned to Glasgow late on October 14 after running into a Confederate force. At around 05:00 on October 15, Collins's Battery opened fire, aiming primarily for West Wind, visible campfires, and exposed streets in the town. This fire was largely ineffective, as was fire from the cavalry accompanying the cannons, although a prominent pro-Confederate civilian, clergyman William Goff Caples, was killed by an artillery shot. Union sharpshooters drove some Confederates away from the riverbank.

Clark's force, delayed an hour while trying to cross the Missouri River, arrived later than Shelby expected. Clark was three miles away when Collins opened fire. By about 07:00, Clark's men finally arrived on the field. Jackman's men were aligned to the left, closer to the river, with most of the rest of the Confederate force to Jackman's right. The 3rd Missouri Cavalry Regiment held the extreme Confederate right. The 10th Missouri Cavalry Regiment was sent around the Union rear to attack Glasgow from the north. Greene had one of Harris's cannons brought to the front. Harding responded by reinforcing the Greggs Creek line with several companies of the 43rd Missouri. Clark sent a surrender offer to Harding, using civilians to deliver the message. The Union commander was confused by the nonstandard use of civilian messengers, and rejected the offer.

Clarks' main body south of town forced its way across Greggs Creek beginning around 08:00, although the Union defenders put up a hardy fight. In his after-battle report, Harding stated that his men had been outflanked on both ends of their line. The Union troops fell back into the prepared position in Glasgow proper. They came under fire from the Confederate artillery on the opposite side of the river, which was more effective this time. West Wind had been damaged by artillery fire. Shelby ordered men across the river in a small boat to West Wind, hoping to take West Wind to use it as a ferry across the river. The Confederates reached West Wind but found the steamboat's engines had been rendered nonfunctional, and they had to return to Shelby. Meanwhile, the 10th Missouri Cavalry's drive from the north had been stymied by the Missouri State Militia force north of town.

Confederate troops closed in on the Union line in Glasgow. Clark described the distance between the two sides as "short"; Harding estimated the distance at 30 yards (27 m) to 50 yards (46 m). House-to-house fighting ensued. Harding conducted a council of war, which resulted in the decision to surrender. Before surrendering, Union troops burned 50,000 rations in Glasgow's City Hall to prevent them from falling into Confederate hands. The fire spread to other buildings, causing $130,000 in damage. Additional supplies were not burned because they were kept in positions near the river that were inaccessible. The surrender took place around 13:30, and its terms allowed captured Union officers to keep their horses and sidearms. Harding and his men were paroled and escorted to a Union position on the Lamine River. The escort was provided to protect them from guerrillas. A Confederate officer conducted a ceremony where the Union soldiers were sworn not to serve against the Confederates again, although this was not part of the agreed surrender terms.

== Aftermath ==
The Glasgow victory boosted the morale of Price's army, which had been dented after Pilot Knob. It resulted in the capture of 1,200 weapons, 1,000 Union uniform overcoats, and 150 horses. Quantrill and his men robbed a bank on October 16 and Anderson's men fatally beat a civilian on the night of October 21–22 in an attempt to get money, and then raped a former slave that he had freed. The Union garrison in Glasgow had previously prevented the guerrillas from raiding the place, but with Harding and his men gone, the town had become a guerrilla target. Some Confederate sources claimed as many as 1,000 Union soldiers were captured at Glasgow, and Union reports provide a figure of 550. The historian Mark A. Lause rejects the numbers reported by the Confederates and suggests the Union figure is too low due to not accurately counting militia strength, suggesting a more accurate figure would be about 650. Reports of Union wounded give a maximum number of 32 wounded and 8 to 11 killed, although Lause believes that this figure for wounded is improbably low, likely due to omitting militia losses, and states that about four dozen would be a better estimate. Clark's official report did not include casualty numbers, and several Confederate units did not report losses, although it is known that one regiment had seven men killed and 46 wounded. Preservationist Frances E. Kennedy places the number of paroled Union soldiers as over 600, not counting battle losses.

In the town of Glasgow, 15 homes and a church were damaged. Confederate soldiers burned West Wind on October 16 or 17. In 1921, the remains of West Wind were deemed a hazard to navigation and were removed by a snagboat. An engine removed from the riverbed at Glasgow during a World War II scrap drive was rumored to have come from the vessel.

Clark rejoined the Confederate army on October 16, and the combined force continued moving west towards Kansas City, where the Kansas State Militia and the Union Army of the Border were mustering. The Confederates continued to move west, fighting several small battles. On October 23, they were defeated at the Battle of Westport by Union Major General Samuel R. Curtis. Price's men began retreating, but suffered more defeats, including the disastrous Battle of Mine Creek where many men were captured. After one last action at the Second Battle of Newtonia on October 28, the Confederates retreated into Arkansas and then the Indian Territory; Union pursuit continued until the Arkansas River was reached on November 8. The Confederate retreat continued as far as Texas. The campaign cost Price more than two-thirds of his army.

Interpretive signage has been erected within Glasgow to commemorate the battle. Historical reenactments of the battle have been held, and a flag flown during the battle is displayed in the Lewis Library.

== Sources ==
- Collins, Charles D. Jr. (2016). Battlefield Atlas of Price's Missouri Expedition of 1864 (PDF). Fort Leavenworth, Kansas: Combat Studies Institute Press. ISBN 978-1-940804-27-9.
- Erwin, Vicki Berger; Erwin, James (2020). Steamboat Disasters of the Lower Missouri River. Charleston, South Carolina: The History Press. ISBN 978-1-46714-325-7.
- Gaines, W. Craig (2008). Encyclopedia of Civil War Shipwrecks. Baton Rouge, Louisiana: Louisiana State University Press. ISBN 978-0-8071-3274-6.
- Kennedy, Frances H., ed. (1998). The Civil War Battlefield Guide (2nd ed.). Boston/New York: Houghton Mifflin. ISBN 978-0-395-74012-5.
- Kirkman, Paul (2011). The Battle of Westport: Missouri's Great Confederate Raid. Charleston, South Carolina: The History Press. ISBN 978-1-60949-006-5.
- Lause, Mark A. (2016). The Collapse of Price's Raid: The Beginning of the End in Civil War Missouri. Columbia, Missouri: University of Missouri Press. ISBN 978-0-826-22025-7.
- McPherson, James M. (1988). Battle Cry of Freedom. Oxford: Oxford University Press. ISBN 0-19-503863-0.
- An Industrial History of Missouri, 1922, 1921, 1920. Jefferson City, Missouri: Missouri Bureau of Labor Statistics. 1923. OCLC 14260452.
- Monnett, Howard N. (1995) [1964]. Action Before Westport 1864 (Revised ed.). Boulder, Colorado: University Press of Colorado. ISBN 978-0-87081-413-6.
- Nichols, Bruce (2014). Guerrilla Warfare in Civil War Missouri. Vol. IV: September 1864–June 1865. Jefferson, North Carolina: McFarland & Company. ISBN 978-0-786-47584-1.
- Parrish, William Earl (2001) [1973]. A History of Missouri: 1860–1875. Columbia, Missouri: University of Missouri Press. ISBN 978-0-8262-1376-1.
- Sinisi, Kyle S. (2020) [2015]. The Last Hurrah: Sterling Price's Missouri Expedition of 1864 (paperback ed.). Lanham, Maryland: Rowman & Littlefield. ISBN 978-1-5381-4151-9.
- Suderow, Bryce A.; House, R. Scott (2014). The Battle of Pilot Knob: Thunder in Arcadia Valley. Cape Girardeau, Missouri: Southeast Missouri State University Press. ISBN 978-0-9903530-2-7.
- Warner, Ezra J. (1987) [1959]. Generals in Gray (Louisiana Paperback ed.). Baton Rouge, Louisiana: Louisiana State University Press. ISBN 978-0-8071-3150-3.
- Weeks, Michael (2009). The Complete Civil War Road Trip Guide. Woodstock, Vermont: The Countryman Press. ISBN 978-0-88150-860-4.
