= Battle of Marmiton River =

Battle of the American Civil War

Coordinates: 37.8717°N 94.6153°W

- Part of the American Civil War
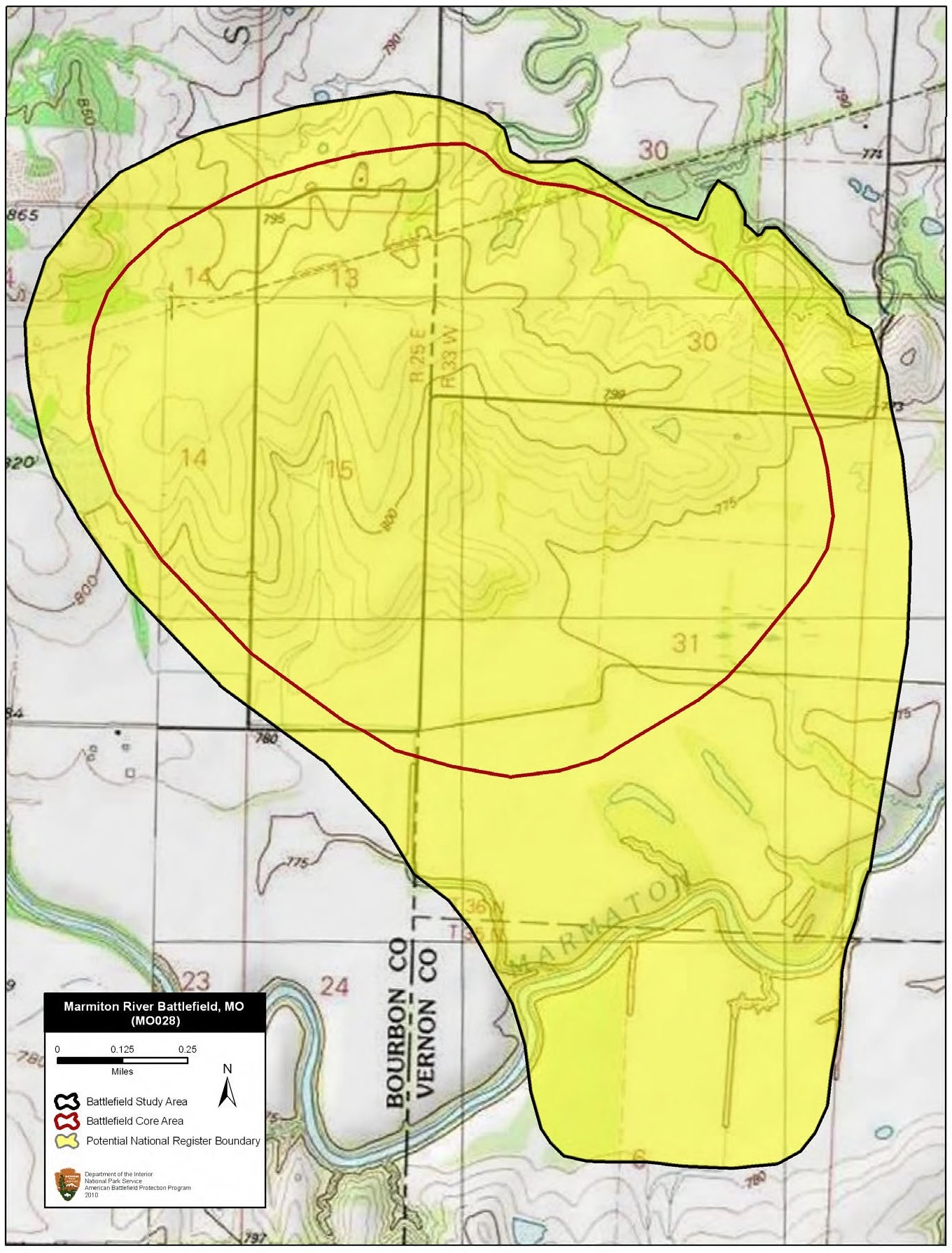
- Map of the battlefield
Date	October 25, 1864
Location	Vernon County, Missouri
Result	Union victory

Belligerents
Union	CSA

Commanders and leaders
John McNeil; Frederick W. Benteen	Sterling Price; Joseph O. Shelby

Units involved
Department of the Missouri	Army of Missouri

Strength
Two brigades (Note: Numerical strength unknown)	c. 1,000–4,000

Casualties and losses
Light	c. 75

The Battle of Marmiton River, also known as Shiloh Creek or Charlot's Farm, occurred on October 25, 1864, in Vernon County, Missouri during the American Civil War. Major General Sterling Price of the Confederate States Army commenced an expedition into Missouri in September 1864, with hopes of challenging Union control of the state. After a defeat at the Battle of Westport on October 23, Price began to retreat south, and suffered a serious defeat at the Battle of Mine Creek early on October 25. The afternoon of the 25th, Price's wagon train became stalled at the crossing of the Marmaton River in western Missouri. A delaying force led by Brigadier General Joseph O. Shelby attempted to hold off Union cavalry commanded by Brigadier General John McNeil and Lieutenant Colonel Frederick W. Benteen. Shelby was unable to drive off the Union force, although the fatigue of the Union cavalry's horses prevented close-quarters action. At nightfall, the Confederates disengaged and destroyed much of their wagon train. Price was again defeated on October 28 at the Second Battle of Newtonia, and the Confederate retreat continued until the survivors reached Texas in early December.

== Background ==
In early September 1864, during the American Civil War, Major General Sterling Price of the Confederate States Army began an invasion of Missouri with hopes of capturing St. Louis and regaining control of Missouri for the Confederacy. After being repulsed at the Battle of Pilot Knob in late September, Price's army changed course to aim for the Missouri River. The Union Army of the Border began pursuing Price's column, and defeated the Confederates at the Battle of Westport near Kansas City on October 23. Price's defeated army retreated southward, and suffered defeats at the battles of Marais des Cygnes and Mine Creek early on October 25. The loss at Mine Creek was particularly devastating, as a pile-up at the ford of Mine Creek led to the capture of many of Price's cannons and soldiers, including Brigadier Generals John S. Marmaduke and William L. Cabell. Brigadier General Joseph O. Shelby's division arrived in time to provide Price's column with a rear guard after Mine Creek. Shelby's men fought a delaying action against the pursuing Union soldiers at the crossing of the Little Osage River. Union cavalry would eventually brush aside the Confederates at the Little Osage River, but the defense had bought time for Price's retreat.

== Battle ==
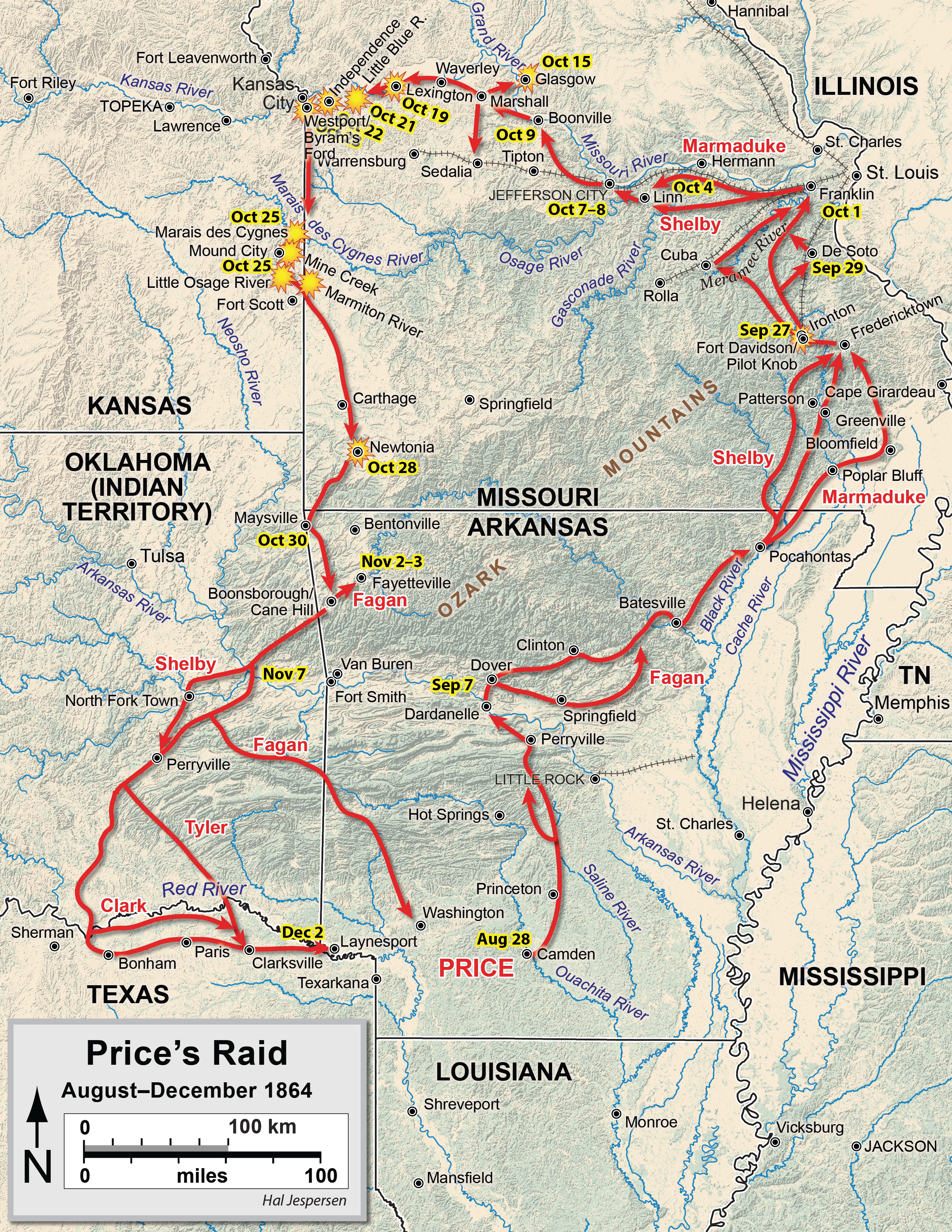
Map of Price's Raid

After crossing into western Missouri on the afternoon of the 25th, Price's wagon train became stalled at the crossing of the Marmaton River, much as it had at the Mine Creek crossing. Price formed a line to protect his wagon train from the Union soldiers. The front of the line consisted of militia officer M. Jeff Thompson's brigade of Shelby's division, some of the remains of Major General James F. Fagan and Marmaduke's (commanded by Brigadier General John B. Clark Jr. after Marmaduke's capture) divisions, which had been shattered at Mine Creek, and a portion of Colonel Charles H. Tyler's brigade. Some of the men in Tyler's brigade were unarmed. The rest of Fagan and Clark's divisions and Tyler's brigade were aligned in a second line. Colonel Sidney D. Jackman's brigade was held in reserve. While Price's men were estimated to number around 8,000, many of these men were either too demoralized or fatigued to fight, or were unarmed. Estimates of how many Confederates were in true fighting condition range from 1,000 to 4,000.

Union cavalry commanded by Brigadier General John McNeil and Lieutenant Colonel Frederick W. Benteen caught up to Price's makeshift line. After the arrival of the Union forces, Shelby ordered the portion of Tyler's brigade on the front line to charge, but this attack was quickly repulsed by McNeil's men. The Union forces then brought up artillery in the form of two sections of cannons. Shelby used several feints to try to hold off the Union forces, but these assaults were also driven off. A Union attempt to charge the Confederate line was delayed when it was discovered that the cavalry charge would block the line of fire of the Union artillery, requiring the Union artillery to change positions. Once the Union attack was restarted, the Union troopers discovered that their horses were too tired to move at a gallop. The Confederates still had three serviceable cannons remaining, but did not engage them in the fight, possibly due to a fear of the cannons being captured (most of the Confederate cannons had been captured at Mine Creek). While the Union cavalrymen were unable to reach the Confederate line because of the fatigue of their horses, some of the demoralized Confederates, especially in Thompson's brigade, began to retreat. Near dusk, Jackman's brigade was released from reserve, and charged the Union line. Jackman's charge was able to force the 4th Iowa Cavalry to withdraw. At nightfall, the Confederates withdrew, and the fighting ended.

== Aftermath ==
Exact Union losses are not known, but are reported to have been light. The Confederates lost about 75 men, with about a third of that total having been killed. That night, Price decided to destroy any wagons that were not essential. At this point, the Confederate army was so shattered that historian Albert E. Castel described the force as essentially an armed mob. By the end of October 26, Price's force had fallen back to Carthage, Missouri, where rations were handed out. Some of the Confederate soldiers had not received rations for six days. On October 28, Price was again defeated, this time at the Second Battle of Newtonia. The Confederates withdrew into Arkansas, and were pursued to the Arkansas River. Price continued to retreat, and what was left of his army reached Texas in early December.

== Preservation ==
The landscape at the battlefield is considered to be in good condition, although the landscape faces some threats from changes in land use. The Civil War Sites Advisory Commission (CWSAC) noted that the current land use at the site is similar to what it was in 1864. None of the site is currently protected, although the CWSAC determined that 1,488.12 acres (602.22 ha) of the site could potentially be added to the National Register of Historic Places. The site is part of the Freedom's Frontier National Heritage Area. Public interpretation features, but no visitor center, exist at the site.

== Sources ==
- Buresh, Lumir F. (1977). October 25 and the Battle of Mine Creek. Kansas City, Missouri: The Lowell Press. ISBN 0-913504-40-8.
- Castel, Albert (1993). General Sterling Price and the Civil War in the West (Louisiana Paperback ed.). Baton Rouge, Louisiana: Louisiana State University Press. ISBN 0-8071-1854-0.
- Collins, Charles D. Jr. (2016). Battlefield Atlas of Price's Missouri Expedition of 1864 (PDF). Fort Leavenworth, Kansas: Combat Studies Institute Press. ISBN 978-1-940804-27-9.
- Kennedy, Frances H., ed. (1998). The Civil War Battlefield Guide (2nd ed.). Boston/New York: Houghton Mifflin. ISBN 978-0-395-74012-5.
