= Colorado Territory in the American Civil War =

The Colorado Territory was formally created in 1861 shortly before the bombardment of Fort Sumter sparked the American Civil War. Although sentiments were somewhat divided in the early days of the war, Colorado was only marginally a pro-Union territory (four statehood attempts were thwarted, largely by Confederate sympathizers in July 1862, February 1863, February 1864, and January 1866). Colorado was strategically important to both the Union and Confederacy because of the gold and silver mines there as both sides wanted to use the mineral wealth to help finance the war. The New Mexico Campaign (February to April 1862) was a military operation conducted by Confederate Brigadier General Henry Sibley to gain control of the Southwest, including the gold fields of Colorado, the mineral-rich territory of Nevada and the ports of California. The campaign was intended as a prelude to an invasion of the Colorado Territory and an attempt to cut the supply lines between California and the rest of the Union. However, the Confederates were defeated at the Battle of Glorieta Pass in New Mexico and were forced to retreat back to Texas, effectively ending the New Mexico Campaign.

== Confederate sympathizers ==
During the late 1850s, many Southerners migrated to Colorado Territory in search of new opportunities, including working in the newly discovered gold fields. When the War broke out, many returned to the South to defend their homes. However, some remained and formed militia groups in Fairplay, Leadville, Denver and Mace's Hole (present day Beulah). These Confederate Partisan Ranger units operated in Colorado Territory from 1861 to 1865, raiding supply wagon trains, disrupting communications lines, recruiting volunteers, and skirmishing with Union troops. There were also pockets of strong support for the Confederacy in the mining areas and in the Arkansas River Valley, from Cañon City eastward to Lamar, and Cañon City southward to Trinidad.

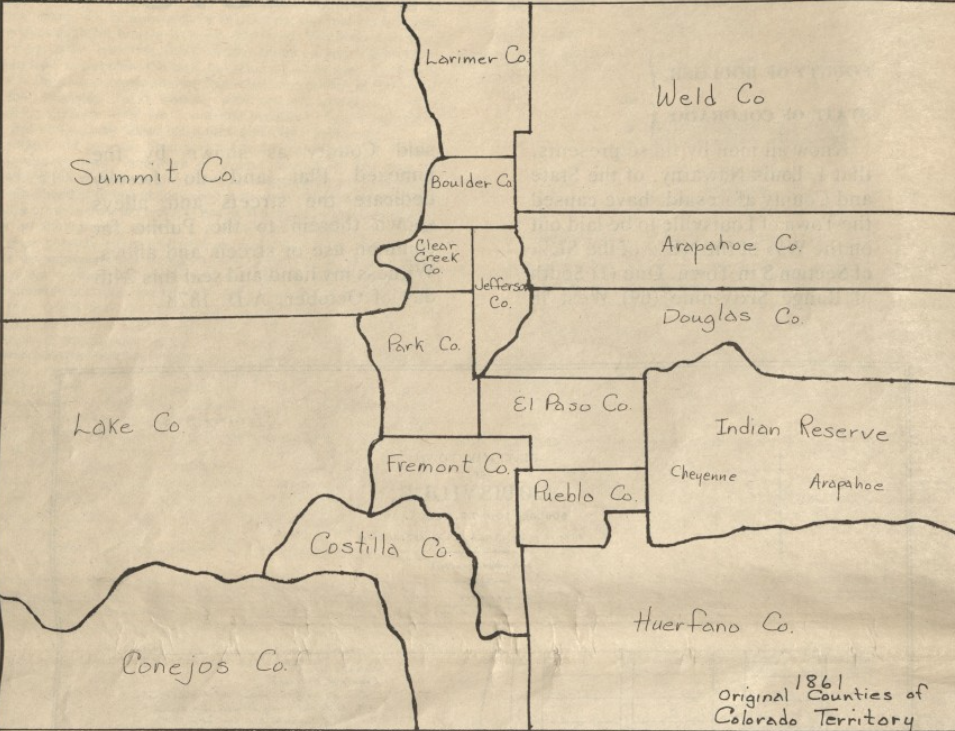
Map of the Colorado Territory, 1861

On January 3rd of 1861, the citizens of Bortonsburg (near modern day Central City) held a secession convention to vote if the town should secede from the union. It later passed with overwhelming support. The movement was led by a local US Marshall, who resigned his federal role to become sheriff. A group of secessionists organized two militia companies: one was dubbed the "hour-men" and the other was named "Limbers." The hour-men did not have any firearms, so they used local tree branches as clubs. The group then went to the courthouse and erected a flagpole and raised a flag bearing a Donkey's head. Later in the day a parade was held with a large barrel of whiskey displayed in the center of town. The parade was soon put on pause after reports of US troops were in the area. After there was no sign of the soldiers the parade continued throughout the town. Later a person from Missouri City got into an argument with one of the militiamen and drew a gun, which caused the sheriff to order his men to retreat. They soon realized the gun was not loaded so they marched back into town before quickly leaving again after another false report of troops in the area. Five days later a donkey from a local mining company was escorted by the hour-men into the center of town. Soon word spread of their actions and other towns in the area started seceding. On the January 5th or 6th a baker in the town of Enterprise (now Waterton) raised a palmetto flag to show support for the south. When the news of Bortonsburg's actions reached the townsfolk, a mob crowded around the baker's flagpole. They tore down the palmetto flag and raised a Donkey flag. On the 8th, a Central City judge blocked the secession ordinance, although the secessionist ignored the order and flew a unique Donkey flag with an "X" on its forehead. A day later the town Lump Gulch (near modern day Lump Gulch Highway) raised a Donkey flag. Three days later the people of Bortonsburg started to erect fortifications around town. They built some barricades and small forts between them and Missouri City. From each of the forts they flew the Donkey flag.

The first notable demonstration of opposition to the Union occurred in Denver on April 24, 1861, just a few days after the bombardment of Fort Sumter. Denver awakened to find the "Stars and Bars" had been raised over the Wallingford & Murphy store on Larimer Street. A turbulent pro-Union crowd soon gathered in front of the store and demanded the flag be taken down. The Southern adherents were equally determined the flag should stay. A young man in the crowd, Samuel M. Logan, later a captain in the First Colorado Volunteers, climbed to the roof of the store to remove the flag. There are conflicting reports as to what happened next; some say a compromise was reached and the flag was permitted to remain for one day, while others state the flag was removed.

A month later Lieutenant Gooding of Company H of the 2nd Regiment, Colorado Cavalry found a Confederate flag flying from a local store on Thomson Creek, near modern day Carbondale. He asked the owner to take it down so his company did not have to march under it. The owner agreed and took it down but days later when the soldiers passed thought the area again they spotted another rebel flag over his store. The flag had a field that was made up of a gunny sack with a red cross sewn on it. The soldiers took it down and started smashing up the building, with many reported as being drunk. The Lieutenant ordered the men to stop but when they ignored him, he assaulted two of them which restored order and the men soon left.

In 1861, when Confederate General Sibley organized his army to invade New Mexico, he commissioned Captain George Madison to go into Colorado with a twofold mission: disrupt federal mail and communication lines, and to help organize Confederate recruitment there. At this time, Confederate recruits in Colorado were sent to a camp in the Pikes Peak area, and then sent to the main Confederate encampment at Mace's Hole. In early 1862, Captain Madison and his men captured mail en route to Ft. Garland. Madison was also actively planning a raid on Ft. Garland. Federal soldiers learned of the encampment at Mace's Hole and broke it up while many of the Confederates were away. The Federals captured forty-four Confederates and took them to Denver.

The "Reynolds Gang", a group of Southern sympathizers, operated in South Park in 1864. Their objective was to rob the gold mines in the area to help finance the Confederate government. However, their goal was never accomplished and the members were eventually captured. While the captured Southern sympathizers were being taken to Fort Lyon, the first stop on their way to Denver for a military trial, they attempted their escape. A gunfight ensued and three of the prisoners were killed. Two managed to steal horses in the confusion and escaped to New Mexico Territory.

== Other Colorado Confederate ties ==
Colorado was the only non-Southern state to have two ex-Confederate Soldiers elected as state governors:

- James B. Grant (Private, Company B, 20th Alabama Light Artillery Battalion, Confederate States of America) served as the 3rd Governor of Colorado from 1883 to 1885.
- Charles S. Thomas (Private, Georgia State Militia, Confederate States of America) served as the 11th Governor of Colorado from 1899 to 1901 and as a U.S. Senator from 1913 to 1921.
- Margaret Howell Davis Hayes, Confederate States of America President Jefferson Davis' daughter, and her husband, Joel Addison Hayes moved to Colorado Springs in 1885. As her husband rose in city banking circles, Margaret became involved with charitable causes and was a leading member of local society. After her death in 1909, Addison and the children took her ashes to Richmond to be interred with the Davis family at Hollywood Cemetery.

Colorado is also the only non-Southern State to host a national convention of surviving Confederate Veterans. The national organization of the United Confederate Veterans (active from 1890 to 1951) held their 49th Reunion in Trinidad, Colorado from August 22–25, 1939.

== Union regiments ==
When President Abraham Lincoln called for volunteer soldiers to supplement the Regular Army, Colorado residents responded, with nearly 4,000 men eventually enlisting in the volunteer Union forces authorized by the United States War Department. Hundreds more served in militia companies, authorized by the territorial governor, most of which were formed to fight Indians rather than Confederates. Three regiments of infantry were organized, which were reorganized as two regiments of cavalry, while a third regiment of cavalry was raised in 1864. Other residents enlisted in New Mexico units.

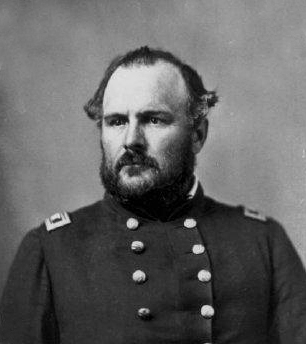
John Chivington, commander of the 3rd Colorado Cavalry at the Sand Creek Massacre.

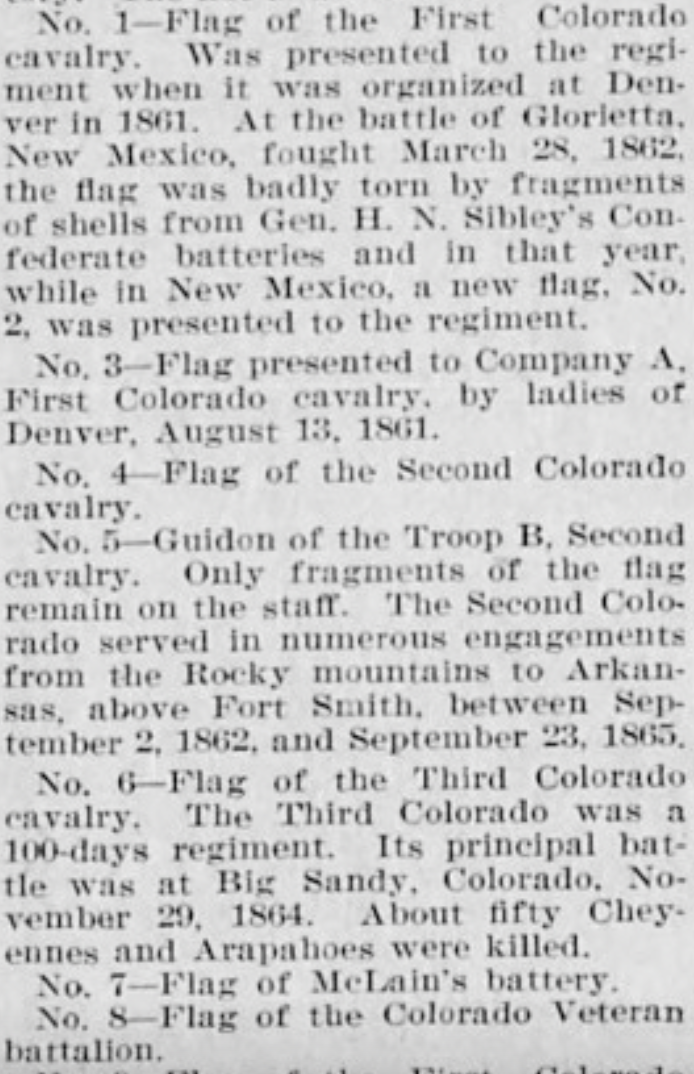
List of Colorado regimental flags stored in the state capitol, 1902

The territory's first governor, William Gilpin, organized the 1st Colorado Infantry in August 1861. The soldiers were paid $15 per month ($537 inflation adjusted) and mostly consisted of former prospectors. Nicknamed "Gilpin's Pet Lambs" because of the governor's involvement in their organization, the regiment and its first commander, John P. Slough, marched to northern New Mexico Territory in February–March 1862. There they fought in the battles of Apache Canyon, Glorieta Pass and Peralta. Slough resigned in April 1862 and was replaced by Major John M. Chivington.

A second regiment, the 2nd Colorado Infantry, was organized in February 1862, with four existing companies of independent militia joining the volunteer service and forming the nucleus of the new regiment, which primarily fought Indians during its existence, although battalions from the regiment fought at the Battle of Honey Springs in present-day Oklahoma. Much of the regiment was later consolidated with the 3rd Colorado Infantry Regiment and reformed into the 2nd Colorado Cavalry. (The 1st Colorado Cavalry had been organized in November 1862.) In January 1864, the 2nd Colorado Cavalry was ordered to the Missouri border counties to relieve Kansas troops defending against Confederate Partisan Units. Beginning in late April 1864, the regiment fought several skirmishes with Confederate Partisans throughout the summer months, as well as a raid on regular Confederate cavalry at the Battle of Camden Point, while John Evans, the new governor of Colorado Territory, pleaded for their return to Colorado. Just as the 2nd Colorado prepared to return for Indian-fighting duty in Colorado, Confederate General Sterling Price began his campaign to secure Missouri for the Confederacy. The 2nd Colorado was attached to the Union force raised to repel General Price's Missouri State Guards, and took part in the battles of the Little Blue River, Westport, Marais des Cygnes, and Mine Creek in October 1864. When Price withdrew, the 2nd Colorado was part of the pursuit, meeting him for the last time near Fayetteville, Arkansas, in November 1864.

The 3rd Colorado Cavalry Regiment, a hundred days regiment raised in August 1864, was involved in a series of bloody attacks on local Indians, including the notorious Sand Creek Massacre against a village of peaceful Cheyennes. The commander of the regiment, Colonel John Chivington, was accused of perpetrating a massacre but many in the territory, including the territorial legislature, came to his defense and consequently Chivington was never court–martialed.
