= McLain's Independent Light Artillery Battery (Colorado) =

McLain's Independent Battery Colorado Light Artillery
- Active: December 15, 1862 to August 31, 1865
- Country: United States
- Allegiance: Union
- Branch: Artillery
- Engagements: Battle of Little Blue River; Battle of Byram's Ford; Battle of Westport; Battle of Marais des Cygnes; Battle of Mine Creek; Battle of Marmiton River; Second Battle of Newtonia

McLain's Independent Battery Colorado Light Artillery was an artillery battery that served in the Union Army during the American Civil War. It was sometimes misspelled as "McLane's Battery".

== Service ==
The battery was organized at Denver, Colorado Territory, on December 15, 1862, and mustered in under the command of Captain William D. McLain.

The battery was attached to the District of Colorado to July 1864. District of Upper Arkansas to December 1864. District of South Kansas to April 1865. District of North Kansas to August 1865.

McLain's Independent Battery Colorado Light Artillery mustered out of service on August 31, 1865.

== Detailed service ==
Duty at Fort Lyon, Colorado Territory, operating against Indians, December 1862 to July 1863. At Camp Weld until December 1863. Scout from Fort Garland, Colorado Territory, October 12–16, 1863. At Denver December 1863 to June 1864. Expedition from Denver to Republican River, Kansas, April 8–23, 1864. Action at Big Bushes, Smoky Hill, Kansas, April 16. Ordered to District of Kansas June 1864. At Fort Larned, District of South Kansas, until August 1864. (A detachment was at Lawrence, Kansas.) Ordered to Lawrence August 9, and duty in District of Upper Arkansas. Stationed at Paola, Kansas until October. Operations against Price's Invasion October-November. Actions at Little Blue October 21. Big Blue October 22. Westport October 23. Pursuit of Price October 24-December 2. Mine Creek, Marias Des Cygnes, Charlot, October 25. Newtonia October 28. Cane Hill, November 6. At Paola until May 1865. Ordered to Fort Scott and Fort Gibson, and duty in District of North Kansas until August.

== Commanders ==
- Captain William D. McLain

== See also ==
- List of Colorado Civil War units
- Colorado in the Civil War
