= 2nd Colorado Infantry Regiment =

Former American military unit

- Active: February 1862 - October 1863
- Disbanded: October 1863
- Country: USA
- Allegiance: Colorado
- Branch: United States Army
- Type: Infantry
- Engagements: American Civil War; Battle of Valverde (Co.B); Battle of Glorieta Pass; Battle of Albuquerque; Battle of Cabin Creek; Battle of Honey Springs

Commanders
- Commander: Colonel Jesse Henry Leavenworth

The 2nd Colorado Infantry Regiment was an infantry regiment during the American Civil War from the state of Colorado. On October 13, 1863, the 2nd Colorado Infantry was consolidated with the 3rd Colorado Infantry Regiment in order to create the 2nd Colorado Cavalry Regiment.

== History ==
=== Prior to official formation ===
On August 29, 1861, James Hobart Ford was authorized by Governor William Gilpin to organize volunteers as a company of infantry. Theodore H. Dodd was appointed command of a second company of volunteers by Governor Gilpin on August 30. Both companies were raised and initially drilled in Cañon City, but by mid-December, both companies had marched to Fort Garland in the San Luis Valley.

== See also ==
- List of Colorado Territory Civil War units
- Denver City Home Guard
