= 3rd Colorado Infantry Regiment =

Former American military unit

- Active: September 1862-October 1863
- Disbanded: October 1863
- Country: United States
- Allegiance: Colorado
- Branch: United States Army
- Type: Infantry
- Patron: William Larimer

Commanders
- Commander: James Hobart Ford

The 3rd Colorado Infantry Regiment was an infantry regiment during the American Civil War from the state of Colorado. In October 1863, the 3rd Colorado Infantry was consolidated with the 2nd Colorado Infantry Regiment and the subsequent formation was re-designated as the 2nd Colorado Cavalry Regiment.

== Formation ==
In the fall of 1862, Governor John Evans began organizing the 3rd Colorado Infantry Regiment. Starting in September companies were organized under direction of the regiment's first commander Colonel William Larimer, and his deputy, Lieutenant Colonel Samuel S. Curtis. The regiment was garrisoned at Camp Weld during its training. During the regiment's formation, there was an understanding that Col. Larimer's command was temporary as the regiment's command was intended for James H. Ford, who was serving with 2nd Colorado Infantry Regiment. However there was fierce competition for recruits in Colorado Territory and Col. Larimer was only able to raise five companies and portions of sixth. In December, Col. Larimer resigned his position in the regiment.

On February 1 of 1862 a flag was presented by the group of ladies from Montgomery City, California to the soldiers of Company A. It was made by the women, and was similar to the American flag but with a unique canton. It bore an eagle surrounded by 34 stars with the inscription: "Presented to Company A, Third Regiment Colorado Volunteers." Below the canton on the white stripe were the words: "Victory, or a Free man's Grave." The flag was carried by private O. V. Wallace.

== Operations ==
On March 5, 1863, the 3rd Colorado Infantry Regiment departed Camp Weld and marched to Fort Leavenworth, Kansas.

== See also ==
- List of Colorado Territory Civil War units
