= Battle of Camden (disambiguation) =

The Battle of Camden was a major battle in 1780 during the American Revolutionary War

Battle of Camden may also refer to:

- Battle of Hobkirk's Hill, or the Second Battle of Camden, a minor battle in 1781
- Battle of South Mills, also known as the Battle of Camden, in 1862

== See also ==
- Battle of Camden Point, near Camden Point, Missouri, in 1864
- Camden Expedition, a campaign in 1864 that included Union occupation of Camden, Arkansas
