= Montgomery City =

Montgomery City may refer to:

- Montgomery City, California
- Montgomery City, Missouri
- Montgomery, Alabama
