= William Larimer Jr. =

American businessman, militia general, and politician (1809–1875)

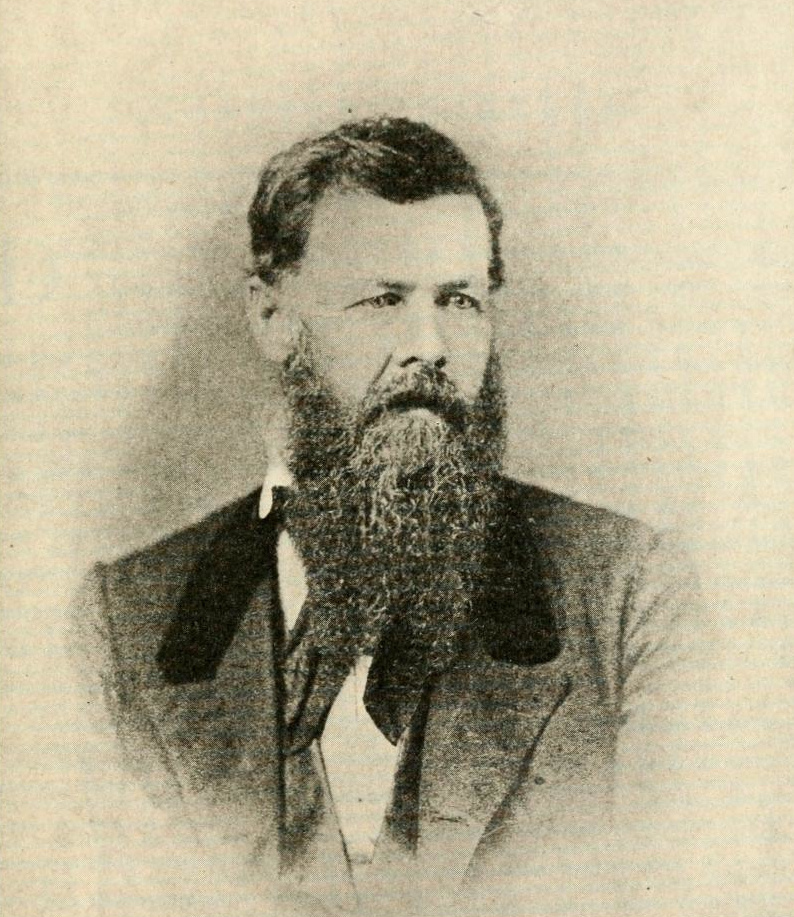
- Born: October 24, 1809; Circleville, Pennsylvania, U.S.
- Died: May 16, 1875 (aged 65); Leavenworth, Kansas, U.S.
- Resting place: Allegheny Cemetery, Pittsburgh
- Occupations: Businessman, investor, militia general, politician
- Spouse: Rachel McMasters
- Children: John; William; Edwin; Thomas; Aiden; Joseph; George; Annie Larimer Jones; Rachel Larimer Mellon
- Parent(s): William Larimer Sr., Anne Larimer

William Larimer Jr. (October 24, 1809 – May 16, 1875) was an American businessman, investor, militia general, and politician who is best known as the founder of Denver, Colorado, in 1858. Larimer often went by "General Larimer", having acquired the title in the Pennsylvania Militia.

== Biography ==
Larimer was born in Westmoreland County, Pennsylvania, and made his first fortune in the railroad industry in Pittsburgh. He became a land speculator in the 1850s in the Kansas Territory, founding a homestead in Leavenworth where he lived with his wife and nine children. In 1858, Larimer helped found the Denver City Land Company with the intention of creating a new city in the western part of the territory.

On November 22, 1858, Larimer arrived at a hill overlooking the confluence of Cherry Creek and the South Platte River. The site was across Cherry Creek from the existing settlement of Auraria, founded by William Greenburry Russell who is credited with starting the Pike's Peak Gold Rush. Larimer staked his claim by laying cottonwood logs along a square-mile parcel of land on the hill. Larimer chose the name "Denver City" to honor the governor of the Kansas Territory, James W. Denver, with the intention that the city would become the county seat of Arapaho County. In a letter dated February 1859, he had declared that "I am Denver City."

Larimer planned the site and aggressively sold tracts to miners and other migrants traveling through the Rocky Mountains. In the first years, tracts were often traded for grubstakes and in gambling. In 1860, all of the stockholders of Denver City merged with their rivals in Auraria, forming one city under the name Denver. Larimer was instrumental in the formation of the Colorado Territory in 1861, and in making Denver its capital. He anticipated being named the first governor of the territory, but was disappointed when Abraham Lincoln gave the appointment to William Gilpin of Missouri, in part as a favor to the governor of the state. After this unexpected turn of events, Larimer became a United States commissioner and a judge of probate for the First Judicial District of Colorado. During the Civil War, he became a colonel for the Third Regiment of Colorado Volunteers, and after returned to Kansas.

After serving as a Kansas state senator from 1867 until 1870, Larimer retired to his family farm in Leavenworth, Kansas, where he died in 1875. He is commemorated in the city he helped found by Larimer Street in downtown, as well as Larimer Square. He is also commemorated by Larimer County, Colorado, in the northern part of the state, and by the Larimer neighborhood in Pittsburgh.

== Bibliography ==
- Boorstin, Daniel (1965). The Americans: The National Experience. Vintage Books. ISBN 0394703588.
- Boucher, John Newton, ed. (1908). A Century and a Half of Pittsburg and Her People. Vol. 2. Lewis Publishing Company. hdl:2027/uva.x000953891.
- Jordan, John Woolf (1913). Genealogical and Personal History of the Allegheny Valley, Pennsylvania. Lewis Historical Publishing Company.
- Mellon, Rachel H. L. (1903). The Larimer, McMasters and Allied Families. Philadelphia, Printed for private circulation by J.B. Lippincott company.
