= 2nd Colorado Cavalry Regiment =

2nd Regiment Colorado Cavalry
- Active: October 1863 – September 23, 1865
- Disbanded: September 23, 1865
- Country: United States
- Allegiance: Union
- Branch: Cavalry
- Engagements: American Civil War: Battle of Camden Point; Second Battle of Lexington; Battle of Little Blue River; Second Battle of Independence; Battle of Byram's Ford; Battle of Westport; Battle of Marais des Cygnes; Battle of Mine Creek; Second Battle of Newtonia

Commanders
- Current commander: Colonel James Hobart Ford

The 2nd Regiment Colorado Cavalry was a cavalry regiment that served in the Union Army during the American Civil War.

== Service ==
The 2nd Colorado Cavalry was organized at St. Louis, Missouri, by consolidation of the 2nd Colorado Infantry and 3rd Colorado Infantry to date from October 1863 under the command of Colonel James Hobart Ford.

The regiment was attached to District of Southeast Missouri, Department of Missouri, to December 1863. District of St. Louis, Missouri, Department of Missouri, to January 1864. District of Central Missouri, Department of the Missouri, to December 1864. District of the Upper Arkansas to September 1865.

The 2nd Colorado Cavalry mustered out of service at Fort Leavenworth, Kansas, on September 23, 1865.

== Detailed service ==
The regiment was organized at Benton Barracks, Missouri, until January 1863. Since January 1863, Companies F, G, H, and K were on duty in the Colorado Territory at Fort Lyon and other areas until November 26, 1863.

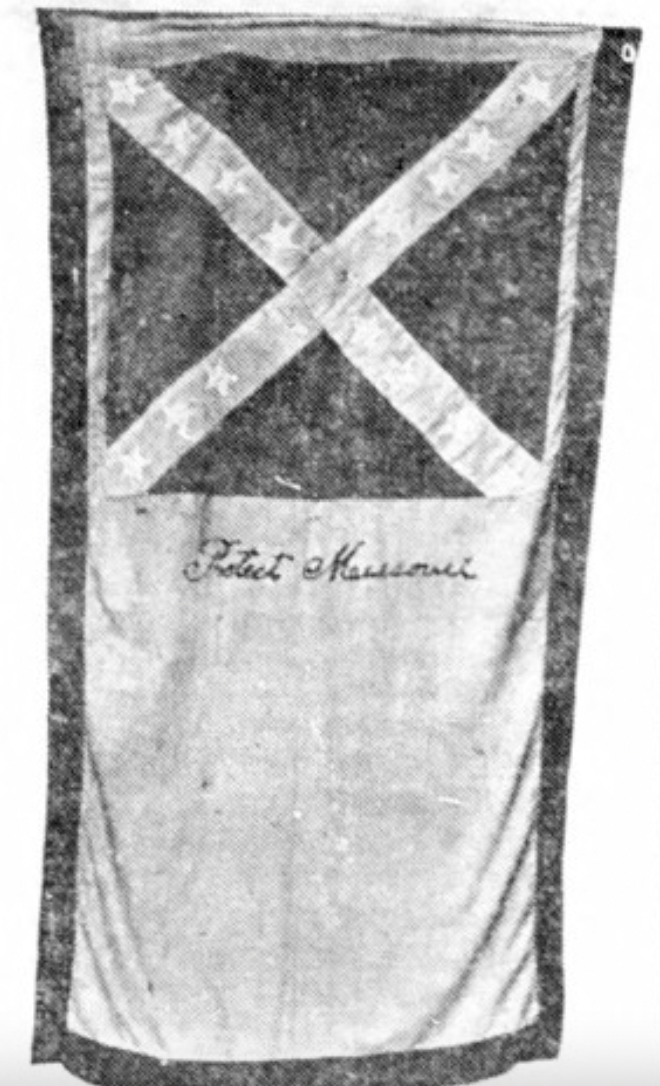
Rebel flag captured by Company F from Missouri guerrillas at the Battle of Camden Point. It bears the Motto: "Protect Missouri."

From Fort Lyon they stayed at Fort Riley, Kansas, between November 26 and December 25, 1863. They marched to Kansas City, Missouri, reaching Kansas City on January 6, 1864. They went through Kansas City to Dresden January 16, 1864. After staying at Dresden from February 15 to 20 they marched back to Kansas City.

Assigned to duty in 4th Sub-District of Central Missouri, consisting of Cass, Johnston, Bates and Vernon Counties, Mo., and engaged in protecting borders of Kansas and operations against guerrillas, with almost constant fighting by detachments, until October 1864.

- The Battle of Camden Point took place on July 13, 1864, near Camden Point, Missouri, USA
- Operating from Kansas City, Independence, Westport, Hickman's Mills, Pleasant Hill and Harrisonville.
- Skirmish at Dayton, Mo., April 27.
- Skirmishes in Johnson County April 28–30.
- Skirmish at Sin Hills April 29 and May 21.
- Affair at Blue River May 21 (detachment).
- Pleasant Hill May 28.
- Scout on the Osage June 8–19 (Companies I and L).
- Scout from Pleasant Hill June 14–16 (Companies D, I, K, and M).
- Expedition from Kansas City into Missouri June 18–20 (Companies I, K, and M).
- Operations in western Missouri July 6–30.
- Near the Little Blue, Jackson County, July 6 (Company C).
- Camden Point July 13.
- Near Fredericksburg July 14.
- Fayette Road, near Helmsville, July 16.
- Fredericksburg July 17.
- Scout on South Platte River, Colo. July 17–28 (detachment).
- Ragtown July 20.
- Camden Point July 22.
- Union Mills July 22.
- Pleasant Hill July 25.
- Near Independence August 1 (detachment).
- Scout on Independence Road to Gunter's Mills August 1–3 (Companies F, G, I, K, and L).
- Scout from Independence to Lafayette County August 2–8 (detachment).
- Scout from Independence to Lafayette and Jackson Counties August 13–18 (Companies C, D, F, I, K, and M).
- Operations in Lafayette, Howard and Saline Counties August 13–22.
- Engagement, Canadian River, Indian Territory, August 21 (detachment).
- Scouts in Jackson and Cass Counties August 25–29 (Company D).
- Skirmish near Pleasant Hill August 26 (Company D).
- Operations against Price's Invasion August 29-December 2.
- Scouts on Little Blue, Jackson County, September 2–10 (Company A).
- Walnut Creek September 25.
- Skirmish near Pleasant Hill September 26.
- Regiment concentrated at Pleasant Hill October 1, and cover Independence and front of the Army of the Border.
- Near Lexington October 17 (Companies C, E, G, K, and L).
- Lexington October 19.
- Battle of Little Blue October 21.
- Pursuit of Price October 21–28.
- Independence and State Line October 22.
- Big Blue and Westport October 23.
- Marias Des Cygnes, Mine Creek, Little Osage River, October 25.
- Newtonia October 28.
- Moved to District of the Upper Arkansas December 22, and engaged in operations against Indians about Fort Riley, Fort Zarah, Fort Ellsworth and Fort Larned until September 1865.
- Skirmish at Godfrey's Ranch, Colorado Territory, January 14, 1865 (detachment).
- Operations on Overland Stage Route from Denver to Julesburg, Colorado Territory, January 14–25 (detachment).
- Skirmish at Fort Zarah February 1 (Company C).
- Scout from Fort Larned to Crooked Creek March 9 (detachment).
- Near Fort Zarah April 23 (detachment).
- Pawnee Rock May 20 (detachment).
- Cow Creek Station, Plum Butte and Pawnee Rock June 12 (detachments).

== Commanders ==
- Colonel James Hobart Ford
- Major J. H. Pritchard - commanded at the Battle of Westport and Battle of Mine Creek
- Major J. Nelson Smith - commanded at the Battle of Westport; killed in action

== Notable members ==
- Captain Charles Frederick Holly, Company H - notable Colorado Territorial Legislator 1861–1862, Colorado Territorial Supreme Court Justice 1865–1866
- Private John "Liver-Eating" Johnson, Company H - notable mountain man

== See also ==
- List of Colorado Civil War units
- Colorado in the Civil War
