= List of Colorado Territory units in the American Civil War =

Coordinates: 38.9972°N 105.5478°W

Flag of the United States of America 1861-1863

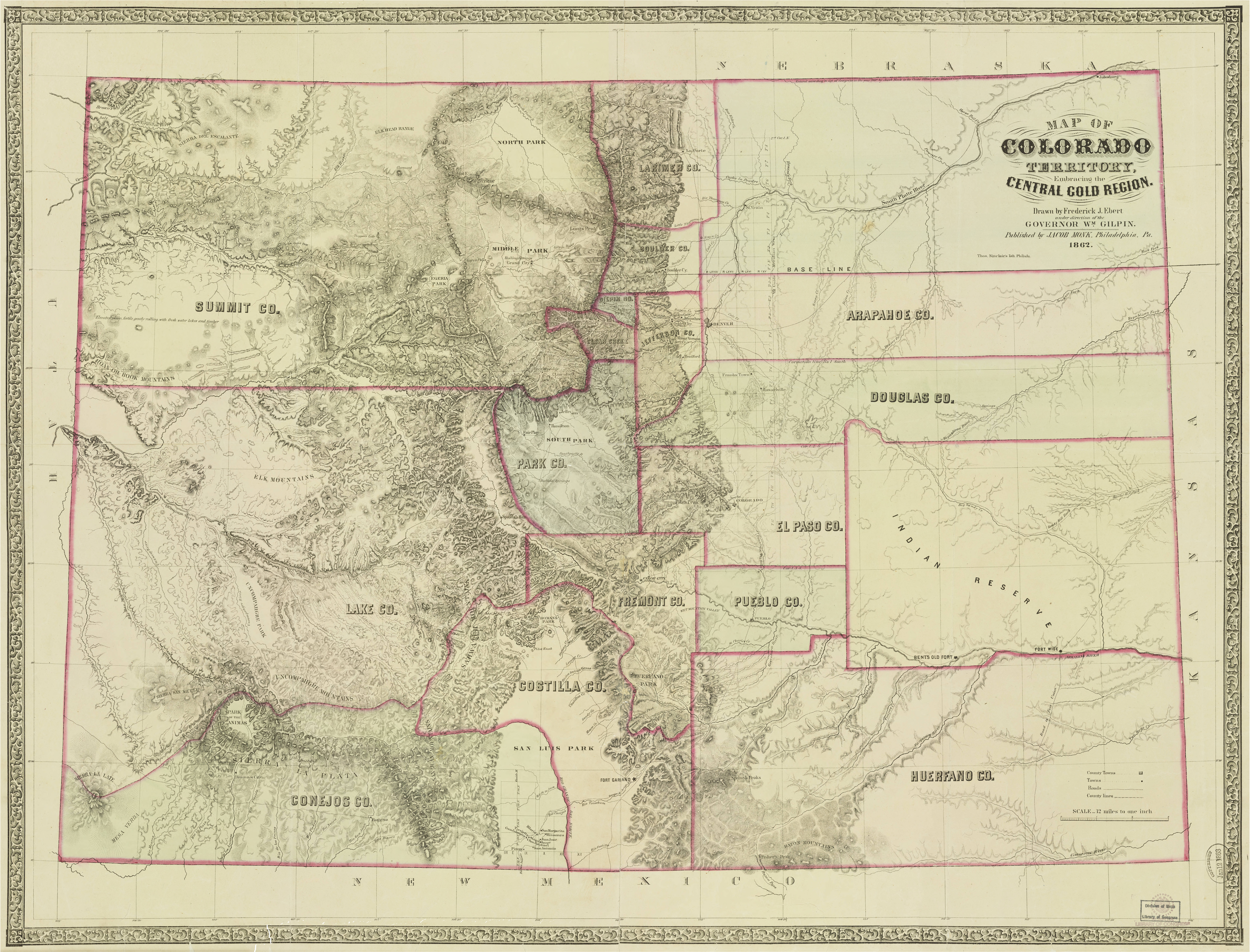
An 1862 map of the Territory of Colorado.

This is a list of military units from the U.S. Territory of Colorado engaged in the American Civil War.

On April 12, 1861, South Carolina artillery opened fire on Fort Sumter to start the American Civil War. While many gold seekers in the Colorado Territory held sympathies for the Confederacy, the vast majority remained fiercely loyal to the Union cause. An infantry, two cavalry regiments, and an artillery battery were sent to the support Union operations, while others were raised for internal defense.

In 1862, a force of Texas cavalry invaded the Territory of New Mexico and captured Santa Fe on March 10. The object of this Western Campaign was to seize or disrupt the gold fields of Colorado and California and to seize ports on the Pacific Ocean for the Confederacy. A hastily organized force of Colorado volunteers force-marched from Denver City, Colorado Territory, to Glorieta Pass, New Mexico Territory, in an attempt to block the Texans. On March 28, the Coloradans and local New Mexico volunteers stopped the Texans at the Battle of Glorieta Pass, destroyed their cannon and supply wagons, and ran off 500 of their horses and mules. The Texans were forced to retreat to Santa Fe. Having lost the supplies for their campaign and finding little support in New Mexico, the Texans abandoned Santa Fe and returned to San Antonio in defeat. The Confederacy made no further attempts to seize the Southwestern United States.

== Units ==
COLORADO	NOTES
1st Colorado Cavalry Regiment	November 1, 1862 – November 18, 1865.
2nd Colorado Cavalry Regiment	October 1863 – September 23, 1865.
3rd Colorado Cavalry Regiment	September 31, 1864 – December 31, 1864.
McLain's Independent Light Artillery Battery (Colorado)	December 15, 1862 – August 31, 1865.
1st Colorado Infantry Regiment	December 14, 1861 – November 18, 1865.
2nd Colorado Infantry Regiment	December 1861 – December 31, 1864.
3rd Colorado Infantry Regiment	September 1862 – September 23, 1865.
Denver City Home Guard	October 1861 – April 1, 1862.

== See also ==
- Lists of American Civil War Regiments by State
- Bibliography of Colorado
- Geography of Colorado
- History of Colorado
- Index of Colorado-related articles
- List of Colorado-related lists
- Outline of Colorado

== Bibliography ==
- Dyer, Frederick H. (1959). A Compendium of the War of the Rebellion. New York and London. Thomas Yoseloff, Publisher. LCCN 59-12963.
