= Battle of Byram's Ford =

1864 battle in the American Civil War

- Part of the American Civil War
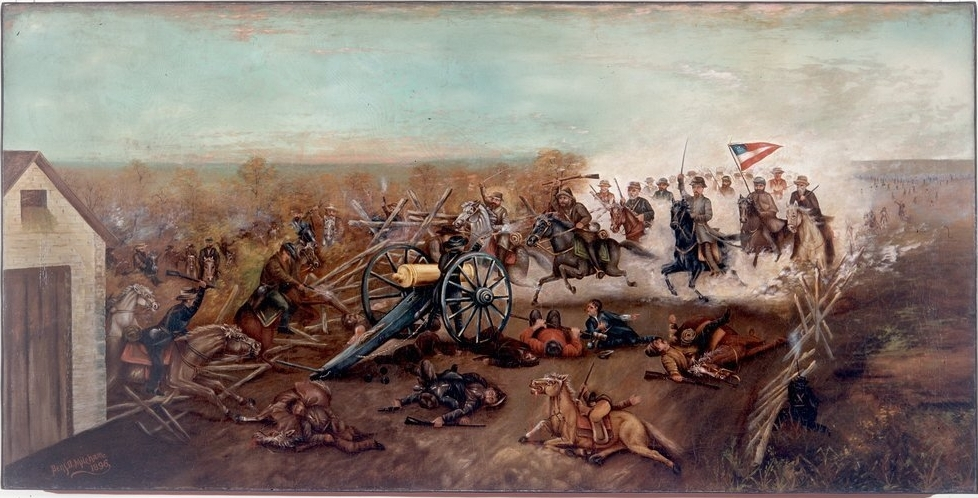
Date	October 22–23, 1864
Location	Jackson County, Missouri 39°01′22″N 94°31′51″W
Result	Union victory

Belligerents
United States (Union)	Confederate States

Commanders and leaders
(United States) James G. Blunt (United States) Alfred Pleasonton	(Confederate States of America) John S. Marmaduke (Confederate States of America) Joseph O. Shelby

Units involved
Blunt's Division; Pleasanton's Division	Marmaduke's Division; Shelby's Division
- Location within Missouri

The Battle of Byram's Ford, also known as the Battle of Big Blue River and the Battle of the Blue, was fought on October 22 and 23, 1864, in Jackson County, Missouri during Price's Missouri Expedition, a campaign of the American Civil War. With the Confederacy on the verge of collapse, Confederate Major General Sterling Price conducted an invasion of Missouri in the fall of 1864. When Union forces led Price to abandon his objective of capturing St. Louis, he turned west.

On October 22, Price's army found itself caught between two Union forces, commanded by Major Generals James G. Blunt and Alfred Pleasonton. Part of Price's force conducted a delaying action against Pleasonton in the Second Battle of Independence, while the division of Brigadier General Joseph O. Shelby broke Blunt's line at Byram's Ford on the Big Blue River by crossing at an unguarded ford above the Union defenses. The Union defenders were forced to retreat to the Kansas state line, and the 2nd Kansas State Militia Infantry Regiment was caught at the Mockbee Farm and overwhelmed. Meanwhile, Pleasonton's men pushed Price's rear guard across the Big Blue in the Second Battle of Independence.

On October 23, Pleasonton attacked Confederate forces under Major General John S. Marmaduke at Byram's Ford and forced them back to a height known as Potato Hill. Pleasonton broke through Marmaduke's position, and the rest of the Confederate army was defeated at the concurrent Battle of Westport. While Price's wagon train escaped from Union Brigadier General John McNeil and his brigade, the Confederate army withdrew southwards in disorder. After suffering further defeats along the way, Price's army reached Texas by December, having lost over two-thirds of its men. The Confederates also lost equipment and supplies, while the Union war effort was only minimally hampered; the campaign was the last major operation west of the Mississippi River. Part of the battlefield is preserved in the Big Blue Battlefield Park, and a portion is listed on the National Register of Historic Places as part of the Byram's Ford Historic District.

== Background ==
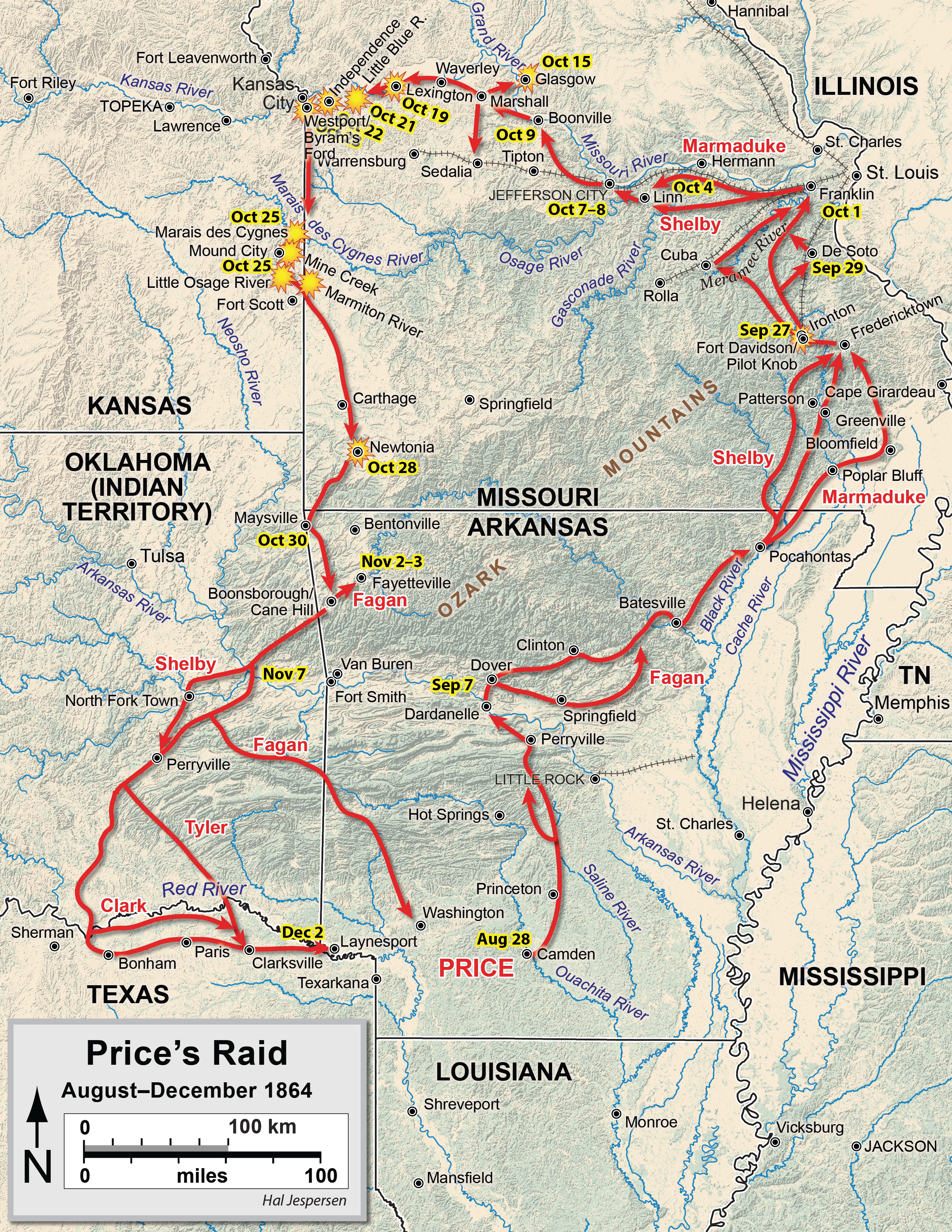
Map of Price's Raid

When the American Civil War began in April 1861, the state of Missouri did not secede – despite allowing slavery – as it was politically divided. Governor of Missouri Claiborne Fox Jackson supported secession and the Confederate States of America, both of which were opposed by Union Army elements under the command of Brigadier General Nathaniel Lyon. A combination of Confederate and allied pro-secession Missouri State Guard forces defeated Lyon at the Battle of Wilson's Creek in August, but were confined to southwestern Missouri by the end of the year. The state also developed two competing governments, one supporting the Union and the other the Confederacy. Control of Missouri passed to the Union in March 1862 after the Battle of Pea Ridge in Arkansas, and Confederate activity in Missouri was largely restricted to raids and guerrilla warfare through the rest of 1862 and into 1863.

By September 1864, the Confederacy had essentially no chance of a military victory, and incumbent U.S. resident Abraham Lincoln had an edge over George B. McClellan – who supported ending the war– in the 1864 United States presidential election. With the situation east of the Mississippi River collapsing, General Edmund Kirby Smith, commander of the Confederate Trans-Mississippi Department, was ordered to send his infantry across the river to more important areas of the war. This movement proved to be impossible, as a large-scale crossing of the Mississippi was prevented by Union Navy control of the river. Instead, Smith decided to attack the Union forces within his area of responsibility, despite having limited resources. Confederate Major General Sterling Price and Thomas Caute Reynolds, who had replaced Jackson as the head of the Confederate government of Missouri in February 1863 after the latter's death, proposed an invasion of Missouri. Smith approved of the plan and placed Price in command of the offensive. It was hoped that the invasion would start a popular uprising against Union control of the state, draw Union troops away from more important theaters of the war, and improve McClellan's chance of defeating Lincoln.

== Prelude ==
After entering Missouri on September 19, Price's column advanced north, only to suffer a bloody repulse at the Battle of Pilot Knob on September 27. Having suffered hundreds of casualties at Pilot Knob, Price decided not to attack the city of St. Louis, which was defended by 9,000 Union infantrymen. Instead, he aimed his command west, towards the state capital of Jefferson City. Encumbered by a slow-moving wagon train, Price's army took so long to reach Jefferson City that the Union was able to reinforce the garrison from 1,000 men to 7,000. Once Price reached Jefferson City in early October, he decided that it was too strong to attack, and continued moving west along the Missouri River. During this movement, the Confederates gathered recruits and supplies, as well as winning the Battle of Glasgow and capturing Sedalia.

=== Opposing forces ===
==== Confederate ====
Price's force, named the Army of Missouri, contained about 12,000 or 13,000 cavalrymen and 14 cannons. Several thousand of these men were either not armed or poorly armed, and all of Price's cannons were of light caliber. The Army of Missouri was organized into three divisions, commanded by Major General James F. Fagan and Brigadier Generals Joseph O. Shelby and John S. Marmaduke. Fagan's division contained four brigades commanded by Brigadier General William L. Cabell and Colonels William F. Slemons, Archibald S. Dobbins, and Thomas H. McCray; Shelby's division had three brigades under Colonels David Shanks (replaced by Brigadier General M. Jeff Thompson after Shanks was killed in action), Sidney D. Jackman, and Charles H. Tyler; and Marmaduke's division contained two brigades, commanded by Brigadier General John B. Clark Jr. and Colonel Thomas R. Freeman.

==== Union ====
Map of Missouri

Missouri was defended by the Union Department of the Missouri, under the command of Major General William S. Rosecrans. The department initially consisted of about 10,000 men, many of whom were militia and were scattered across the state in a system of districts and subdistricts. In September, part of the XVI Corps under the command of Major General Andrew Jackson Smith arrived in St. Louis to reinforce Rosecrans. Smith's troops were initially tasked with railroad repair, rather than active military operations. On October 6, in Jefferson City, a Union cavalry division was organized and placed under the command of Major General Alfred Pleasonton. Of the division's four brigades, one was part of Smith's command and had not yet reached Jefferson City. Composed of a mixture of Union Army troops and Missouri militia and supported by four cannons, Pleasonton's brigades were commanded by Brigadier Generals Egbert Brown, John McNeil and John B. Sanborn, and Colonel Edward F. Winslow. Sanborn temporarily commanded the formation until Pleasonton took full command on October 20.

Union troops in Kansas under the command of Major General Samuel R. Curtis were withdrawn from fighting the Cheyenne and the Kansas State Militia was mobilized. One of the officers withdrawn from the Cheyenne conflict was Major General James G. Blunt, who was appointed commander of the District of South Kansas on October 10 and ordered to collect available cavalry and move towards Kansas City. Within a week, Blunt had reached Hickman Mills, Missouri, where he reorganized his force into a division of three brigades. Two of the brigades were formed of Union Army troops, and the third contained Kansas militiamen. Colonels Charles R. "Doc" Jennison and Thomas Moonlight commanded the two brigades of Union Army troops, while Colonel Charles W. Blair commanded the brigade containing the militia (a single Union Army unit was included in Blair's brigade). Jennison's brigade was supported by five cannons, Moonlight's by four, and Blair's by eight. The inclusion of the militia proved problematic for Blunt, as the militiamen attempted to adhere to their former command structure, including viewing militia officer William Fishback as their proper commander instead of Blair. Curtis was hampered by state politics in his attempts to mobilize the Kansas State Militia, but a total of 15,000 men were eventually mustered. While the Kansas State Militia remained under Curtis's authority, George W. Dietzler, a major general in the organization, served as its general-in-chief. The Kansas State Militia used a brigade organization, but little detail about the exact breakdown is provided in the Official Records of the War of the Rebellion.

=== To the Big Blue River ===
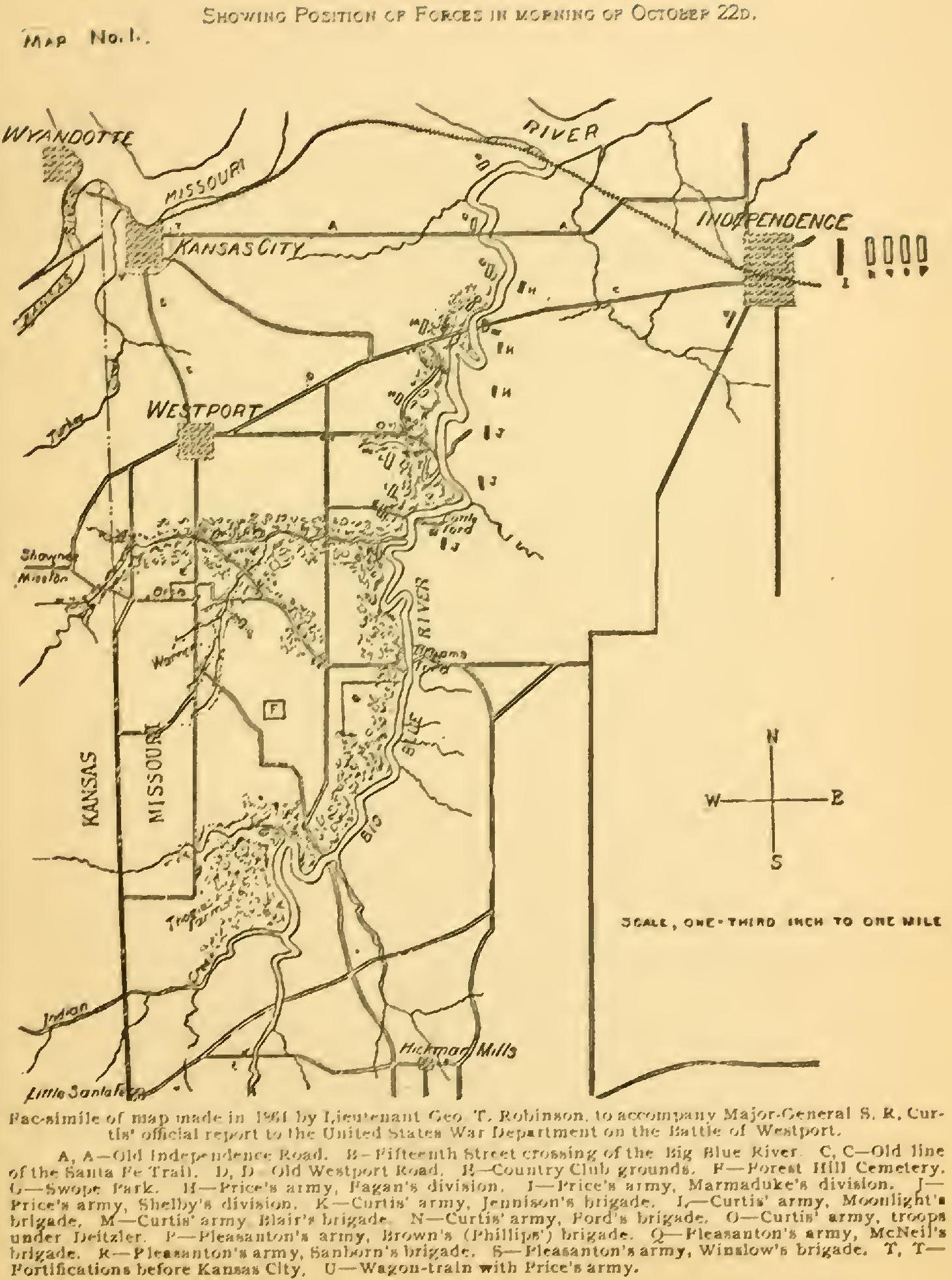
Map showing the relative locations of Independence, the Big Blue River, and the Missouri/Kansas state line

Late on October 16, Curtis made the decision to move his forces into Missouri and ordered Blunt to move east to Warrensburg; if Blunt did not find Price, he had the option to continue on to Lexington. Blair's brigade was sent to Kansas City. The lead portion of Blunt's column reached Lexington on October 18, with hopes of cooperating with Sanborn. Instead, Sanborn's men were too far away for cooperation, and Price was only 20 miles (32 km) east at Waverly. Blunt also learned that he could not expect reinforcements from Curtis, as political authorities in Kansas would not permit the Kansas State Militia to move further east than the Big Blue River. Price attacked Blunt with Shelby's division at Lexington on October 19, bringing on the Second Battle of Lexington. The Union soldiers put up a strong enough defense that Price was forced to commit more troops, and Blunt fell back in the evening.

The day after the fight at Lexington, Blunt fell back to the Little Blue River. He wanted to make a stand there, but Curtis ordered his troops back to Independence due to the restrictions on the movement of the Kansas State Militia. A single regiment and four cannons were left at the Little Blue as a rear guard. Confederate troops attacked the rear guard on October 21, bringing on the Battle of Little Blue River. Eventually, Confederate pressure on the Union center led these Union troops to retreat back to Independence. Late that evening, the Union troops abandoned Independence and took up positions behind the Big Blue 6 miles (9.7 km) to the west, while the Confederates occupied Independence. Pleasonton's division, which had converged on Price's army as it moved along the Missouri, was encamped 6 miles (10 km) to the east of the Little Blue.

Price was now caught between the positions of Curtis and Pleasonton. He formed a plan to conduct a feint attack on the northern part of the Union line at the Big Blue, while forcing his way across the river with a stronger attack further to the south. Delaying actions would hold off Pleasonton's men while the Confederate wagon train crossed the Big Blue. Curtis, who was hampered by significantly inaccurate maps, had divided his army into two wings. Deitzler commanded the left wing, which consisted of detached brigade, but his control was only nominal, and Blair made most of the decisions. Despite being detached, Blair's men served as more of a brigade under Blunt's command than a separate wing of the army. Blunt commanded the right wing, which included the brigades of Ford, Moonlight, and Jennison. The 2nd Colorado Cavalry Regiment was sent across the river to act as skirmishers. As not all of the Kansas State Militia was fully mobilized, and the strength of those units that had arrived at Kansas City had been reduced greatly due to men lagging behind on the march, Curtis had around 5,000 men in his force, which was known as the Army of the Border. Aside from a ford at the extreme end of the Union line near the Missouri River which Curtis did not expect Price to use due to the depth of water there, the Union line was much stronger on its north end. Twelve cannons supported the position. Curtis relied on the rough terrain around the Big Blue to limit Price to crossing at the fords. The Union line stretched 15 miles (24 km) from the Missouri to Hickman Mills.

== Battle ==
=== October 22: Shelby crosses the Big Blue ===
==== Fight for Byram's Ford ====
At around 08:00, fighting began when Shelby drove Union skirmishers back across the Big Blue. About an hour later, Jackman's brigade of about 1,500 men feinted against the north portion of the Union line, although Curtis did not fall for the ruse, as he believed the fighting was too dilatory to represent a primary attack. When Union officers on the north part of the line reported seeing minimal Confederate activity on the road to Kansas City, Curtis became more convinced that the northern Confederate threat was not a primary attack, and concerned about a potential flanking attack to the south. He then gave Blunt, along with Melvin S. Grant – who commanded two Kansas State Militia regiments positioned to the south near Hickman Mills – orders to watch for Confederate movements and to send reports back every half hour. At 11:00, men of the 2nd Colorado Cavalry reported that Confederate forces were moving for the southern fords, and the dust clouds kicked up by the moving troops were sighted by the occupants of a Union signal tower further north.

Also at around 11:00, Shelby decided to attempt to force a crossing of the Big Blue at Byram's Ford, which was in the southern portion of the Union line. Byram's Ford had been occupied by Jennison's brigade since around 09:00, defensive works being prepared by one of Grant's militia regiments the night before. Felled trees and other obstructions blocked the ford, but only the brush on the Union side of the river had been cleared, meaning that the Confederates had cover, but not that element of Jennison's brigade which was in the immediate vicinity of the ford. Jennison's approximately 1,200 men were largely positioned on high ground to the west of the ford, with only a strong skirmish line and five mountain howitzers defending the ford itself.

The first sizable Confederate force to reach Byram's Ford was Thompson's brigade, which numbered about 1,445 men. Thompson's attacks were not successful, but his men kept pressure on Jennison's position, resulting in the 16th Kansas Cavalry Regiment and possibly a Missouri militia unit being sent to reinforce Jennison. The fighting between Thompson and Jennison continued for three hours, during which time Jackman sent two units from his brigade – Nichols's Missouri Cavalry Regiment and Schnable's Missouri Cavalry Battalion – to reinforce Thompson. Around 14:00, Thompson and Shelby decided to seek alternate fords to outflank Jennison's stubborn defense. Colonel B. Frank Gordon and his 5th Missouri Cavalry Regiment were sent to the south, with orders to cross the river, turn north, and cut Jennison off from any reinforcements; Gordon's men found a ford and crossed without incident. Slayback's Missouri Cavalry Battalion was sent north, where it quickly found Hinkle's Ford – a crossing used by local farmers – that had been left unguarded.

The crossings both above and below Byram's Ford led to a general breakthrough. Participants in the battle provided times ranging from 14:00 to 15:00 for when the Confederates crossed the river; the modern historian Mark A. Lause believes that the variation in these estimates is due to the breakthrough occurring in stages. Outflanked, Jennison was forced to fall back, which opened the crossing at Byram's Ford. The Union soldiers had abandoned several axes at the ford, which allowed the Confederates to clear the obstructions within about an hour. Jennison's brigade attempted to retreat to the northwest in the direction of Westport, but were prevented from moving north by the Confederates who had crossed at Hinkle's Ford. The Union brigade wound up retreating 4 miles (6 km), eventually crossing the state line and entering Kansas. Blunt had ordered Moonlight's brigade to support Jennison around 13:00, but Moonlight did not receive the order. After Moonlight learned from his scouts that Jennison had been driven back, he sent his brigade to support Jennison, but arrived at Hinkle's Ford after the Confederates had crossed. He then withdrew towards Westport.

==== The Mockbee Farm ====
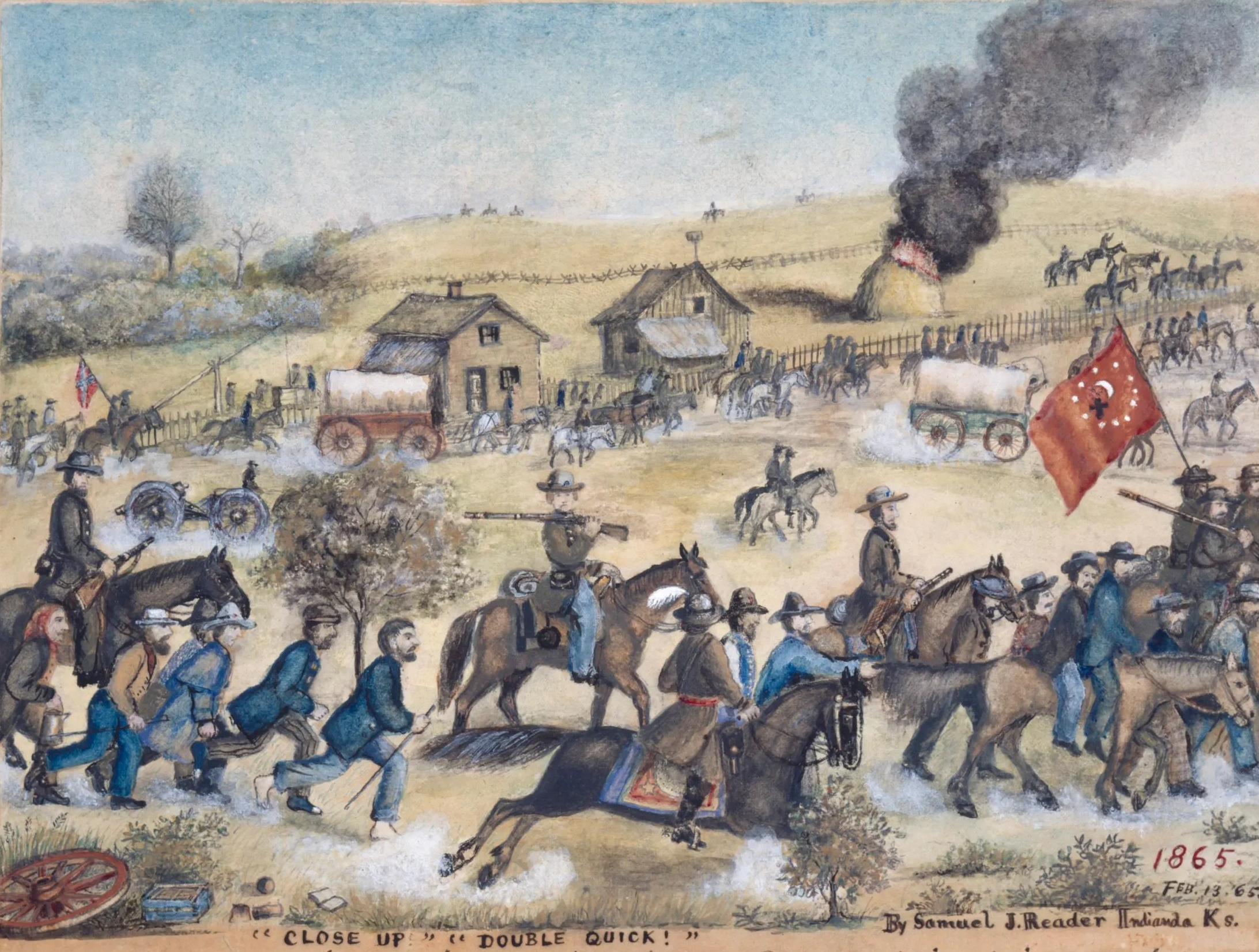
An 1865 depiction of Confederate cavalry escorting Union prisoners during Price's Raid, by Samuel J. Reader

Moonlight's brigade eventually reached the state line, where it deployed next to Jennison's brigade. Jennison, who was the senior officer, did not take overall command of the two-brigade force, and Thompson's Confederates pressed the leaderless Union line. Curtis had sent his escort to reinforce Jennison at Byram's Ford, placing the escort under the command of his chief of artillery, Major Robert H. Hunt. Hunt's party found that Jennison had withdrawn, and followed Moonlight's men to the state line. With the Confederates threatening the Union line, Hunt formed a strong skirmish line, counterattacked Thompson's men, and disorganized the Confederate ranks. Curtis ordered a complete withdrawal, leading to the retreat of Ford's brigade and Deitzler's militia, although the 19th Kansas State Militia Infantry Regiment, which was part of Blair's brigade, was forced to fight off a Confederate attack. Meanwhile, Grant and his Kansas State Militia units south of Byram's Ford had become aware that they were in danger of being cut off from the rest of the Union army. Grant ordered his units to move towards Westport independently, but the force was in a state of disorganization. Shelby did not know that Grant's force was disordered, and believed that the Union units constituted a threat, so he sent Jackman's brigade to the south to cover that part of the Confederate line.

Grant's withdrawing men encountered Gordon and the 5th Missouri Cavalry Regiment, who had crossed at the southern ford, and were quickly scattered, isolating a 24-pounder howitzer attached to the 2nd Kansas State Militia Infantry Regiment; the regiment was under the command of Colonel George W. Veale. The 21-man gun crew received support from the rest of its regiment, and the unit deployed at Thomas Mockbee's farm. (Note: Also spelled Moccabee or Mockabee) As well as the gun crew, about 250 to 300 men from the 2nd Kansas State Militia Infantry Regiment were on the field. The gunners opened fire on the Confederates, who were positioned in a grove of locust trees on a nearby hill. While the first several rounds were ineffective, the Union artillerists eventually found the range and forced the Confederates down into a ravine. This fighting led to two decisions: Grant elected to attempt to hold at the Mockbee Farm, believing he would receive reinforcements from Hickman Mills and have the ability to fight his way to Westport; Shelby began pulling troops from the pursuit of Jennison to enter the fighting at the Mockbee Farm.

Before the reinforcements from Shelby arrived, Gordon attacked the Union position, but was repulsed. Jackman's brigade had been the first unit pulled towards the Mockbee Farm, but the stout resistance led Shelby to believe he was facing Pleasonton's division, causing him to order all but a single regiment of Thompson's brigade to the farm, as well. A second attack by Gordon, with some of Jackman's men involved, was also repulsed. For the third attack, Jackman added the new recruits and unarmed men associated with his brigade to the attacking column. This time, the Confederate numerical advantage was too much for the 2nd Kansas State Militia Infantry Regiment, and the unit and cannon were overrun. Union reinforcements arrived in the form of the 21st Kansas State Militia Infantry Regiment and part of the 15th Kansas Cavalry Regiment, but the 15th Kansas Cavalry withdrew towards the state line before the Confederate attack reached them, leaving the militiamen on their own. The 21st Kansas State Militia Infantry Regiment withdrew about 1 mile (1.6 km) after fighting the Confederate attackers, but the unit was overrun.

=== Independence and interlude ===
Pleasonton had been active on the 22nd as well. McNeil's brigade reached the Little Blue before sunrise, and pushed the Confederate rear guard at the river back after about half an hour. Pleasonton's division finished crossing the river at around 11:00, and pushed Slemons's Confederate brigade back towards Independence, in the Second Battle of Independence. By 13:30, the Union troops were almost halfway to Independence. Once Pleasonton's men reached the city, the Confederates had broken Curtis's line on the Big Blue, but Price's wagon train was still on the west side of the river. The brigades of Clark, Cabell, and Freeman made a stand at Independence to buy time for the wagon train to cross. McNeil's and Sanborn's brigades successfully attacked the Independence position, but became too disorganized during the assault to continue the pursuit. Pleasonton brought up the brigades of Brown and Winslow, which attacked Marmaduke's division. While the Confederates were driven back, they held long enough to allow the wagon train to cross. The Union advance ended at 22:30, within a few miles of the Big Blue.

That evening, Price established his headquarters at a house west of Byram's Ford; Shelby regrouped his men near the structure. One regiment was left near Brush Creek to observe the Union position near Westport. Curtis had sent Blunt's troops to Westport, while the Kansas State Militia was sent to Kansas City to be resupplied. By 03:00 on October 23, Curtis and Blunt had developed a battle plan for the day: Ford, Jennison, and Moonlight would cross Brush Creek with their brigades and attack the Confederates, while Blair remained in reserve. On the Confederate side, Price also planned an attack in the Brush Creek area, about 3 miles (4.8 km) to the west, using Fagan and Shelby's divisions. Pleasonton's men were also on the move at this time: McNeil's brigade moved south from Independence towards Hickman Mills beginning at 01:00 on the 23rd, while Sanborn left Independence to rejoin Brown and Winslow at 05:00. Smith's XVI Corps began a movement towards Independence that morning from an encampment 16 miles (26 km) to the east, as well. Price assigned two brigades to escort his wagon train and sent it south towards Little Santa Fe via Hickman Mills.

=== October 23: Pleasonton crosses the river ===
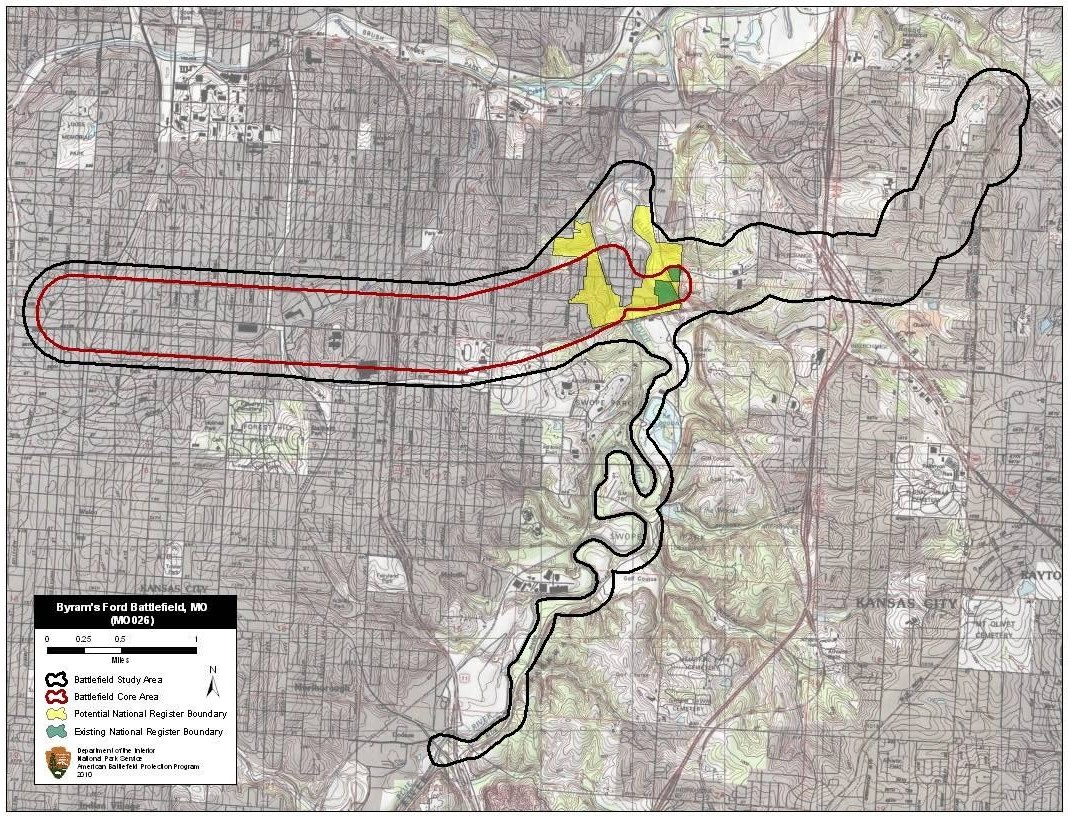
Map of Byram's Ford by the American Battlefield Protection Program.

==== Fight at the ford ====
Pleasonton planned an assault on Byram's Ford, which was to be led by Brown's brigade, which Pleasonton's orders stated "[had] as yet done no fighting". This movement required Brown's men to pass through Winslow's brigade. Also, one of Brown's regiments, the 1st Missouri State Militia Cavalry Regiment, had lost contact with the rest of the brigade, and could not be immediately found. Brown ran at least 90 minutes late, and when Pleasonton arrived, he placed Brown and Colonel James McFerran, the commander of the 1st Missouri State Militia Cavalry, under arrest for being late and allowing units to become disorganized. (Brown was later acquitted at a court martial.) Colonel John F. Philips replaced Brown as brigade commander and Winslow was given general command of the attack.

While the Confederates had worked on clearing the ford the previous day, obstructions still remained, and the Confederates had strengthened the defenses. Marmaduke's men defended the ford, with Freeman's brigade at the ford itself and Clark's brigade further to the west on a height known as Potato Hill. (Note: Potato Hill was renamed Bloody Hill after the battle.) About 200 yards (180 m) west of the ford was a rock ledge, with Potato Hill several hundreds yards further from the river. Skirmishers from the 3rd Missouri Cavalry Regiment and the 4th Missouri Cavalry Regiment were with Freeman's brigade, and Harris's Missouri Battery and Hynson's Texas Battery were positioned on Potato Hill. While Winslow made his attack, Sanborn's brigade and Pleasonton's divisional artillery remained in reserve, with three Rodman guns from Battery H, 2nd Missouri Light Artillery Regiment, firing on the Confederate lines. Between the brigades of Philips and Winslow, there were about 2,700 Union soldiers present, against about 2,500 Confederates.

At either around 08:00 or 09:00, the Union attack began. The 7th Missouri State Militia Cavalry Regiment attacked, but was quickly forced to halt. A battalion of the 4th Iowa Cavalry Regiment crossed the river at a ravine 300 yards (270 m) to the north and began firing into the Confederate flank. Winslow led another charge, and the Confederates fell back. Some took up positions along the rock ledge, (Note: The ledge is reported as being 12 foot (3.7 m) to 15 foot (4.6 m) or 15 foot (4.6 m) to 20 foot (6.1 m) tall) while most fell back even further west to the main Confederate line on the hilltop. Winslow paused for about 30 minutes to bring up more troops before making an assault against the Confederate lines.

==== Potato Hill ====
The path the Union soldiers would have to take to attack Potato Hill sloped upwards and was covered with tree stumps. Both the rock ledge and a log house on top of the hill provided cover for the Confederates, who also placed sharpshooters in the tops of trees. Wanting to quickly capture the Confederate position, Winslow ordered Phillips to make a charge. The path from the ford was narrow, so Phillips only sent a single unit, the 1st Missouri State Militia Cavalry, down the road, which was in the field of fire of Hynson's battery. The 7th Missouri State Militia Cavalry and the 4th Missouri State Militia Cavalry Regiment advanced on the left side of the road in support. The 1st Missouri State Militia Cavalry advanced mounted in a column of fours. Attacking twice, the unit was repulsed both times.

Winslow's response was to form a line to the right of the road with the 4th Iowa Cavalry, 3rd Iowa Cavalry Regiment, and the 10th Missouri Cavalry Regiment; men from the 2nd New Jersey Cavalry Regiment served as sharpshooters strengthening the center of the line. Phillip's brigade was positioned on the left (southern) side of the road. Almost all of the Union troops dismounted for the attack, and many were armed with repeating rifles, which provided a significant firepower advantage. The Confederate line was held by Clark's brigade, with Freeman's men in reserve. At about 11:00, the Union cavalry attacked.

As the Union troops charged towards the rock ledge, Winslow was shot in the leg; Lieutenant Colonel Frederick W. Benteen took over command of his brigade. Heavy Confederate fire blunted the attack, and Sanborn's brigade was brought up in support. The Union troops rallied and charged again, driving the Confederates back from the ledge. In response, Marmaduke pulled his artillery back from Clark's line to Freeman's. A general Union assault followed, and the crest of Potato Hill was carried. Pleasonton brought Sanborn's brigade forward into the action, while Marmaduke attempted to make a stand with Freeman's men. That stand did not last long, as Marmaduke quickly withdrew, having seen Sanborn's fresh troops enter the fray. Benteen and Phillips halted their brigades to rest and resupply while Sanborn chased the Confederates 1 mile (1.6 km) to the Harrisonville Road. By noon, a path had been opened for Pleasonton to join forces with Curtis.

==== Confederate collapse ====
Shelby had not officially heard from Marmaduke, but was aware of the sounds of fighting and had heard rumors from stragglers. As his division was currently stalled in the Battle of Westport, Shelby sent Jackman's brigade to Fagan at the Mockbee Farm. The unit was soon redirected to the Harrisonville Road, where it encountered Sanborn's brigade. Supported by one cannon from Collins's Missouri Battery, Jackman's men repulsed an attack from Sanborn. Meanwhile, at Westport, an attack by Jennison's brigade broke Thompson's brigade, and Shelby's men fled to the rear. The collapse occurred at about 14:00. Seeing Shelby's command disintegrate, Jackman withdrew in the face of Sanborn's brigade. Sanborn pursued Jackman, who conducted a fighting withdrawal. Shelby attempted to make another stand, but was struck by the brigades of Benteen and Phillips while Blunt's division from Curtis's force pushed southwards. A Confederate attack by Elliot's Missouri Cavalry Regiment was repulsed, and the Confederate retreat became a southbound stampede.

==== McNeil and the wagon train ====
Price's wagon train was to make its way south via the Harrisonville Road and recross the Big Blue to the south side, before continuing south for 3 miles (4.8 km). The train then moved onto an unnamed road, which it followed southwest and across the Big Blue to the west side, after which it reached the Fort Scott Road south of Little Santa Fe. McNeil's brigade, which was supposed to intercept the wagon train, started on its movement late, and halted at 04:00. McNeil observed Confederate campfires at that time, but thought he was both further north than he actually was and that he was possibly isolated from the main Union force and in danger. He then paused for about 90 minutes to send out scouts, who reported that the Confederates were leaving their position. Continuing their movement south, the Union troops sighted the Confederate train at about 09:00 or 10:00. At 10:00, Price arrived on the scene and made tactical dispositions to protect the train. Tyler's brigade, which largely consisted of unarmed men, was deployed to the north of a road intersection, Cabell's brigade to the east of the intersection, and McCray's brigade on Cabell's right. Two hundred men, either the few armed men from Tyler's brigade, or a mixture of men from Tyler's brigade and Price's personal escort, served as skirmishers. Overall, about 4,000 or 5,000 Confederate soldiers guarded the train, although only about half of them were armed. The Confederates also had artillery present from at least Hughey's Arkansas Battery.

McNeil advanced against the train at around either 13:00 or 14:00. With a battery of mountain howitzers and three Rodman guns from Battery L, 2nd Missouri Light Artillery Regiment, firing, McNeil moved his brigade into the dry bed of Hart Grove Creek. Two companies from the 17th Illinois Cavalry Regiment and the 2nd Missouri Cavalry Regiment advanced against the Confederates, who had a numerical advantage. The Union 7th Kansas Cavalry Regiment was also engaged at this time. The 5th Missouri State Militia Cavalry Regiment guarded the Union left against McCray's brigade. The 5th Missouri State Militia Cavalry was forced to extend its line to meet a threat from McCray's Confederates, and with artillery fire striking his line, McNeil, who was under the impression that he was facing the entire Confederate army, withdrew. The Union cavalrymen watched the Confederates retreat until nightfall. Price's men did not stop their retreat until 21:00, in southern Cass County. Most of the Union forces halted for the night near Little Santa Fe, except for Jennison's brigade, which continued 4 miles (6 km) further south.

== Aftermath ==
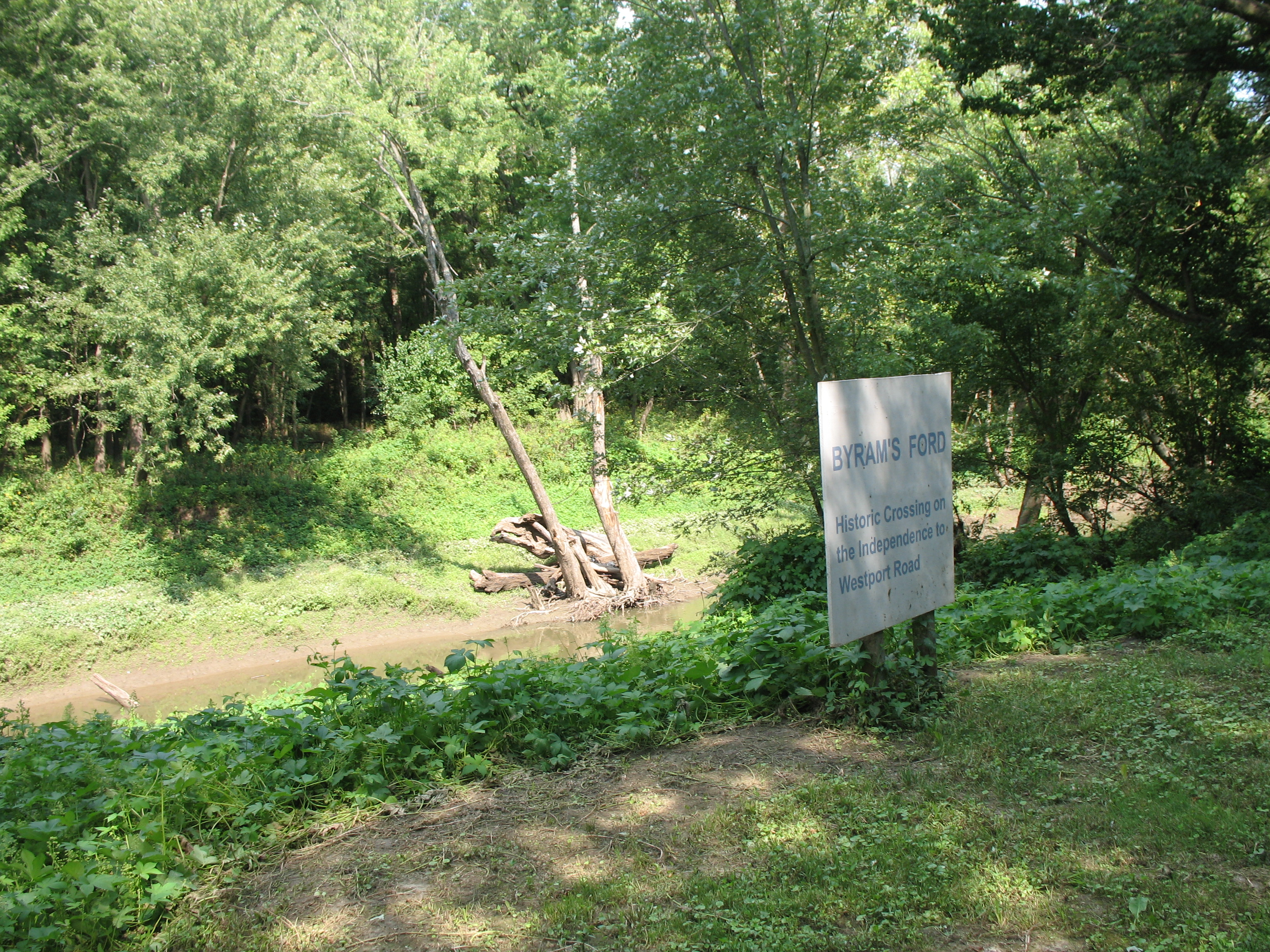
Byram's Ford Battlefield

Total casualties suffered during the battle are unknown. According to the historian Kyle Sinisi in The Last Hurrah: Sterling Price's Missouri Expedition of 1864, the fight at the Mockbee Farm resulted in 43 Confederate casualties, and about 50 Union soldiers killed or wounded, as well as 68 prisoners. Confederates from Jackman's brigade executed some of the Union prisoners, although Shelby acted to stop this. The historian Howard Monnett places Union casualties for the Mockbee Farm fighting as over 100 killed, more wounded than killed, and 102 taken prisoner. Casualty reporting for both sides for the October 23 action at Byram's Ford and Potato Hill was incomplete. Only three of Marmaduke's regiments reported losses, totaling 25 men killed or wounded; Sinisi uses this figure to estimate that Marmaduke probably lost about 50 men during that stage of the fighting. On the Union side, the 1st Missouri State Militia Cavalry reported a total loss of 12 men, while the 4th Missouri State Militia Cavalry reported 51 men killed or wounded. Winslow estimated that 25 men from his brigade were killed or wounded, but that figure included the brigade's fighting on October 22 and in later stages of the October 23 action. A 1912 newspaper report stated that 300 Confederates fell on Potato Hill, and the historian Mark A. Lause states that 122 Union soldiers were killed during the October 23 fighting for Potato Hill and the ford. Monnett places Union losses in capturing Potato Hill at about 200. When figuring total October 23 losses (including both Byram's Ford and Westport), Lause estimates about 475 to 650 Union casualties and 700 to 1,000 for the Confederates. Unpublished research by Bryce Suderow estimates losses of 510 Confederates and 361 Union soldiers for all fighting on the 23rd. Sinisi considers Lause's figures to be too high, and prefers Suderow's numbers.

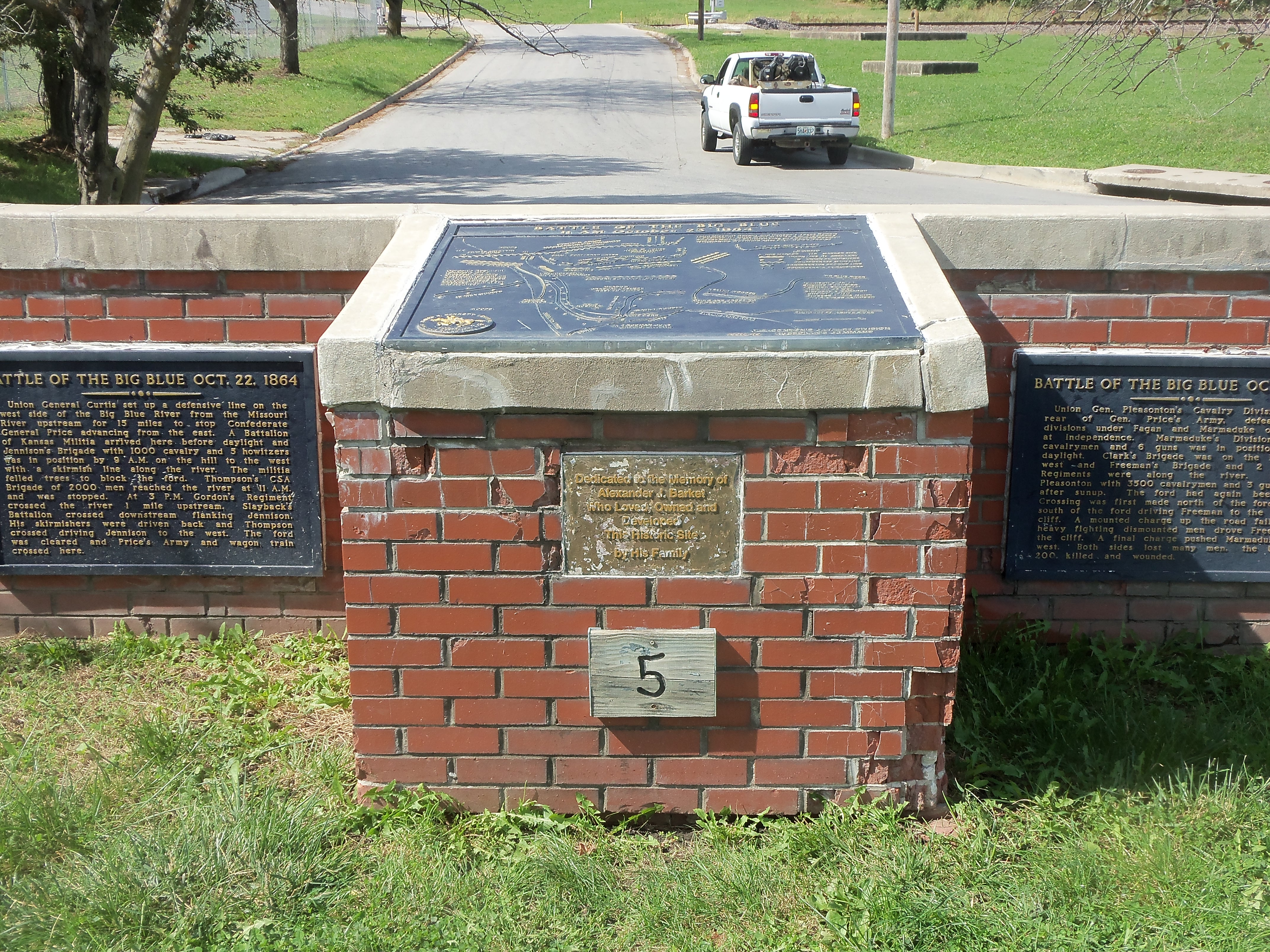
Plaques commemorating the battle

Following the defeats at Byram's Ford and Westport, Price's Confederates withdrew to the south. On October 25, they suffered three defeats on the same day. One of the three was a disastrous rout at the Battle of Mine Creek in Kansas, in which Marmaduke was captured and the Confederates lost heavily in men and cannons. Following a further defeat on October 28 in Missouri at the Second Battle of Newtonia, Price's army retreated to the Arkansas River via Cane Hill, Arkansas. Union pursuit halted at the Arkansas on November 8, and the Confederates retreated through the Indian Territory into Texas, arriving by December. The campaign had cost Price over two-thirds of his men, along with equipment and supplies; the Union war effort was only minimally affected. No further large-scale operations occurred in the Trans-Mississippi.

Part of the battlefield is listed on the National Register of Historic Places as part of the Byram's Ford Historic District. The Big Blue Battlefield Park preserves 86.22 acres (34.89 ha) of the battlefield, including traces of original earthworks. A 2011 report by the American Battlefield Protection Program noted that much of the Byram's Ford battlefield, especially the western portions, had been covered over by the expansion of Kansas City. The same study noted that while 18.37 acres (7.43 ha) of the battlefield were on the National Register of Historic Places, a further 167.29 acres (67.70 ha) may be eligible for listing. The site is within Freedom's Frontier National Heritage Area. The American Battlefield Trust has contributed to the preservation of 39 acres (16 ha) of the Byram's Ford battlefield. The battle has also been known as the Battle of Big Blue River and the Battle of the Blue.

== See also ==
- List of American Civil War battles
- List of battles 1801–1900
- Troop engagements of the American Civil War, 1864
