= Denver City Home Guard =

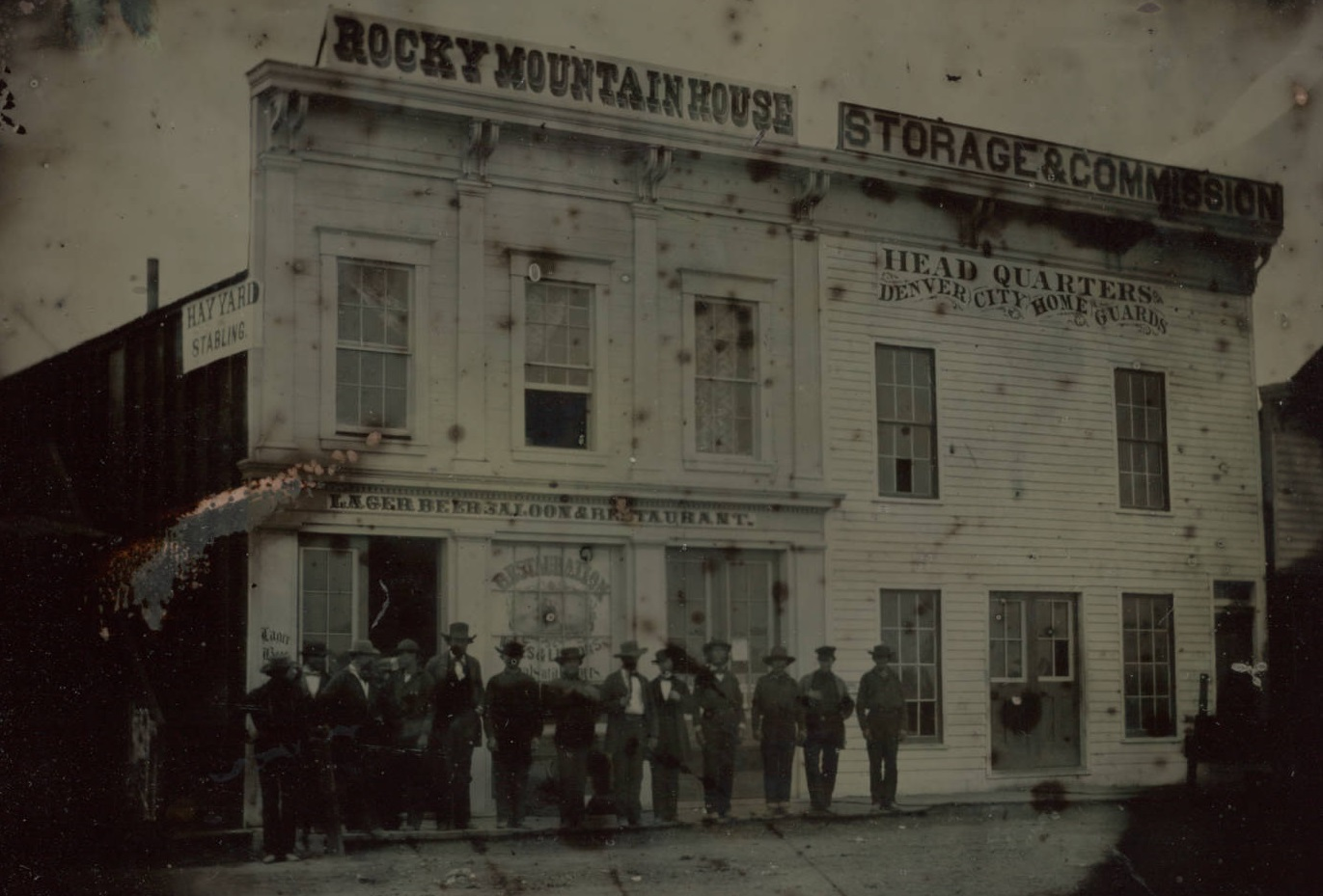
- Headquarters and members of the Denver City Home Guard
- Active: August 1861 - April 1862
- Disbanded: April 1862
- Country: United States
- Allegiance: Union
- Engagements: American Civil War

Commanders
- Company 1: Captain Joseph Ziegelmuller
- Company 2: Captain James W. Iddings

The Denver City Home Guard was a formation of militia during the American Civil War, raised from Denver City in the Colorado Territory. The unit was mustered out in April 1862.

== History ==
In September and early October, 1861, Colorado Territorial Governor William Gilpin enlisted men for six month service, into the Denver City Home Guard, which consisted of two companies, designated No. 1 and No. 2. Joseph Ziegelmuller was the Captain of Company 1, and James W. Iddings was Captain of Company 2. Other officers for Company 1 were: 1st Lieutenant Jacob Garres, and 2nd Lieutenant William Wise. For Company 2: 1st Lieutenant John A. Latta, and 2nd Lieutenant Adamson T. Dayton. Though militia, these guards were regularly mustered into the United States service. The 200 men saw no action, but they served in Denver City and at Camp Weld, and were mustered out by Captain W. H. Bachus in March and April 1862.

In December of 1861, the owner of the Rocky Mountain Brewery gave a silk American flag to the company.

== See also ==
- List of Colorado Territory Civil War units

== Bibliography ==
- Dyer, Frederick H. (1959). A Compendium of the War of the Rebellion. Sagamore Press; Thomas Yoseloff. New York. LCCN 59-12963.
