= Hart Grove Creek =

Stream in Jackson County, Missouri, US

Coordinates: 38.9705619°N 94.5482882°W

Hart Grove Creek is a stream in Jackson County in the U.S. state of Missouri.

Hart Grove Creek was named after the local Hart family which settled in a nearby grove.

== See also ==
- List of rivers of Missouri
