= James Hobart Ford =

- Born: May 22, 1829; Painesville, Ohio
- Died: January 12, 1867 (aged 37); Akron, Ohio
- Burial place: Glendale Cemetery, Akron, Ohio
- Military career
- Allegiance: United States of America; Union
- Branch: United States Army; Union Army
- Service years: 1861–1865
- Rank: Colonel brevet brigadier general
- Nickname: "Jim"
- Commands: Ford's Independent Company; 2nd Colorado Volunteer Cavalry; District of the Upper Arkansas
- Conflicts: American Civil War; Battle of Glorieta Pass; Battle of Little Blue River; Battle of Westport; Battle of Mine Creek; Battle of Camden Point; Second Battle of Newtonia; American Indian Wars

James Hobart Ford (May 22, 1829 – January 12, 1867) was a Union colonel and brevet brigadier general during the American Civil War, notable for his contributions in the Trans-Mississippi Theater of the war.

== Early life ==
James Hobart Ford was born in Painesville, Ohio, in 1829. His uncle was David Tod, U.S. Minister to Brazil and governor of Ohio during the Civil War. Much of Ford's early life is unclear, but sometime before 1861 he moved from Ohio to Colorado. He married in May 1850 to Arabella Stambaugh, daughter of John F. Stambaugh and Sara Beaver. They had 4 children, David Tod Ford, James R. Ford, John S. Ford and Sara Stambaugh Ford.

== Civil War ==
=== New Mexico ===
Ford became involved in the Civil War when Confederate forces invaded New Mexico. Colonel Edward Canby called for reinforcements from the nearby Colorado Territory to help in the defense of New Mexico. The people of Colorado responded quickly and Ford took command of one company raised in Cañon City and was appointed captain on December 21, 1861. This company would be known as "Ford's Independent Company" even though it received an official designation as Company "A", 2nd Colorado Volunteer Infantry Regiment.

As Ford marched his company towards Fort Union, he absorbed a number of soldiers from the 1st and 4th New Mexico Volunteer Regiments. Upon his arrival at Fort Union, Ford's company was reassigned as Company "G" of the 4th New Mexico Volunteer Regiment. It is likely Ford and his men never styled themselves Company G, as they continued to function independently of either regiment.

Colonel John P. Slough, another Coloradan, arrived at Fort Union and took command of the Union forces there. Slough planned an advance against the approaching Confederate army, assigning Ford and his company to Maj. John M. Chivington's flanking column. In the ensuing Battle of Glorieta Pass, Ford participated in the action near Johnson's Ranch, which captured the Confederate supply train.

=== Kansas-Missouri ===
On November 1, 1862, Ford was promoted to major of the 2nd Colorado Infantry. In October 1862 the 2nd Colorado and 3rd Colorado Infantry Regiments were consolidated to form the 2nd Colorado Cavalry and on November 5, 1863, Ford was appointed colonel. For much of the war Colonel Ford was stationed in Missouri operating against bushwackers along the Kansas-Missouri border.

=== Price's Missouri raid ===
In October 1864, Confederate General Sterling Price led a raid into Missouri. General Samuel R. Curtis, commander of the Department of Kansas, began assembling Union forces to oppose Price. Colonel Ford was placed in command of the 4th Brigade in James G. Blunt's 1st Division of Curtis' newly formed Army of the Border. Ford led his brigade into action at the Battle of Little Blue River. His brigade then held the left flank of the Union Army at the Battle of Westport and was heavily engaged in the fighting along Brush Creek. Blunt used Ford's and Colonel Charles R. Jennison's brigades to lead the Federal assault. After the Confederate defeat at Westport, Ford took part in the Federal pursuit, fighting in the battles of Mine Creek and Newtonia.

=== Later service and death ===
On December 12, 1864, President Abraham Lincoln nominated Ford for appointment to the grade of brevet brigadier general of volunteers, to rank from December 10, 1864, and the United States Senate confirmed the appointment on February 14, 1865. He commanded the District of the Upper Arkansas for the remainder of the war conducting operations against Native Americans from Fort Larned.

Ford was discharged from the Union army on July 19, 1865. Shortly after the end of the war, he returned to Ohio where he died on January 12, 1867, in Akron.

Ford County, Kansas was named in his honor.

== See also ==
- List of American Civil War brevet generals (Union)
