= Montgomery City, California =

Unincorporated community in California, United States

Montgomery City
- Unincorporated community
- Location in California Montgomery City (the United States)
- Coordinates: 37°49′43″N 118°25′51″W
- Country: United States
- State: California
- County: Mono
- Elevation: 6,450 ft (1,966 m)

Montgomery City was an unincorporated community in Mono County, California, United States. It was located 2.5 miles (4 km) east-northeast of Benton, at an elevation of 6450 feet (1966 m).

Silver was discovered in the nearby mountains in 1863, and the Montgomery Consolidated Gold and Silver Mining Company was organized the following year, which led to a local silver rush. Montgomery City sprang up quickly and boasted "half a hundred tents and cabins...four or five saloons, a blacksmith's shop, the recorder's office, and a store or two", but soon declined and was only scattered ruins by the 1970s.
