= Battle of Camden Point =

Battle of the American Civil War

- Part of the Trans-Mississippi Theater of the American Civil War
Date	July 13, 1864
Location	Camden Point, Missouri 39°27′12″N 94°44′43″W
Result	Union victory

Belligerents
United States of America	(Confederate States of America) CSA (Confederacy)

Commanders and leaders
Colonel James Hobart Ford	Colonel J. C. Thornton

Strength
700–1,000	200–300

Casualties and losses
4 killed, 1 wounded	4 executed, 2 killed, 25 wounded

The Battle of Camden Point took place on July 13, 1864, near Camden Point, Missouri, USA.

During the mid-1864 Paw Paw Rebellion in north-western Missouri, detachments of Federal troops crossed the Missouri River and occupied Platte County, Missouri. At this time a Confederate cavalry force approximately 200-300 strong under Colonel J. C. Thornton was organizing around Camden Point. On July 13, Thornton's men held a picnic in an open pasture near the town. Detachments of the 2nd Colorado Cavalry and 15th Kansas Cavalry, with one piece of artillery, all under command of Colonel Jim Ford, of the Second Colorado, totaling 700 - 1,000 soldiers, ambushed Thornton's picnicking force, routing it and killing two and wounding approximately 25 Confederates. The 2nd Colorado Cavalry had suffered one killed and one wounded. Three of these wounded Federals later died from their wounds. Four additional Confederates were captured and executed by Federals after the battle ended. Ammunition, weapons, and gunpowder were captured and Camden Point was burned.

The battle flag of the Confederate forces was captured as well, and now resides in the possession of the Colorado State Historical Society. In 1871, a memorial to the Confederates killed in the engagement was erected at the Pleasant Grove Cemetery near Camden Point where the Confederate slain are buried and is the third oldest Confederate memorial west of the Mississippi River. Two older Confederate memorials can be found in Lone Jack, Missouri and Cowen Cemetery (Wayne County, Missouri) erected in 1870.

== Bibliography ==
- Dyer, Frederick H., (1959), A Compendium of the War of the Rebellion. [Hardcover]. 3 Volumes.
