= 48th Cavalry =

48th Cavalry may refer to:

- 48th Arkansas Infantry (Mounted), sometimes referred to as the 48th Arkansas Cavalry
- 48th (North Somerset) Company, Imperial Yeomanry

== See also ==
- 48th Division (disambiguation)
- 48th Brigade (disambiguation)
- 48th Regiment (disambiguation)
- 48th (disambiguation)
