= XXXXVIII Corps =

XXXXVIII Corps, XLVIII Corps, or 48th Corps may refer to:

- XXXXVIII Panzer Corps, Wehrmacht, Germany
- 48th Army Corps (Russian Empire)
- 48th Separate Guards Army Corps, Soviet Union
- 48th (Prescott) Lancashire Rifle Volunteer Corps, United Kingdom
- 48th Middlesex Rifle Volunteer Corps (Havelock's Temperance Volunteers), United Kingdom

== See also ==
- List of military corps by number
- 48th Battalion (disambiguation)
- 48th Brigade (disambiguation)
- 48th Division (disambiguation)
- 48th Regiment (disambiguation)
- 48th Squadron (disambiguation)
- 48th (disambiguation)
