= 48th =

48th is the ordinal form of the number 48. 48th or Forty-eighth may also refer to:

- A fraction, 1/48, equal to one of 48 equal parts

== Geography ==
- 48th meridian east, a line of longitude
- 48th meridian west, a line of longitude
- 48th parallel north, a circle of latitude
- 48th parallel south, a circle of latitude
- 48th Street (disambiguation)

== Military ==
- 48th Army
- 48th Battalion (disambiguation)
- 48th Brigade (disambiguation)
- 48th Division (disambiguation)
- 48th Regiment (disambiguation)
- 48th Squadron (disambiguation)

== Other ==
- 48th century
- 48th century BC

== See also ==
- 48 (disambiguation)
- Forty-eighters (disambiguation)
