= 44th Arkansas Infantry (Mounted) =

- Active: 1864-1865
- Country: Confederate States
- Allegiance: Arkansas
- Branch: Army
- Type: Infantry
- Size: Regiment
- Facings: Light blue
- Engagements: Price's Missouri Raid, Battle of Fort Davidson Fourth Battle of Boonville Battle of Glasgow, Missouri Battle of Sedalia Second Battle of Lexington Battle of Little Blue River Second Battle of Independence Battle of Byram's Ford Battle of Westport Battle of Marais des Cygnes, Battle of Mine Creek Battle of Marmiton River Second Battle of Newtonia

The 44th Arkansas Infantry (Mounted) (1864–1865) was a Confederate Army Mounted Infantry regiment during the American Civil War. While authorized by the State Military Board as an infantry regiment, the unit was mounted for Price's Missouri Expedition and was officially designated as mounted infantry, but this designation was almost never used by the unit. When a numerical designation is used, the unit is sometimes referred to as the 29th Arkansas Cavalry Regiment. The unit is most often referred as McGehee's Arkansas Cavalry Regiment for its commander, James H. McGehee. McGehee is often spelled McGhee in the Official Records of the Union and Confederate Armies.

== Organization ==
The exact date of organization of the 44th Arkansas Mounted infantry remains obscure. Some sources state that the unit was organized in the fall of 1863, but it is likely that the unit was organized during the summer of 1864 along with the 45th through the 48th Mounted Infantry Regiments.

It is known that James H. McGehee began his military service in a volunteer militia company organized in the 30th Arkansas Militia Regiment in Crittenden County, Arkansas in April 1861. The Crittenden Rangers became Company C of the 6th Arkansas Cavalry Battalion, which was eventually expanded to a full regiment and designated the 2nd Arkansas Cavalry Regiment (Slemons's).

It is unclear how long McGehee served with the 6th Battalion, but by January 1863 he was apparently a Captain commanding an unnamed, unattached company of cavalry which was operating along the Mississippi River, north of Memphis Tennessee. Captain McGehee stated in his after action report that he was acting under orders to reconnoiter the area, "burning cotton in that country and annoying the enemy on the Mississippi River" wherever possible. McGehee's primary target in these operations was Union shipping along the river. McGehee and his men were responsible for burning at least two steam ships. On January 6, 1863 McGehee's troops captured and burned steamboat Jacob Musselman near Memphis, later they also intercepted and burned the steamer Grampus No. 2. The operations by McGehee led Union Official to make a raid and burn the homes of suspected bushwhackers in Mound City, and Hopefield Arkansas.

By September 1863, McGehee's Company had joined with other semi-independent companies under Colonel Archibald S. Dobbins to form Dobbins 1st Arkansas Cavalry Regiment. McGehee's Company became Company C, and probably remained with the regiment unit for the winter of 1863 when Colonel Dobbins was court-martialed and dismissed from the service because he refused to accept orders from General John S. Marmaduke because Marmaduke had killed Brigadier General L. M. Walker in a duel just before the Battle of Little Rock. The official records indicate that the regiment was broken up about January 3, 1864, and elements of the regiment were attached to, but not formally consolidated with, Col. Thomas J. Morgan's regiment. It may be that this is the point at which McGehee began organizing his own regiment.

In May 1864, General J. O. Shelby occupied northeast Arkansas, well behind Union Army lines. In early June 1864, General Shelby commissioned several officers to begin raising regiments in Northeast Arkansas. By June 13, Shelby reported to General Sterling Price that recruiting efforts were bearing fruit.

The decreasing availability of fodder for horses in 1864 led the Confederate Trans-Mississippi Department to issue an order proscribing the raising of additional mounted regiments in Arkansas. However, when General Sterling Price received authorization to conduct a campaign in Missouri that fall, several of the new regiments were mounted in order to accompany him. As a result, the 44th, 45th, 46th, 47th, and 48th were officially mounted infantry regiments instead of cavalry regiments. They were rarely referred to in contemporary reports and orders by numerical designation. Price referred to them as McGehee's Cavalry, Crabtree's Cavalry, etc., which eventually resulted in their later being referred to as 44th Cavalry, 46th Cavalry, etc.

The unit was composed of companies from the following counties:

Company A, Commanded by Captain I. N. Deadrick, organized at Vandale, in Cross, Arkansas.

Company B, Commanded by Captain Thomas P. Wilson, organized in Woodruff County, Arkansas.

Company C, Commanded by Captain W. B. Ward, organized in Independence County, Arkansas.

Company D, Commanded by First Lieutenant S. J. Leonard organized in Poinsett County, Arkansas.

Company E, Commanded by Captain J. M. Levesque, organized in Poinsett County, Arkansas.

Company F, Commanded by Captain F. Simmions.

Company G, Commanded by Captain Christopher Y. Steen, organized in Jacksonport, Jackson County, Arkansas.

Company H, Commanded by First Lieutenant William White, organized in White County Arkansas.

Company I, Commanded by Second Lieutenant J. W. Patterson, organized at Taylor's Creek in St. Francis County, Arkansas.

Officer appointments in the 40-series regiments date from the June to August 1864 timeframe, so it is assumed that the regiments were mustered into service about the same time at various points in northeast Arkansas. The list of regimental officers follows:

- McGehee, J.H. - Colonel Commanding
- Grider, Jesse S -. Lieutenant Colonel
- Matthees, Teel - Assistant Quartermaster
- Allen, C.M. - First Lieutenant, Adjutant
- Chunn, Thomas D. - Surgeon
- Sparks, J.S. - Hospital Steward

There are no known muster rolls of the 44th Arkansas Mounted Infantry and no record of enlistments. Apart from a few prisoner of war records, the records of this regiment consist of paroles of soldiers who surrendered at Jacksonport, Arkansas on June 5, 1865.

== Service ==
The 44th was assigned to Colonel Dobbins brigade, of Maj. Gen. James F. Fagan's division, of Sterling Price's Army of Missouri, for Price's Missouri Expedition (commonly referred to as Price's Raid).

Price's Missouri Raid, Arkansas-Missouri-Kansas, September–October, 1864
Battle of Fort Davidson (September 27, 1864)
Fourth Battle of Boonville (October 11)
Battle of Glasgow, Missouri (October 15)
Battle of Sedalia (October 15)
Second Battle of Lexington (October 19)
Battle of Little Blue River (October 21)
Second Battle of Independence (October 21–22)
Battle of Byram's Ford (October 22–23)
Battle of Westport (October 23)
Battle of Marais des Cygnes, Linn County, Kansas, (October 25)
Battle of Mine Creek (October 25)
Battle of Marmiton River (October 25)
Second Battle of Newtonia (October 28)

The most fierce fighting that the 44th was engaged in during the raid occurred on October 23 at the Battle of Westport. Union General Blunt's position at the Wornall House was formidable. His three brigades occupied positions behind a stone wall, some three hundred yards in front of the Confederate line. A wide road, bordered on either side by stone walls, led to a farm house on top of a hill. In the road just over the hill there was a gun section of McLain's Colorado Battery in position and firing into the Confederate troops at the bottom of the hill. As the Confederate lines were reforming and being placed in position by Brigadier General Jo Shelby, Major General Fagan rode up at the head of his escort. Fagan looked at the battery a moment through his field glasses and said: "Shelby, I propose to take that battery. Have a regiment of cavalry to form in platoons and charge up the line and support the charge on foot." Colonel McGehee, commanding the 44th Arkansas, about three hundred strong, formed by platoons, which filled the lane with a living mass of cavalry. As the 44th Arkansas charged up the lane, Lieutenant Colonel Samuel Walker led the 16th Kansas Cavalry and 2nd Colorado Cavalry against Colonel McGehee. Two squadrons of the 2nd Colorado under Green also struck the column's left. The 16th Kansas met them in the road, meanwhile Company E of the 15th Kansas Cavalry, struck across the field and reached the lower end of the lane, thus hemming in McGehee's troopers and intercepting any retreat.

One of the few instances of individual combat between opposing commanders during the war occurred during the charge of the 44th Arkansas on McLain's Colorado Battery. Colonel McGhee encountered Captain Curtis Johnson, commanding Company E, 15th Kansas Cavalry. Both men pulled revolvers and charged toward one another, and both were wounded. Captain Johnson was shot in the arm. Colonel McGhee was listed as having been killed in a report filled by Colonel Charles R. Jennison of the 15th Kansas Cavalry, but this report proved to be false. Colonel McGhee was wounded a second time two days later at the Battle of Mine Creek, and he was forced to relinquish command to Lieutenant Colonel Jesse S. Grider, but McGhee survived the wounds and the war, living in Arkansas until at least 1870.

Brigadier General M. Jeff Thompson observed the fight reported that the gallant charge had been a disaster for the men that made it. McGehee's attack resulted in the loss to the Confederates of thirty-five prisoners, nineteen dead and thirty-seven wounded.

After the completion of Price's raid, the 44th was furloughed to return to the area from which it was recruited in order to forage and recover absentees and to return to the army at a prescribed date.

At Boonsborough, on the suggestion of General Fagan, I detached two of his brigades (McCray's and Dobbin's), along with Freeman's brigade, of Marmaduke's division, to take the route to Northeast Arkansas, with instructions to collect all stragglers and deserters, and report south of the Arkansas River, at or near Washington, by the 15th, 20th, and 25th days of December, respectively

A scouting report made by Major Harris S. Greeno, of the 4th Arkansas Cavalry (U. S. Army), November 15, 1864, made from Devalls Bluff relayed information on the post raid condition of Fagan's Division of Arkansas Cavalry. Maj. Greeno's information came from deserters and captured Confederate soldiers who had served in Price's Army:

...of these two thirds of the men have deserted and they will never go out again. They have thrown away their arms and are nearly all at their homes. They are all greatly demoralized and discouraged...

== Surrender ==
Brigadier General M. Jeff Thompson, Commander of the Military Sub-District of Northeast Arkansas and Southeast Missouri, to which the 45th Arkansas was assigned at the close of the war, surrendered his command at Chalk Bluff, Arkansas on May 11, 1865, and agreed to have his men assemble at Wittsburg and Jacksonport, Arkansas to lay down their arms and receive their paroles. Thompson's command was widely dispersed throughout northeast Arkansas, more for reasons of available forage than anything else. About a third of his men refused to surrender. Shelby's Missouri Brigade, along with elements of Green's and Jackman's Missouri Brigades, lit out for Mexico. Some Missouri units disbanded rather than surrender their colors. Many men simply went home. The 45th Arkansas Cavalry surrendered with its command structure intact and was paroled at Jacksonport on June 5, 1865. At the time of the surrender, the regiment was assigned to the Military Sub-District of Northeast Arkansas and Southeast Missouri, commanded by Brigadier General M. Jeff. Thompson (Surrendered at Jacksonport), Dobbins' Brigade, commanded by Colonel Col. J. M. McGehee (Surrendered at Jacksonport), 44th Arkansas Mounted Infantry, commanded by Colonel James H. McGehee (Surrendered at Jacksonport).

== See also ==
- List of Confederate units from Arkansas
- Confederate Units by State

== Bibliography ==
- Castel, Albert. General Sterling Price and the Civil War in the West. Baton Rouge, Louisiana: Louisiana State University Press, 1968.
- Donat, P. "Fagan's Attack on Fayetteville." Flashback, 35, No. 4 (November 1985): 8-13.
- Feathers, Tom C. "The History of Military Activities in the Vicinity of Fayetteville Arkansas, Including the Battle of Fayetteville and the Siege of Fayetteville During the War Between the States." Washington County Flashback, 3 (April 1953): 2-33.
- Kerby, Robert L. Kirby Smith's Confederacy: The Trans-Mississippi South, 1863–1865. Tuscaloosa, Alabama: The University of Alabama Press, 1972.
- Morgan, James Logan. "A Brief History of the 45th Arkansas Cavalry Regiment, C.S.A." The Stream of History, Volume 16, Number 4 (Oct. 1978). Page 3.
- Mobley, Freeman. Making Sense of the Civil War in Batesville-Jacksonport and Northeast Arkansas, 1861-1874. Batesville, Arkansas: P.D. Printing, 2005.
- Monaghan, Jay. Swamp Fox of the Confederacy: The Life and Military Services of M. Jeff Thompson. Tuscaloosa, Alabama: Confederate Publishing Co., 1956.
- Monnett, Howard N. and Monnett, John H. Action before Westport, 1864. University Press of Colorado, 1964. ISBN 0-87081-413-3.
