= List of highways numbered 48 =

The following highways are numbered 48:

== Australia ==
- Illawarra Highway

== Canada ==
- Alberta Highway 48
- Ontario Highway 48
- Saskatchewan Highway 48

== Czech Republic ==
- D48 motorway (Czech Republic) part of European route E462
- I/48; Czech: Silnice I/48

== Greece ==
- EO48 road

== Hungary ==
- Main road 48 (Hungary)

== India ==
- National Highway 48 (India)

== Iran ==
- Road 48

== Italy ==
- State road 48

== Japan ==
- Japan National Route 48

== Korea, South ==
- National Route 48

== New Zealand ==
- New Zealand State Highway 48

== United Kingdom ==
- British A48 (Highnam-Carmarthen)
- British M48 (Olveston-Magor)

== United States ==
- U.S. Route 48
  - U.S. Route 48 (1926) (former)
  - U.S. Route 48 (1965-1991) (former)
- Alabama State Route 48
  - County Route 48 (Lee County, Alabama)
- Arkansas Highway 48
- California State Route 48
- Delaware Route 48
- Florida State Road 48
  - County Road 48 (Citrus County, Florida)
  - County Road 48 (Sumter County, Florida)
- Georgia State Route 48
- Idaho State Highway 48
- Illinois Route 48
- Indiana State Road 48
- Iowa Highway 48
- Kentucky Route 48
- Louisiana Highway 48
- Maryland Route 48 (former)
- M-48 (Michigan highway)
- Minnesota State Highway 48
  - County Road 48 (Ramsey County, Minnesota)
  - County Road 48 (St. Louis County, Minnesota)
- Mississippi Highway 48
- Missouri Route 48
- Montana Highway 48
- Nebraska Highway 48 (former)
  - Nebraska Recreation Road 48B
- Nevada State Route 48
- New Jersey Route 48
  - County Route 48 (Bergen County, New Jersey)
  - County Route S48 (Bergen County, New Jersey)
  - County Route 48 (Monmouth County, New Jersey)
- New Mexico State Road 48
- New York State Route 48
  - County Route 48 (Allegany County, New York)
  - County Route 48 (Broome County, New York)
  - County Route 48 (Cayuga County, New York)
  - County Route 48 (Chautauqua County, New York)
  - County Route 48 (Chemung County, New York)
  - County Route 48 (Dutchess County, New York)
  - County Route 48 (Essex County, New York)
  - County Route 48 (Franklin County, New York)
  - County Route 48 (Genesee County, New York)
  - County Route 48 (Orange County, New York)
  - County Route 48 (Otsego County, New York)
  - County Route 48 (Putnam County, New York)
  - County Route 48 (Rensselaer County, New York)
  - County Route 48 (Schenectady County, New York)
  - County Route 48 (St. Lawrence County, New York)
  - County Route 48 (Suffolk County, New York)
  - County Route 48 (Sullivan County, New York)
  - County Route 48 (Warren County, New York)
  - County Route 48 (Washington County, New York)
- North Carolina Highway 48
- North Dakota Highway 48
- Ohio State Route 48
- Oklahoma State Highway 48
- Pennsylvania Route 48
- South Carolina Highway 48
- South Dakota Highway 48
- Tennessee State Route 48
- Texas State Highway 48
  - Texas State Highway Loop 48
  - Farm to Market Road 48
  - Texas Park Road 48
- Utah State Route 48
- Virginia State Route 48
  - Virginia State Route 48 (1928-1934) (former)
- West Virginia Route 48 (1920s) (former)
- Wisconsin Highway 48

== See also ==
- List of highways numbered 48A
- A48 (disambiguation)

| Preceded by 47 | Lists of highways 48 | Succeeded by 49 |
