= List of highways numbered 49 =

The following highways are numbered 49:

== Australia ==
- Queensland State Route 49
  - Wide Bay Highway
  - Bunya Highway
  - Moonie Highway
  - Balonne Highway
- Central Coast Highway

== Canada ==
- Alberta Highway 49
- British Columbia Highway 49
- Manitoba Highway 49
- Highway 49 (Ontario)
- Saskatchewan Highway 49

== Czech Republic ==
- D49 Motorway
- I/49 Highway; Czech: Silnice I/49

== Hungary ==
- M49 expressway

== India ==
- National Highway 49 (India)

== Iran ==
- Road 49

== Japan ==
- Japan National Route 49

== Korea, South ==
- Gukjido 49

== Namibia ==
- C49 road (Namibia)

== New Zealand ==
- New Zealand State Highway 49

== United Kingdom ==
- British A49 (Ross on Wye-Bamber Bridge)
- British M49 (Severn Beach-Avonmouth)

== United States ==
- Interstate 49
- U.S. Route 49
- Alabama State Route 49
- Arkansas Highway 49 (1926-1963) (former)
- California State Route 49
- Colorado State Highway 49 (1967-1968) (former)
- Connecticut Route 49
- Florida State Road 49
  - County Road 49 (Suwannee County, Florida)
- Georgia State Route 49
- Idaho State Highway 49 (1930s) (former)
- Illinois Route 49
- Indiana State Road 49
- Iowa Highway 49 (former)
- K-49 (Kansas highway)
- Kentucky Route 49
- Louisiana Highway 49
- Maryland Route 49
- Massachusetts Route 49
- M-49 (Michigan highway)
- Minnesota State Highway 49 (former)
  - County Road 49 (Ramsey County, Minnesota)
- Missouri Route 49
- Montana Highway 49
- Nebraska Highway 49 (former)
  - Nebraska Spur 49A
  - Nebraska Spur 49B
  - Nebraska Spur 49C
- Nevada State Route 49 (former)
- New Hampshire Route 49
- New Jersey Route 49
  - County Route 49 (Bergen County, New Jersey)
    - County Route S49 (Bergen County, New Jersey)
  - County Route 49 (Monmouth County, New Jersey)
  - County Route 49 (Ocean County, New Jersey)
- New York State Route 49
  - County Route 49 (Allegany County, New York)
  - County Route 49 (Cattaraugus County, New York)
  - County Route 49 (Chautauqua County, New York)
  - County Route 49 (Dutchess County, New York)
  - County Route 49 (Erie County, New York)
  - County Route 49 (Essex County, New York)
  - County Route 49 (Genesee County, New York)
  - County Route 49 (Orleans County, New York)
  - County Route 49 (Otsego County, New York)
  - County Route 49 (Putnam County, New York)
  - County Route 49 (Rensselaer County, New York)
  - County Route 49 (Rockland County, New York)
  - County Route 49 (Schenectady County, New York)
  - County Route 49 (St. Lawrence County, New York)
  - County Route 49 (Suffolk County, New York)
  - County Route 49 (Sullivan County, New York)
  - County Route 49 (Washington County, New York)
- North Carolina Highway 49
- North Dakota Highway 49
- Ohio State Route 49
- Oklahoma State Highway 49
- Pennsylvania Route 49
- South Carolina Highway 49
- South Dakota Highway 49
- Tennessee State Route 49
- Texas State Highway 49
  - Texas State Highway Loop 49
  - Texas State Highway Spur 49 (former)
  - Farm to Market Road 49
  - Texas Park Road 49
- Utah State Route 49 (former)
- Virginia State Route 49
- West Virginia Route 49
  - West Virginia Route 49 (1920s) (former)
- Wisconsin Highway 49

== See also ==
- A49 (disambiguation)

Preceded by 48	Lists of highways 49	Succeeded by 50
