= 48 =

48 may refer to:

- 48 (number), the natural number following 47 and preceding 49
- one of the years 48 BC, AD 48, 1948, 2048
- '48 (novel)
- '48 (magazine)
- "48", a song by Tyler, the Creator from the album Wolf
- 48, a phone network brand of Three Ireland
- "Forty Eight", a song by Karma to Burn from the album V, 2011
- 48 Doris, a main-belt asteroid
- Tucker 48, a sedan

== See also ==
- 48th (disambiguation)
- A48 (disambiguation)
