= 1st Arkansas Cavalry Regiment (Confederate) =

Cavalry regiment of the Confederate States Army

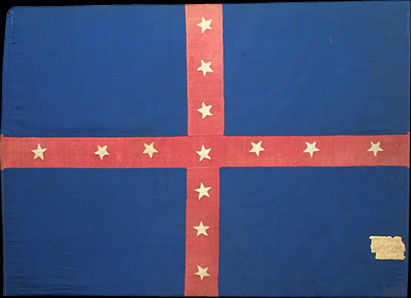
- Regimental standard of Dobbins' regiment at the Old State House Museum in Little Rock, Arkansas
- Active: 1863–1865
- Disbanded: May 26, 1865
- Country: Confederate States
- Allegiance: Arkansas
- Branch: Army
- Type: Cavalry
- Size: Regiment
- Nickname: "Dobbins' regiment"
- Facings: Yellow
- Battles: American Civil War; Battle of Helena; Battle of Bayou Fourche; Battle of Pine Bluff; Battle of Fort Davidson; Fourth Battle of Boonville; Battle of Glasgow, Missouri; Battle of Sedalia; Second Battle of Lexington; Battle of Little Blue River; Second Battle of Independence; Battle of Byram's Ford; Battle of Westport; Battle of Marais des Cygnes; Battle of Mine Creek; Battle of Marmiton River; Second Battle of Newtonia

Commanders
- Commanding Officer: Col. Archibald S. Dobbins

The 1st Arkansas Cavalry Regiment, also known as "Dobbins' regiment", was a cavalry formation of the Confederate States Army in the Trans-Mississippi Theater of the American Civil War commanded by Colonel Archibald S. Dobbins.

== Regimental order of battle ==
Units of Dobbins' regiment included:

- Company A – Capt. Samuel Corley, of Phillips County. Formerly known as Corley's Company, Chrisman's Battalion:
- Company B – Capt. Rufus D. Anderson of Phillips County. Formerly known as Anderson's Company.
- Company C – Capt. James H. McGehee of St. Francis County. Formerly known as McGhees Company,
- Company D – Capt. George W. Rutherford of Independence County. Formerly known as Rutherford's Company.
- Company E – Capt. Morgan M. Bateman of Jackson County. Also known as Bateman's Company.
- Company F – Capt. Robert C. Nall of St. Francis County.
- Company G – Capt. James F. Barton of Crittenden County. Also known as Barton's Company.
- Company H – Capt. William R. Coody of Woodruff County.
- Company I – Capt. John T. West of Independence County.
- Company K – Capt. William Weatherly of Phillips County.

Company F was consolidated with Company A on January 3, 1864.

Companies D & H were consolidated with Company E on January 3, 1864.

The original regimental staff officers were:

- Colonel Archibald S. Dobbins
- Lieutenant Colonel F. M. Chrisman
- Major Samuel Corley

A court martial resulted in Colonel Dobbins' refusal to accept orders from General John S. Marmaduke because Marmaduke had killed Brigadier General L. M. Walker in a duel just before the Battle of Little Rock.

== Battles ==
Dobbins' regiment was engaged in the following battles:

- Battle of Helena, Arkansas July 4, 1863
- Battle of Bayou Fourche September 10, 1863
- Battle of Pine Bluff, Arkansas, October 25, 1863
- Battle of Fort Davidson, Missouri, September 27, 1864
- Fourth Battle of Boonville, Missouri, October 11, 1864
- Battle of Glasgow, Missouri, October 15, 1864
- Battle of Sedalia, Missouri, October 15, 1864
- Second Battle of Lexington, Missouri, October 19, 1864
- Battle of Little Blue River, Missouri, October 21, 1864
- Second Battle of Independence, Missouri, October 21–22, 1864
- Battle of Byram's Ford, Missouri, October 22–23, 1864
- Battle of Westport, Missouri, October 23, 1864
- Battle of Marais des Cygnes, Linn County, Kansas, October 25, 1864
- Battle of Mine Creek, Missouri, October 25, 1864
- Battle of Marmiton River, Missouri, October 25, 1864
- Second Battle of Newtonia, Missouri, October 28, 1864

== Regimental color ==
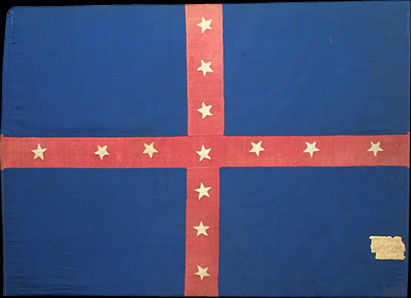
Regimental color captured near Tulip, Arkansas, on October 12, 1863.

Dobbins' regimental color was captured by Indiana cavalry near Tulip, Arkansas, in October 1863. Colonel Powell Clayton with three hundred and fifty men the 1st Indiana Cavalry and four pieces of light artillery, making a circuitous route, marching ninety miles in thirty-three hours, succeeded in surprising and completely routing Colonel Dobbins' cavalry brigade at Tulip, Arkansas, capturing one stand of colors, all his camp and garrison equipage, quartermaster and commissary stores, medical supplies, transportation, etc.

The regimental color is currently located in the collections of the Old State House Museum in Little Rock, Arkansas. It flag measures 53" x 72". It is blue and has a red cross. It has 13 stars. The flag is sometimes referred to as a Polk Pattern flag after the flag used by General Leonidas Polk's Corps east of the Mississippi River.

== See also ==
- List of Confederate units from Arkansas

== Bibliography ==
- Dedmondt, Glenn. "The Flags Of Civil War Arkansas" (Pelican Publishing Co., 2009). page 106. ISBN 978-1-58980-190-5
- Maxfield, T. "George W. Rutherford's Company C, 1st Arkansas Cavalry." (Prepared by N. Britton.) Independence County Chronicle, 25, No. 3/4 (April–July 1984): 33-35.
