= The Last Hurrah: Sterling Price's Missouri Expedition of 1864 =

Book by Kyle Sinisi

- Cover of the book
- Author: Kyle Sinisi
- Cover artist: Andy Thomas
- Language: English
- Subject: Price's Missouri Expedition
- Genre: Non-fiction
- Publisher: Rowman & Littlefield
- Publication date: 2015
- Publication place: United States
- Pages: 432
- ISBN: 978-0-7425-4535-9

The Last Hurrah: Sterling Price's Missouri Expedition of 1864 is a 2015 book written by Kyle Sinisi and published by Rowman & Littlefield about Price's Missouri Expedition, an 1864 campaign of the American Civil War that failed to wrest control of the state of Missouri from the Union. Sinisi focused on the military expedition itself, but also covered political machinations that occurred during the expedition as well as topography and logistics. The Last Hurrah posits that the campaign should not be viewed as a raid due to its magnitude, that the Battle of Mine Creek had elements of a massacre, and that Missouri did not want to give up Union control. Reviewers praised the work, especially its ability to cover the campaign comprehensively while also discussing factors such as politics and the effects of guerrilla warfare.

== Content ==
The Last Hurrah was written by Kyle Sinisi and published by Rowman & Littlefield in 2015. It is part of a series of books published by Rowman & Littlefield about the war titled "The American Crisis: Books on the Civil War Era". Sinisi is a veteran of the United States Army who received a Ph.D. in history from Kansas State University. He primarily researches the political and military history of the United States, especially the American Civil War and the Gilded Era. He is a professor at The Citadel, a military college in South Carolina. The book is about Price's Missouri Expedition, an 1864 campaign of the American Civil War in which Confederate States Army troops led by general Sterling Price invaded the state of Missouri. The expedition saw the Confederates enter Missouri in hopes of capturing the city of St. Louis, gathering supplies, and creating a popular revolt against Union control of the state. Strong Union positions led Price to not attack St. Louis or the state capital of Jefferson City, and the Confederates moved westwards across the state until they were defeated at the Battle of Westport in October. Price and his men then retreated south into Texas, having lost over two-thirds of the soldiers who entered the state.

According to reviewer Wesley Moody for the Arkansas Historical Quarterly, the campaign has been historically understudied, and Sinisi's work has been described as a comprehensive treatment of it. While the primary focus of the book is about Price's men's trek across Missouri, it also discusses the effects political battles in the state of Kansas had on the campaign. Sinisi posits that the campaign should not be considered an ordinary raid, as the magnitude of Price's invasion was greater than that of other cavalry actions during the American Civil War. The Last Hurrah attributes the eventual defeat of the Confederate expedition to logistics issues, Price's leadership, and that Missouri "ultimately did not want to be liberated". Sinisi describes the effects of topography and logistics in the work, including noting that the logistical issues inherent to the campaign rendered it essentially doomed from the start.

Sinisi drew from a variety of sources, including letters, newspapers, and postwar writings, as well as secondary sources. The book provides different casualty figures than those traditionally reported for the action, as those provided in prior studies were too high for several battles. He also compares the results of the expedition and prior guerrilla warfare to the effects of total war, and contends that the Battle of Mine Creek had hallmarks of a massacre, rather than a battle. The book also reexamines estimates of the size of the wagon train Price brought with his army and Price's mindsets for holding onto the train. The Last Hurrah is illustrated with maps and has an extensive bibliography. The book's front cover features the painting Shelby and His Men at Westport by Andy Thomas.

== Reception ==
Jeremy Neely, reviewing for Kansas History, opined that the book's greatest strength was its coverage of Price's retreat through parts of Kansas and Missouri after the Battle of Westport. Comparing it to prior histories of the campaign, Neely referred to The Last Hurrah as "a model of military history" and praised the book's maps, stating that Sinisi "fulfill[ed] his purpose admirably" in creating a comprehensive history of the campaign. Aaron Astor, writing for Civil War Book Review, noted that Sinisi was able to keep focus on the operations of the campaign, while still discussing political factors, guerrilla warfare, and the effects on civilian life. Astor also stated that Sinisi was able to clear through the large number of self-justifications provided by campaign participants after the end of the war. He also noted that The Last Hurrah raised the question of "why Missouri did not want to be liberated in 1864", but stated that the question was outside of the scope of Sinisi's work and highlighted a gap in the existing literature.

Thomas F. Curran, reviewing in the Journal of Southern History, noted the degree of detail present in Sinisi's study, stating that it sometimes broke down the campaign to "hour by hour and minute by minute". He also praised the work's treatment of the political relationships and problems between the leaders on both sides of the war. Moody described The Last Hurrah as "well-written, informative, and complete" and stated that the book was more holistic than the standard military history work. Wallace Dean Draper, reviewing for the Journal of the Illinois State Historical Society, noted that Sinisi's prose was readable, but could be dense for those unfamiliar with the subject matter. Draper praised Sinisi's use of primary sources, interpretations of associated military actions, and his ability to place the campaign in its proper context.

== Sources ==
- Astor, Aaron (Spring 2016). "The Last Hurrah: Sterling Price's Missouri Expedition of 1864". Civil War Book Review. 18 (2). doi:10.31390/cwbr.18.2.06.
- Curran, Thomas F. (November 2016). "The Last Hurrah: Sterling Price's Missouri Expedition of 1864". Journal of Southern History. 82 (4): 940–941. doi:10.1353/soh.2016.0278. ISSN 0022-4642. S2CID 164792353.
- Draper, Walter Dean (Winter 2018). "Reviewed Work: The Last Hurrah: Sterling Price's Missouri Expedition of 1864". Journal of the Illinois State Historical Society. 111 (4): 126–127. doi:10.5406/jillistathistsoc.111.4.0126. JSTOR 10.5406/jillistathistsoc.111.4.0126.
- Kennedy, Frances H., ed. (1998). The Civil War Battlefield Guide (2nd ed.). Boston/New York: Houghton Mifflin. ISBN 978-0-395-74012-5.
- Moody, Wesley (Winter 2015). "The Last Hurrah: Sterling Price's Missouri Expedition of 1864". Arkansas Historical Quarterly. 74 (4): 401–402. ISSN 0004-1823. ProQuest 1774581453.
- Neely, Jeremy (Autumn 2016). "The Last Hurrah: Sterling Price's Missouri Expedition of 1864" (PDF). Kansas History. 39 (3): 209. ISSN 0149-9114.
- Sinisi, Kyle S. (2020) [2015]. The Last Hurrah: Sterling Price's Missouri Expedition of 1864 (paperback ed.). Lanham, Maryland: Rowman & Littlefield. ISBN 978-1-5381-4151-9.
