= Tulip Cemetery =

Historic cemetery in Arkansas, United States

- U.S. National Register of Historic Places
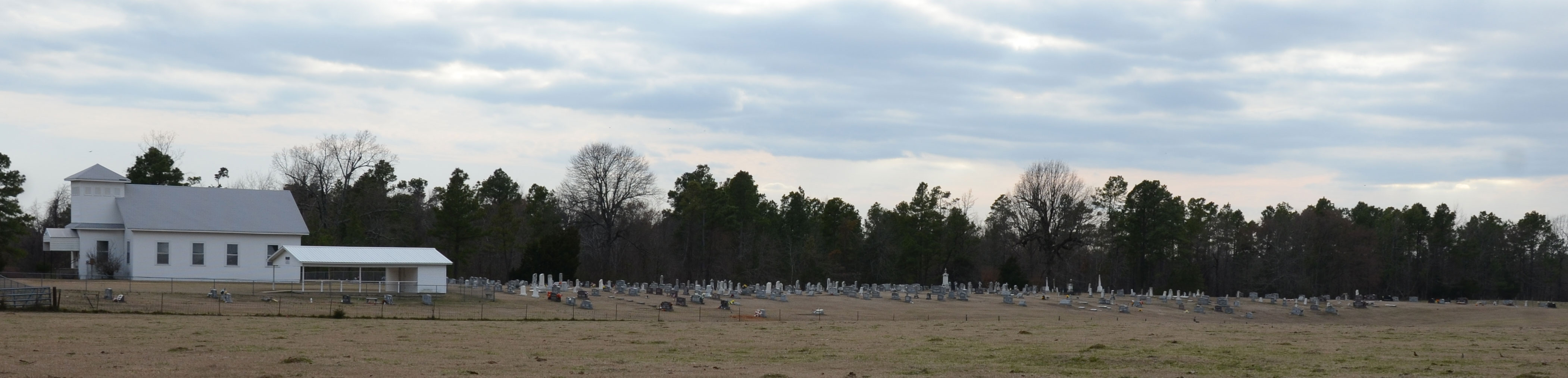
- Tulip Cemetery, showing the full extent. Graves begin near the road in front of the pavilion on the left edge of the photograph, and continue all the way to the right edge of the image.

- Location within Arkansas Location within the United States
- Location: Off AR 9, Tulip, Arkansas
- Coordinates: 34°4′40″N 92°39′28″W
- Area: 2.7 acres (1.1 ha)
- Built: 1842
- MPS: Dallas County MRA
- NRHP reference No.: 83003543
- Added to NRHP: October 28, 1983

Tulip Cemetery is a historic cemetery in Tulip, a small hamlet in rural Dallas County, Arkansas. It is located off Arkansas Highway 9, just behind the Tulip Methodist Church, occupying a high spot in the area. Tulip was one of the first settlements in Dallas County; the cemetery's oldest documented grave dates to 1847. It also includes the graves of six Confederate Army soldiers.

The cemetery was listed on the National Register of Historic Places in 1983.

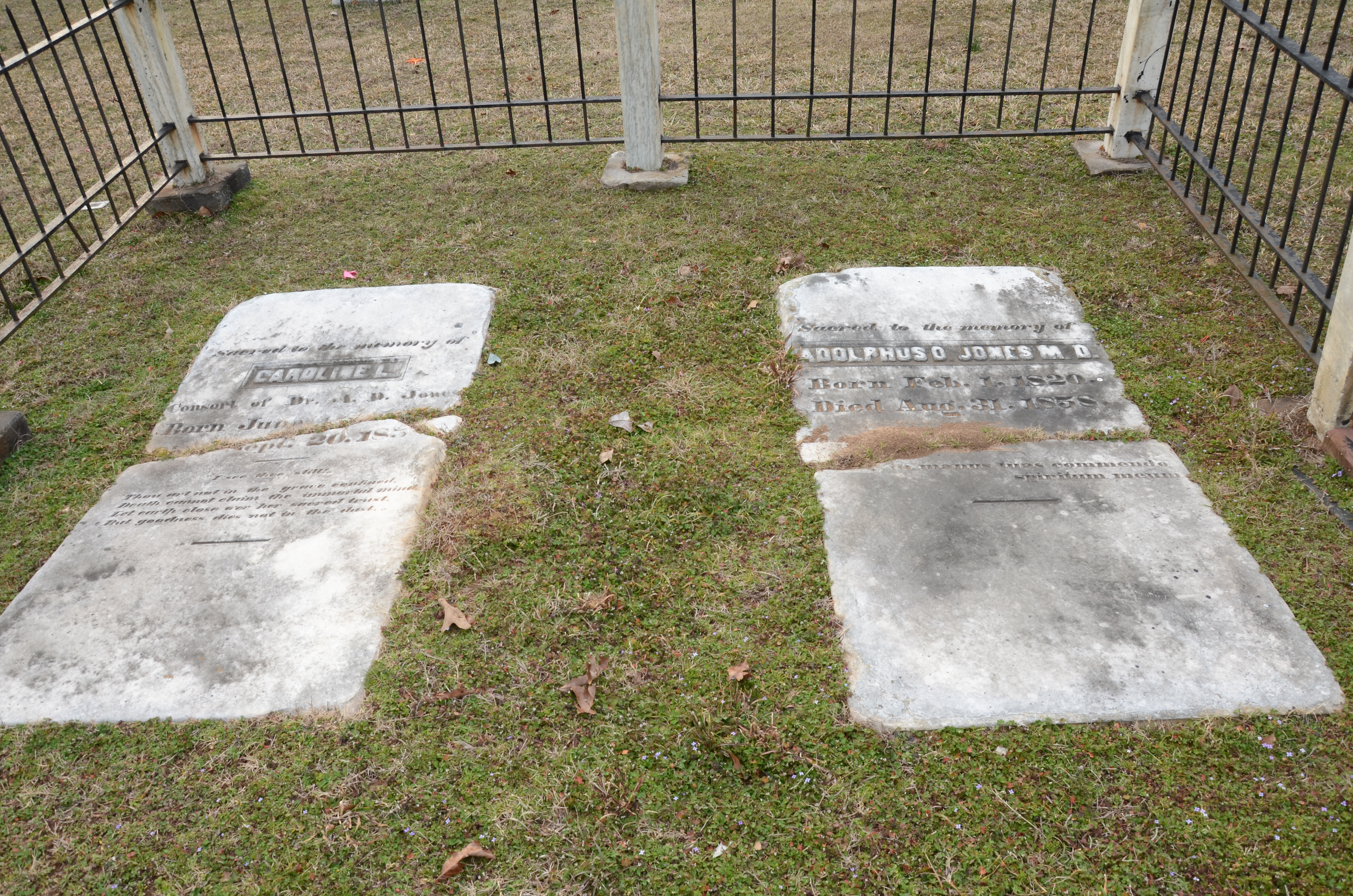
Headstones at cemetery

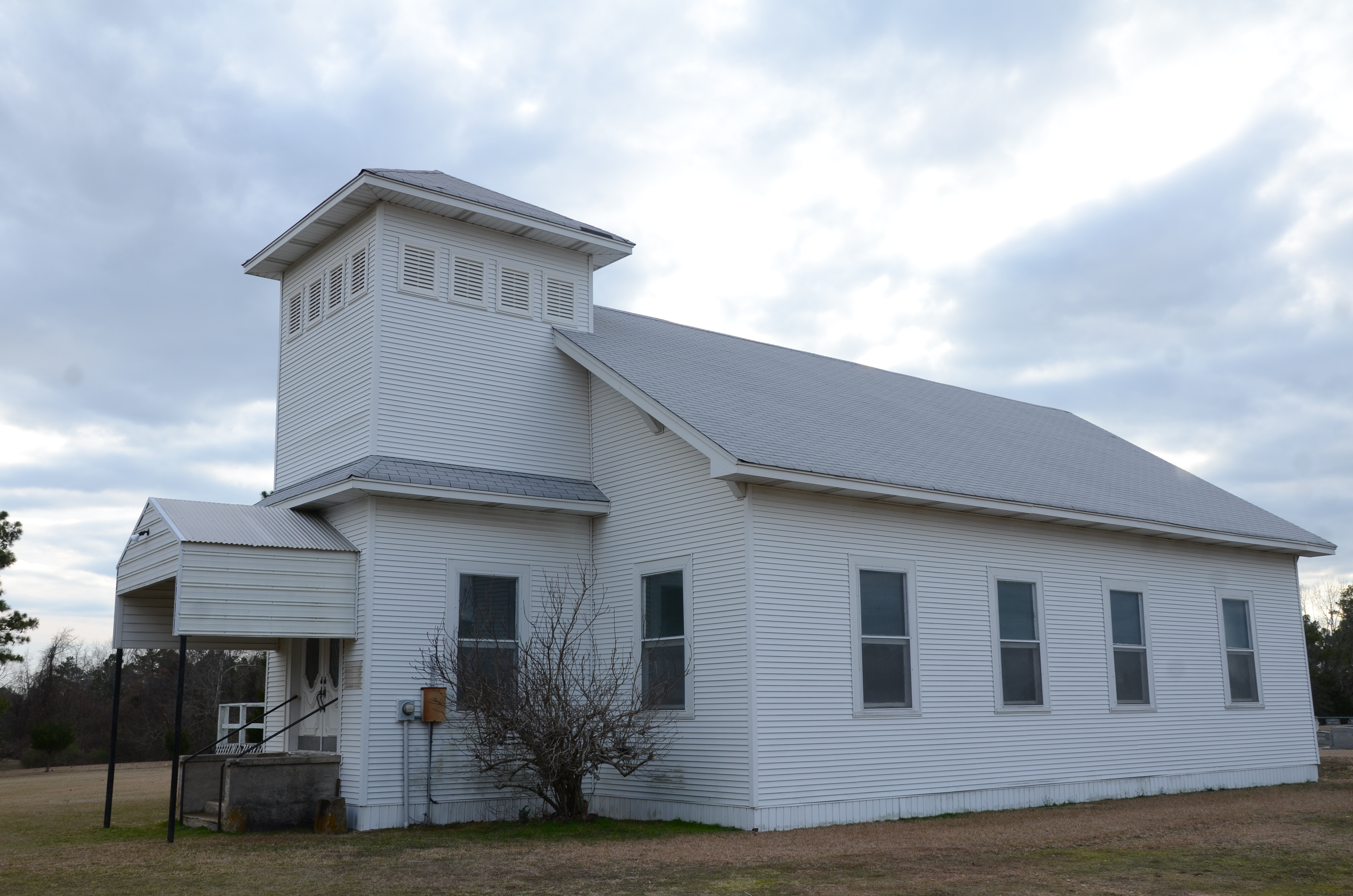
Tulip Cemetery Church

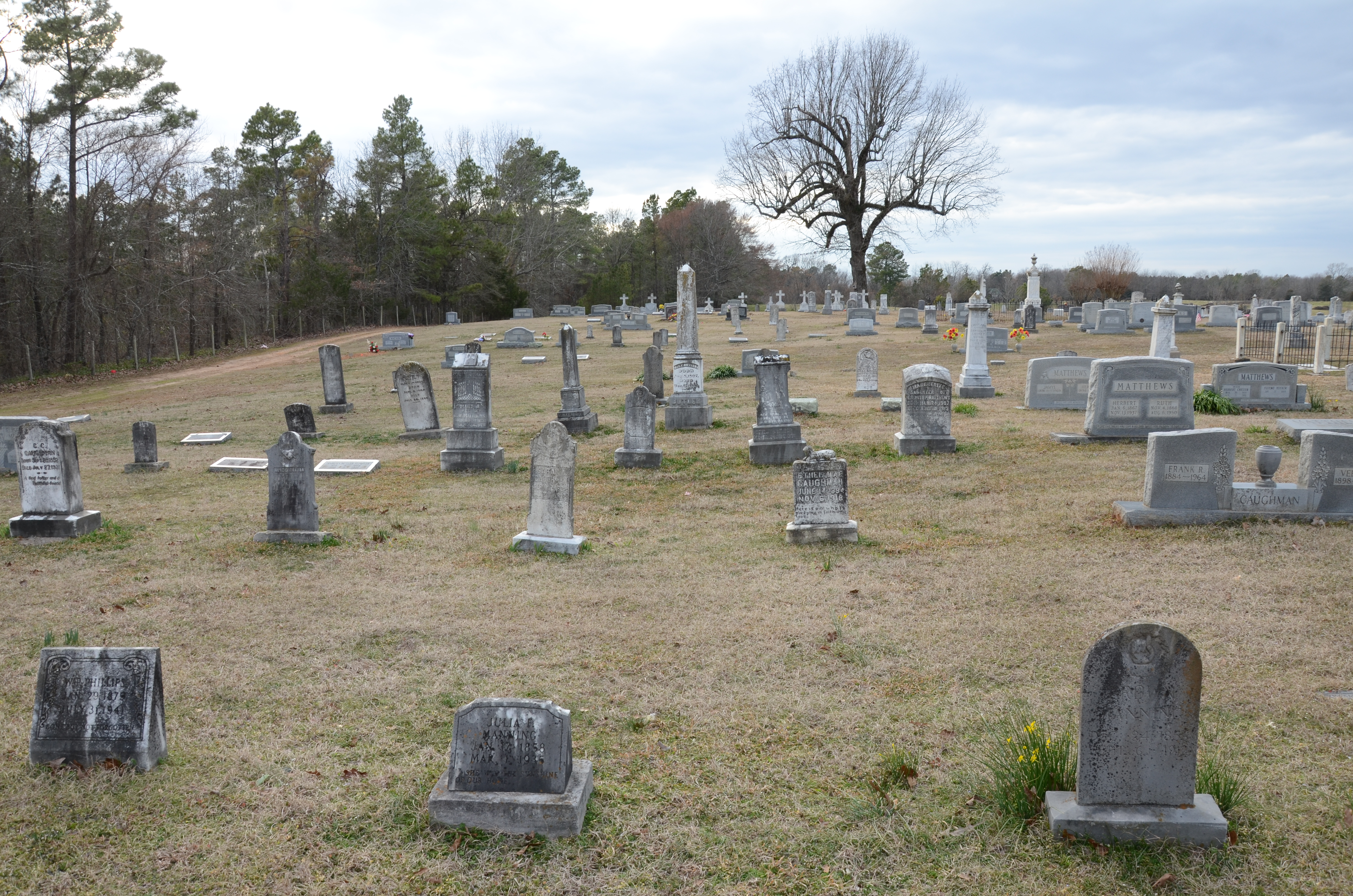
Field of headstones

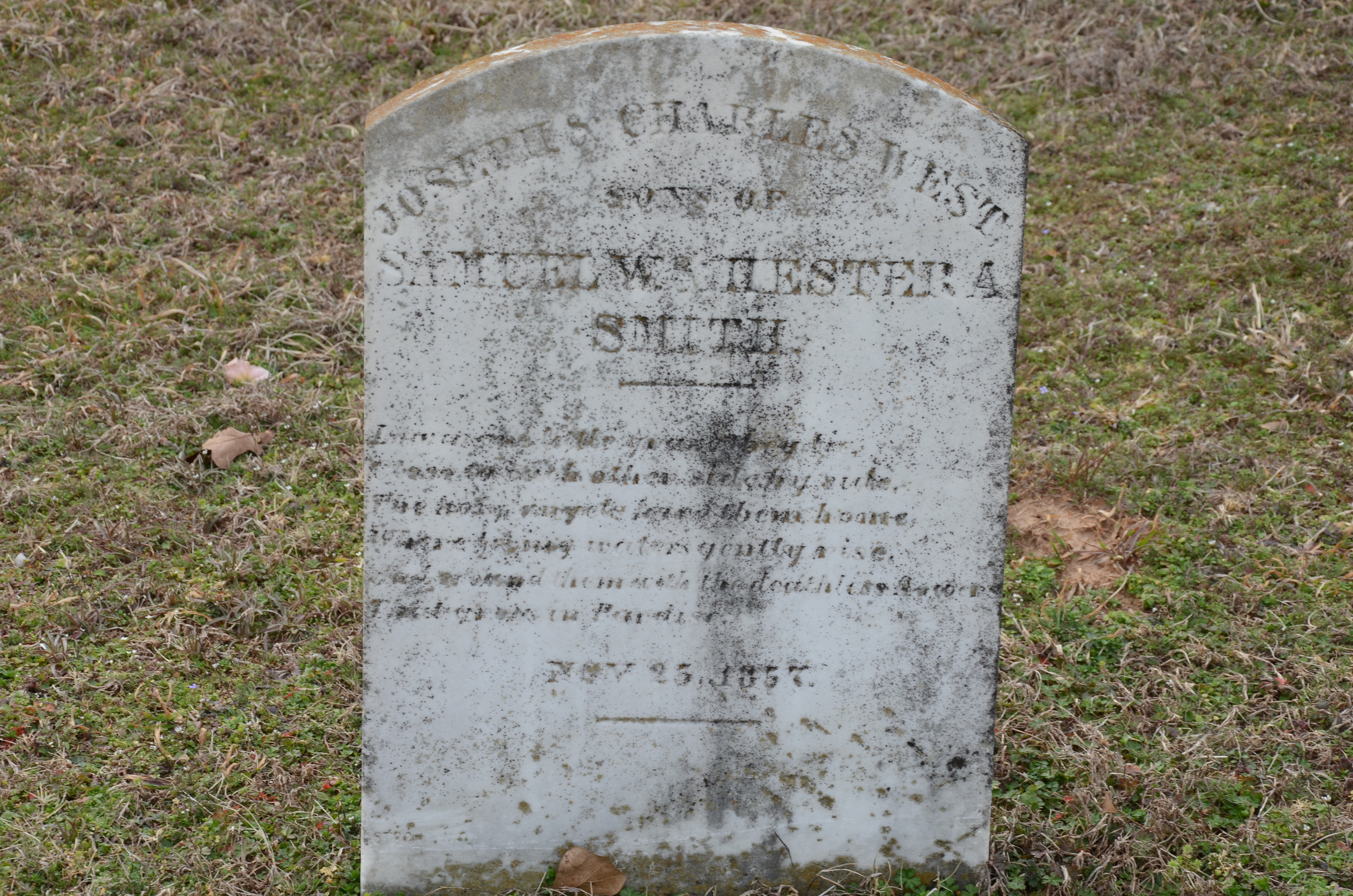
Headstone from 1857

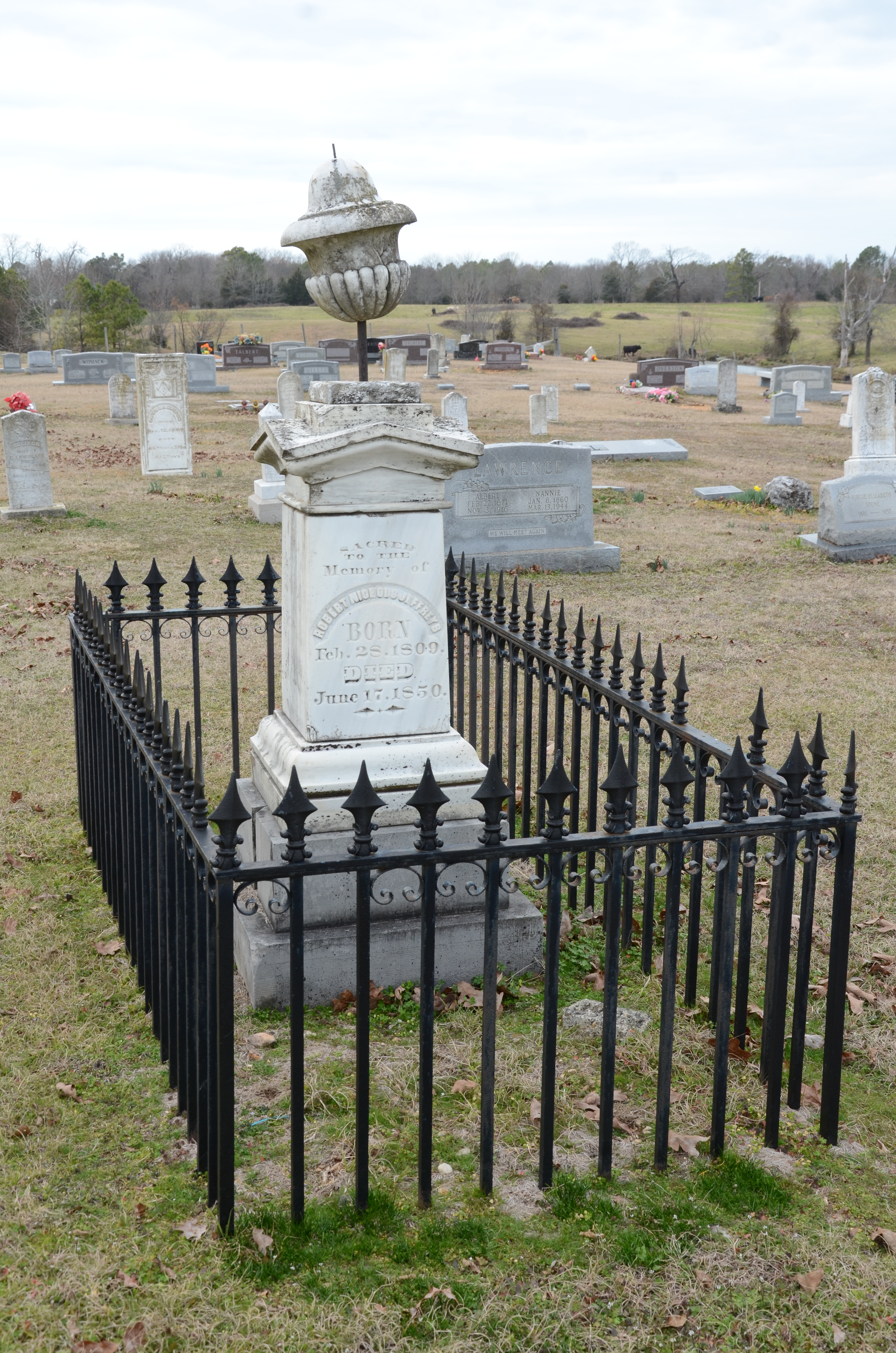
Headstone

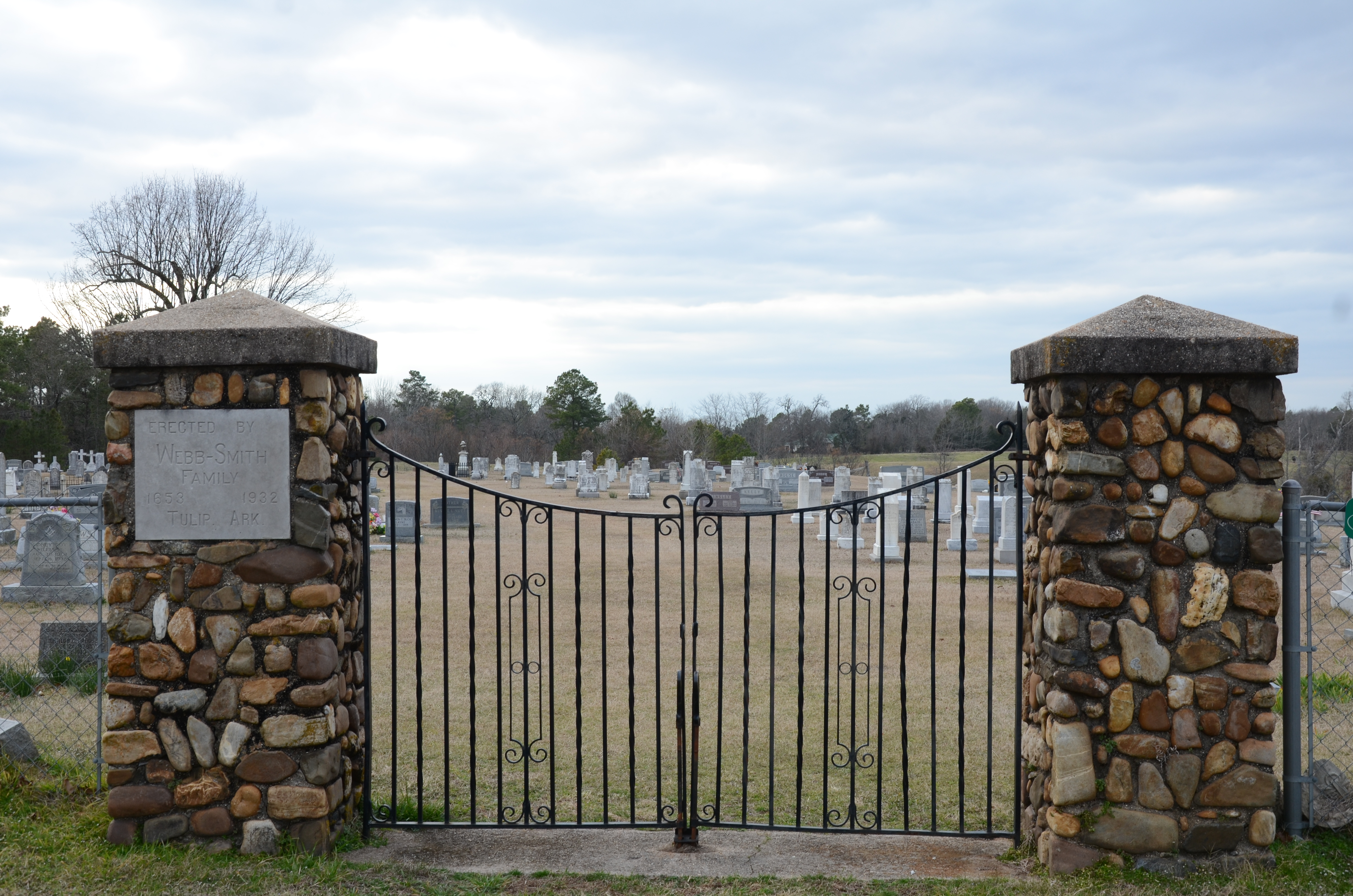
Main gates

== See also ==
- National Register of Historic Places listings in Dallas County, Arkansas
