= List of highways numbered 48A =

The following highways are numbered 48A:

== United States ==
- County Route 48A (Lee County, Alabama)
- Nebraska Spur 48A
- New York State Route 48A (former)
- Oklahoma State Highway 48A

== See also ==
- List of highways numbered 48
