= John Wornall House Museum =

Historic house in Missouri, United States

- Wornall House
- U.S. National Register of Historic Places
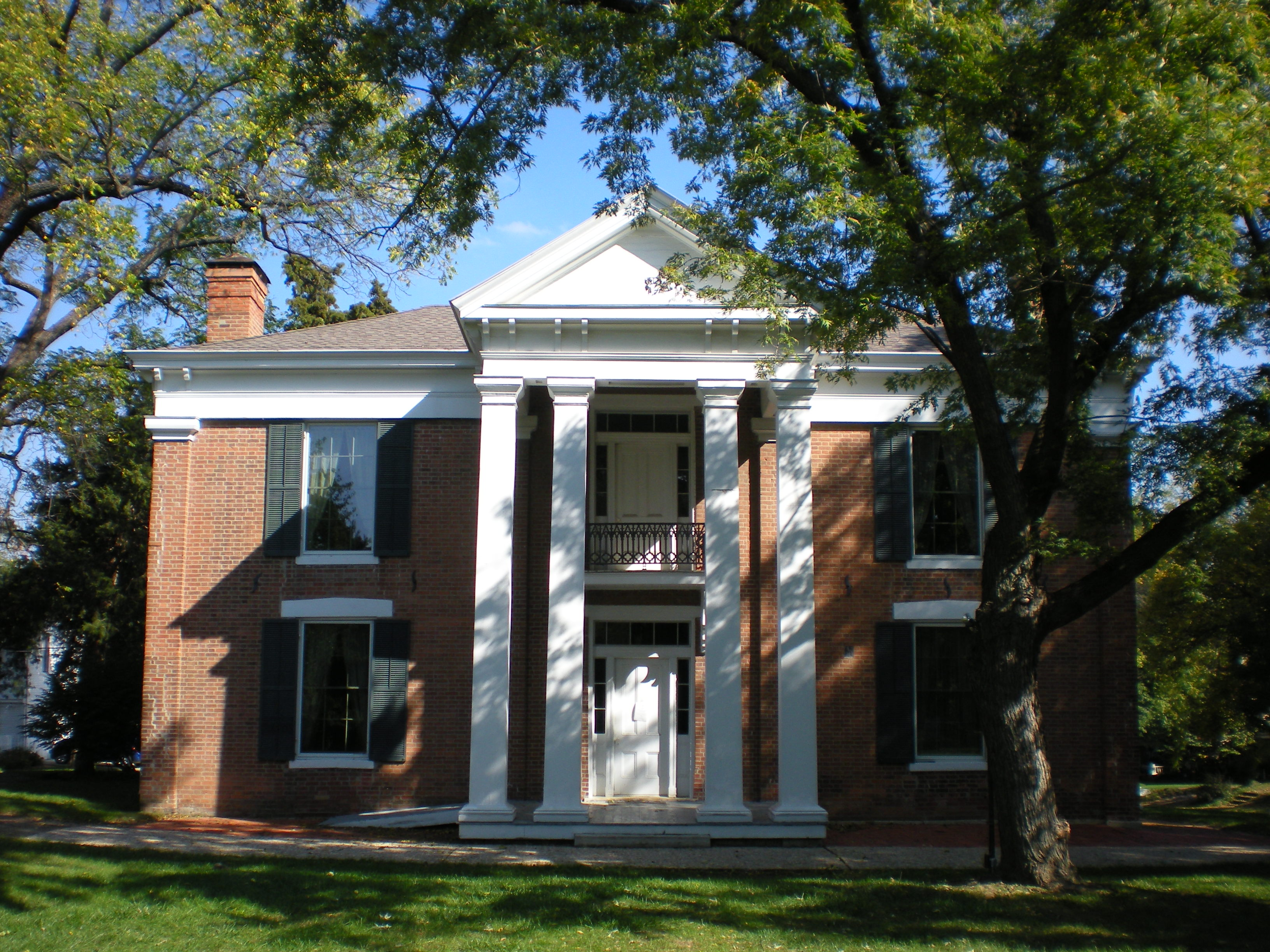

- Location within Missouri Location within the United States
- Interactive map showing the location of John Wornall House
- Location: Kansas City, Missouri
- Coordinates: 39°1′07″N 94°35′32″W
- Built: 1858
- Architect: Asa Beebe Cross
- Architectural style: Greek Revival
- NRHP reference No.: 69000109
- Added to NRHP: May 21, 1969

The John Wornall House Museum is a historic house museum in Kansas City, Missouri. The museum, located at 6115 Wornall Road in the Brookside area of Kansas City, is furnished to represent the daily life of a prosperous, pre-Civil War family.

== History ==
The house was built in 1858 by John B. Wornall in the Greek Revival style of architecture, with bricks hand-fired on the Wornalls' property. It is one of the four remaining Civil War-period homes in the Kansas City area.

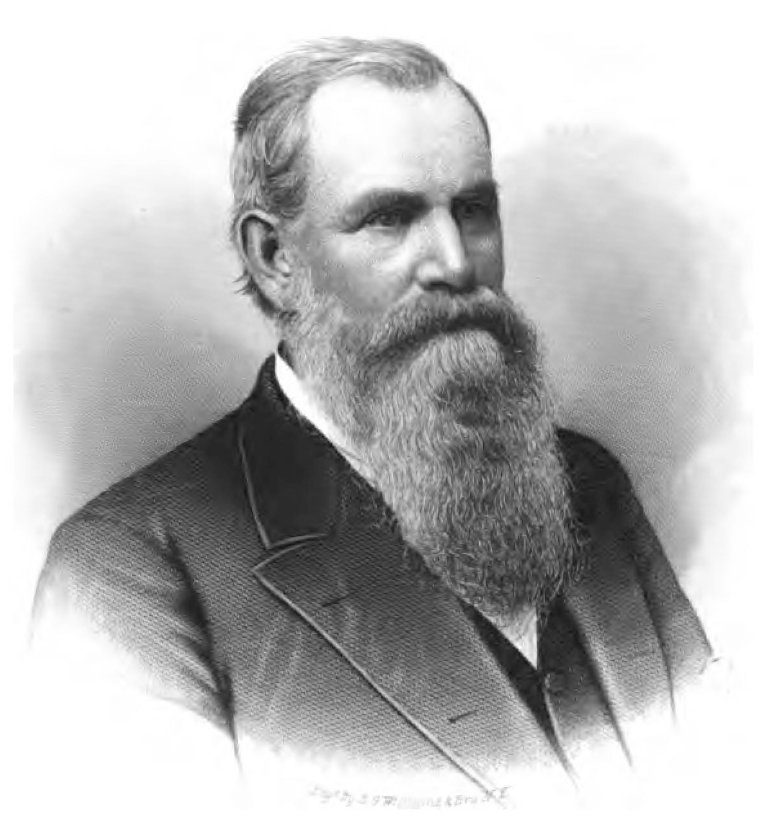
John B. Wornall

John Wornall's father, Richard Wornall, had owned a mule- and horse-trading business in Shelbyville, Kentucky, which ran into financial difficulties. In 1843 Richard Wornall sold 640 acres (2.6 km^{2}) of Shelby County land, thirteen slaves, and most of his livestock and possessions to settle debts totaling almost $25,000. With the rest of his money, Richard Wornall, his wife Judith, and their two sons George Thomas and John Bristow moved to Westport, Missouri. Upon arrival there in October 1843, Richard Wornall purchased five slaves and a 500-acre (2.0 km^{2}) farm from the town's father, John Calvin McCoy. The land, for which Wornall paid $5 per acre, stretched between present-day 59th and 67th streets, State Line, and Main Street in what is now Kansas City.

Richard and Judith's second son, John B. Wornall, eventually inherited the property and built the present house for his second wife, Eliza S. Johnson Wornall.

During the American Civil War, the Wornalls' home was used as a field hospital for both the Union and Confederate forces after the Battle of Westport.
