= Butler-Matthews Homestead =

Historic house in Arkansas, United States

- U.S. National Register of Historic Places
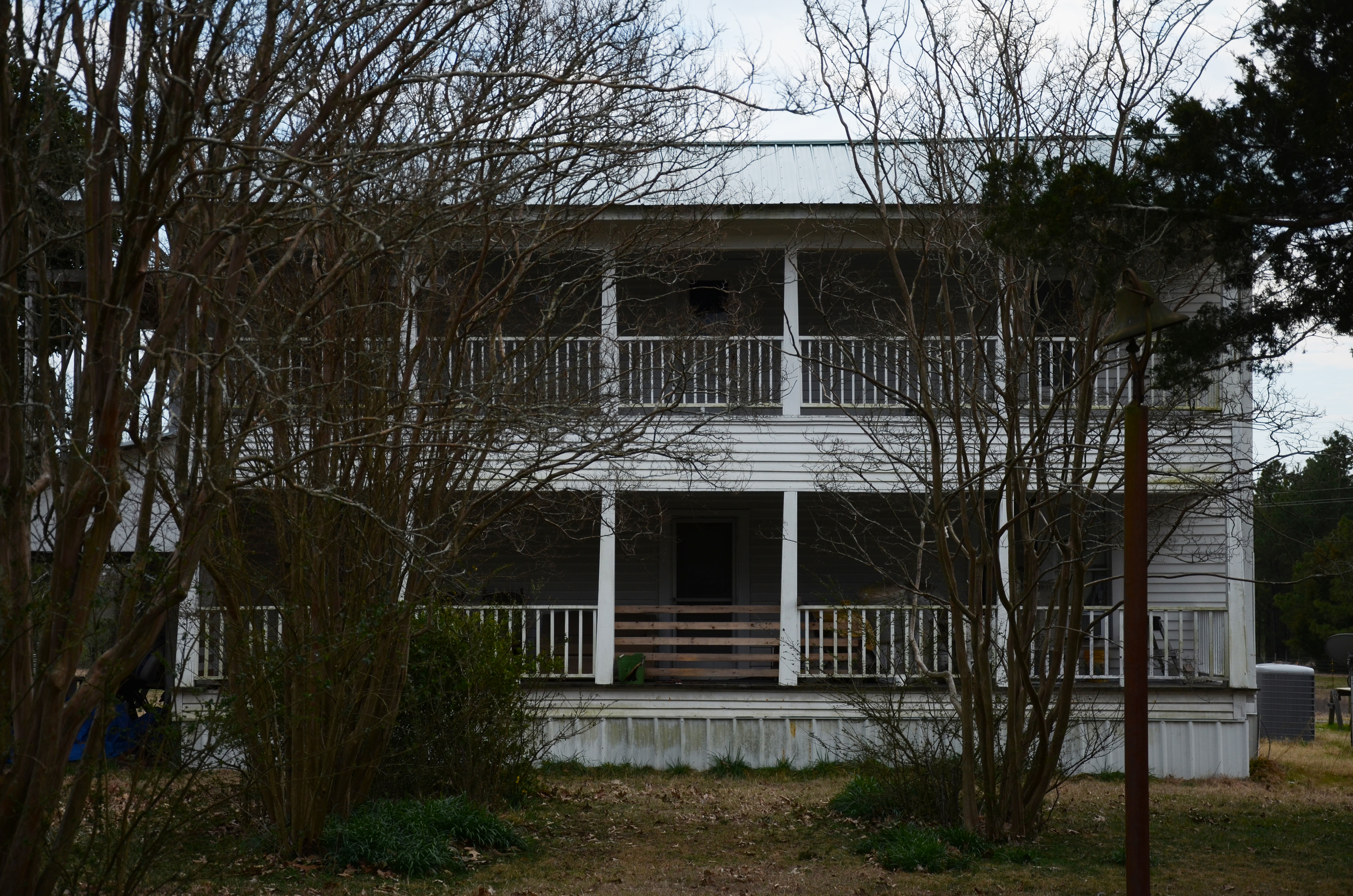
- Nearest city: Tulip, Arkansas
- Area: 9 acres (3.6 ha)
- Built: 1850
- Architectural style: I-House
- MPS: Dallas County MRA
- NRHP reference No.: 83003465
- Added to NRHP: October 28, 1983

The Butler-Matthews Homestead is a historic farm complex near the hamlet of Tulip in rural Dallas County, Arkansas. The property is historically significant for two reasons: the first is that it includes a collection of 15 farm-related buildings built between the 1850s and the 1920s (including two buildings pre-dating the American Civil War), and it is the location of one of Dallas County's two surviving I-houses.

The farm complex was established as early as 1853 by Alexander Butler (1807-1881), and it is a rare fragment of Tulip's economic height between 1840 and 1860. Alex Butler's daughter Mary Jane married into the Matthews family.

The house built by Butler was destroyed by fire in 1921, and it was replaced by the present I-house in 1922 by Ben Matthews. It has a main block two stories high, with a two-story shed-roof porch spanning its front. A single-story gabled ell projects from the rear of the house.

Outbuildings and ancillary structures include a potato house, corn crib, smokehouse, henhouse, cow barn, blacksmith shop, milk house, water well, servant's cottage, overseer's house, and office.

The complex was listed on the National Register of Historic Places in 1983.

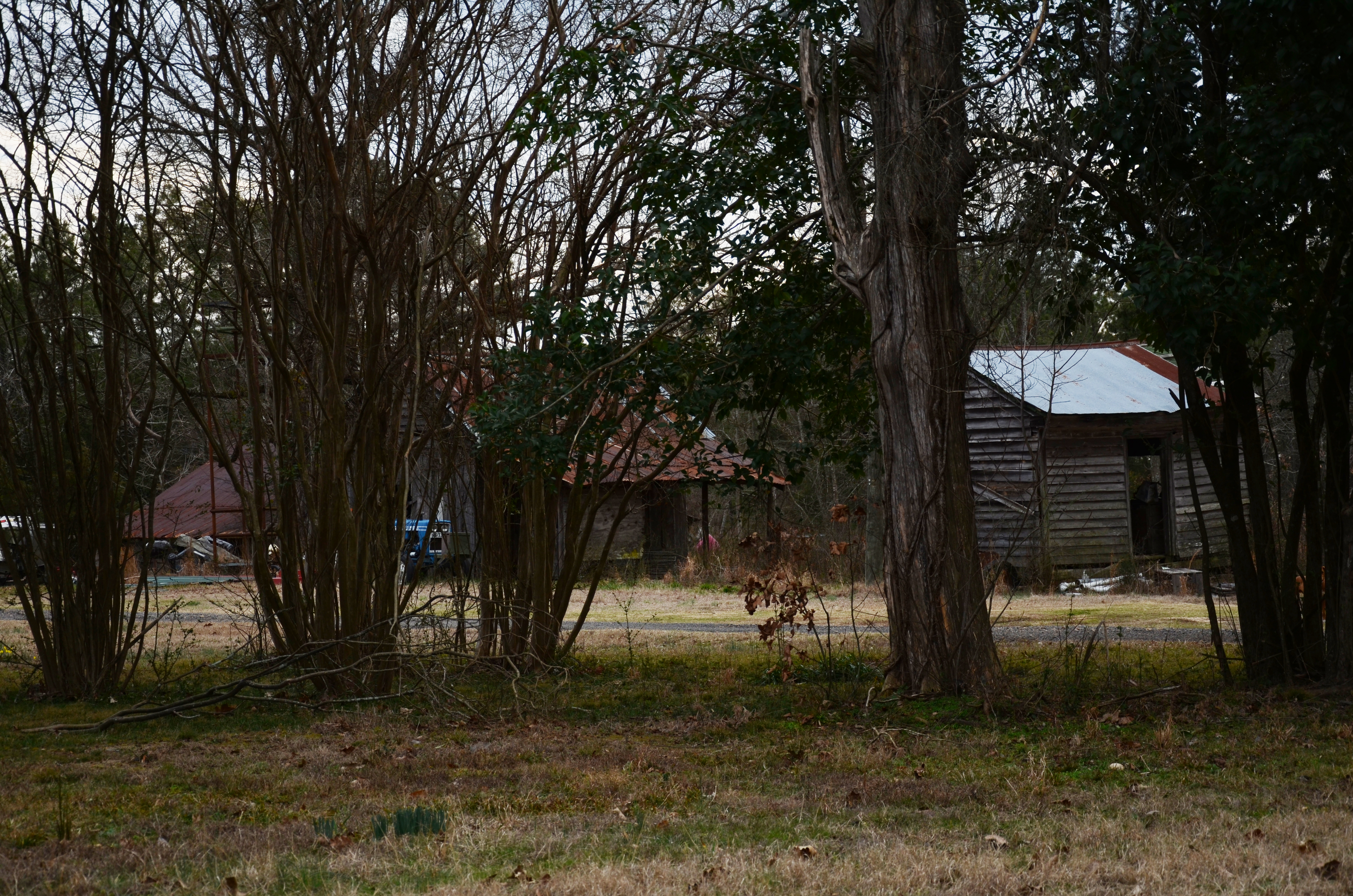
Outbuildings

== See also ==
- National Register of Historic Places listings in Dallas County, Arkansas
