= 48th Arkansas Infantry (Mounted) =

45th Arkansas Infantry (Mounted)
- Active: 1864–1865
- Country: Confederate States
- Allegiance: Arkansas
- Branch: Army
- Type: Infantry
- Size: Regiment
- Facings: Light blue
- Engagements: Price's Missouri Raid, Battle of Fort Davidson Fourth Battle of Boonville Battle of Glasgow, Missouri Battle of Sedalia Second Battle of Lexington Battle of Little Blue River Second Battle of Independence Battle of Byram's Ford Battle of Westport Battle of Marais des Cygnes, Battle of Mine Creek Battle of Marmiton River Second Battle of Newtonia

The 48th Arkansas Infantry (Mounted) (1864–1865) was a Confederate Army Mounted Infantry regiment during the American Civil War. While authorized by the State Military Board as an infantry regiment, the unit was mounted for Price's Missouri Expedition and was officially designated as mounted infantry. Due to its mounted status, the unit is sometimes referred to as the 48th Arkansas Cavalry when a numerical designation is used.

== Organization ==
The 48th Arkansas Mounted Infantry is the least well documented of the Arkansas Confederate regiments raised in 1864. In May 1864, General J. O. Shelby occupied Northeast Arkansas, well behind Union Army lines. In early June 1864, General Shelby commissioned Colonel Thomas Hamilton McCray, among others to begin raising regiments in Northeast Arkansas. By June 13, Shelby reported to General Sterling Price that McCray's efforts were bearing fruit.

The work of recruiting goes bravely on. Colonel McCray will have a brigade and Dobbin, Coffee, Freeman and Coleman will have regiments.

It is unclear who was the commander of the 48th Arkansas or which counties the regiment was recruited from. There are no surviving muster rolls for the regiment; in fact the only documentation that exists for the unit is a list of prisoners captured on October 24, 1864, at Mound City, Kansas, during Price's Raid. Since General Sterling Price generally referred to his units by the name of the unit commander, the reports from Price's raid rarely contain the numerical designation of the unit. Because the names of the other 40 series regimental commanders are known, some historians have speculated that the 48th may have been the numerical designation of Colonel Charles H. Carlton's regiment. Like the other 40 series regiments, Carlton's regiment was raised in the summer of 1864. The only numerical designation known to be associated with the Carlton's regiment is the 28th Arkansas Cavalry. Another 40 series regiment, Colonel James H. McGhee's 44th Arkansas Infantry (Mounted) was also previously known as the 29th Arkansas Cavalry Regiment. Another possibility for the identity of the 48th is a former infantry unit which was mounted for Price's Raid, Colonel James W. Rogan's 30th Arkansas Infantry Regiment.

The decreasing availability of fodder for horses in 1864 led the Confederate Trans-Mississippi Department to issue an order proscribing the raising of additional mounted regiments in Arkansas. However, when General Sterling Price received authorization to conduct a campaign in Missouri that fall, several of the new regiments were mounted in order to accompany him. As a result, the 44th, 45th, 46th, 47th, and 48th were officially mounted infantry regiments instead of cavalry regiments. They were rarely referred to in contemporary reports and orders by numerical designation. Price referred to them as McGehee's Cavalry, Crabtree's Cavalry, etc., which eventually resulted in their later being referred to as 44th Cavalry, 46th Cavalry, etc. The 40-series regiments consisted mostly of conscripts, and absentees from existing units, organized around a small cadre of veterans detailed from infantry regiments, which were expected to be idle during the fall and winter of 1864. Officer Appointments in the 40-series regiments date from the June to August 1864 time frame, so it is assumed that the regiments were mustered into service about the same time at various points in northeast Arkansas.

== Battles ==
With the exception of Colonel William O. Coleman's 46th Arkansas Infantry (Mounted) all other Arkansas units were assigned to James F. Fagan's Division of Arkansas troops in Sterling Price's Army of Missouri for Price's 1864 Missouri Expedition, so it is assumed that the 48th is the designation of one of the Arkansas units assigned to Fagan's Division. Fagan's Division was involved in the following engagements during the raid:

Price's Missouri Raid, Arkansas-Missouri-Kansas, September–October, 1864
Battle of Fort Davidson (September 27, 1864)
Fourth Battle of Boonville (October 11)
Battle of Glasgow, Missouri (October 15)
Battle of Sedalia (October 15)
Second Battle of Lexington (October 19)
Battle of Little Blue River (October 21)
Second Battle of Independence (October 21–22)
Battle of Byram's Ford (October 22–23)
Battle of Westport (October 23)
Battle of Marais des Cygnes, Linn County, Kansas, (October 25)
Battle of Mine Creek (October 25)
Battle of Marmiton River (October 25)
Second Battle of Newtonia (October 28)

After the completion of Price's Raid, much of Fagan's Division was furloughed to return to the area from which it was recruited in order to forage and recover absentees and to return to the army at a prescribed date.

At Boonsborough, on the suggestion of General Fagan, I detached two of his brigades (McCray's and Dobbin's), along with Freeman's brigade, of Marmaduke's division, to take the route to Northeast Arkansas, with instructions to collect all stragglers and deserters, and report south of the Arkansas River, at or near Washington, by the 15th, 20th, and 25th days of December, respectively

A scouting report made by Major Harris S. Greeno, of the 4th Arkansas Cavalry (U. S. Army), dated November 15, 1864, made from Devalls Bluff relayed information on the post raid condition of the Arkansas cavalry regiments. Major Greeno had just learned from deserters and captured Confederate soldiers who had served in Price's Army that survivors were en route by way of White River to northeast Arkansas. His description of the morale of the men in this regiment, as well as the others, was probably very accurate:

“…of these two thirds of the men have deserted and they will never go out again. They have thrown away their arms and are nearly all at their homes. They are all greatly demoralized and discouraged…”

== Surrender ==
It is unclear where the 48th Arkansas Mounted Infantry surrendered at the close of the war. Brigadier General M. Jeff Thompson, Commander of the Military Sub-District of Northeast Arkansas and Southeast Missouri, surrendered his command at Chalk Bluff, Arkansas, on May 11, 1865, and agreed to have his men assemble at Wittsburg and Jacksonport, Arkansas, to lay down their arms and receive their paroles. Thompson's command was widely dispersed throughout northeast Arkansas, more for reasons of available forage than anything else. About a third of his men refused to surrender. Shelby's Missouri Brigade, along with elements of Green's and Jackman's Missouri Brigades, left for Mexico. Some Missouri units disbanded rather than surrender their colors. Many men simply went home. The 44th, 45th, 46th and 47th Arkansas Cavalry regiments surrendered with their command structure intact and were paroled at Jacksonport on June 5, 1865.

== See also ==
- List of Confederate units from Arkansas
- Confederate Units by State

== Bibliography ==
- Allen, Desmond Walls. Forty-fifth Arkansas Confederate Cavalry. Conway, Arkansas: Arkansas Research, 1988. ISBN 0-941765-36-9
- Castel, Albert. General Sterling Price and the Civil War in the West. Baton Rouge, Louisiana: Louisiana State University Press, 1968.
- Donat, P. "Fagan's Attack on Fayetteville." Flashback, 35, No. 4 (November 1985): 8-13.
- Feathers, Tom C. "The History of Military Activities in the Vicinity of Fayetteville Arkansas, Including the Battle of Fayetteville and the Siege of Fayetteville During the War Between the States." Washington County Flashback, 3 (April 1953): 2-33.
- Kerby, Robert L. Kirby Smith's Confederacy: The Trans-Mississippi South, 1863-1865. Tuscaloosa, Alabama: The University of Alabama Press, 1972.
- Morgan, James Logan. "A Brief History of the 45th Arkansas Cavalry Regiment, C.S.A." in The Stream of History, Volumen 16, Number 4 (Oct. 1978). Page 3.
- Mobley, Freeman. Making Sense of the Civil War in Batesville-Jacksonport and Northeast Arkansas, 1861-1874. Batesville, Arkansas: P.D. Printing, 2005.
- Monaghan, Jay. Swamp Fox of the Confederacy: The Life and Military Services of M. Jeff Thompson. Tuscaloosa, Alabama: Confederate Publishing Co., 1956.
- Monnett, Howard N. and Monnett, John H. Action before Westport, 1864. University Press of Colorado, 1964. ISBN 0-87081-413-3.
