= Forty-eighters (disambiguation) =

Forty-eighters may refer to:

- Forty-eighters, European supporters of the Revolutions of 1848
- Forty-eighters, participants in the American liberal political organization, the Committee of 48 (1919–24)
- Forty-eighters, members of the People's Party of Korea, that joined the Workers' Party of South Korea in 1948
- Forty-eighters, the earliest arrivals to California in the 1848–1855 California Gold Rush
- Arab citizens of Israel tracing their presence to before the 1949 Armistice Agreements
- Supporters of the 1848 Hungarian Revolution, the resulting Ideology of '48, or its main political proponent, the Party of Independence and '48

== See also ==
- Forty and Eight, a veterans organization in the United States
