= A49 =

A49 may refer to:

- A49 road (England), a road connecting Ross-on-Wye and Bamber Bridge
- A49 autoroute, a road connecting Grenoble and Valence, France
- Central Coast Highway (A49), a road in New South Wales, Australia
- King's Indian Defence, Encyclopaedia of Chess Openings code
- Route A49 (WMATA), a bus route operated by the Washington Metropolitan Area Transit Authority

A-49 may refer to:

- Autovía A-49, a major highway in Andalucia, Spain

A 49 may refer to:

- Bundesautobahn 49, Germany
