= Tulip, Arkansas =

Tulip
- Unincorporated community
- Location within Arkansas Location within the United States
- Coordinates: 34°04′56″N 92°39′14″W
- Country: United States
- State: Arkansas
- County: Dallas
- Elevation: 472 ft (144 m)
- Time zone: UTC-6 (Central (CST))
  - Summer (DST): UTC-5 (CDT)
- Area code: 870
- GNIS feature ID: 78593

Tulip is an unincorporated community in Dallas County, Arkansas, United States. The community is on Arkansas Highway 9 5.7 miles (9.2 km) west of Carthage.

Tulip was settled shortly after Arkansas became a state in 1836. It was originally known as both Brownsville and Smithville after local settlers before adopting its current name, which came from either the area's large tulip tree population or the mnemonic for the five points of Calvinism. The community prospered in its early years; a local pottery industry developed, and the Arkansas Military Institute and Tulip Female Collegiate Seminary opened there in 1850. In the same year, the state's first monthly magazine, appropriately named the Tulip, began publication in Tulip. The community declined after the Civil War began, as most of its male population left to fight in the war and never returned. Tulip presently comprises a small collection of houses, churches, and abandoned buildings.

There are three sites on the National Register of Historic Places which are in or near Tulip: the Butler-Matthews Homestead, Tulip Cemetery, and the Welch Pottery Works.
