= 48th Battalion =

48th Battalion or 48th Infantry Battalion may refer to:

- 48th Battalion (Australia), a unit of the Australian Army
- 2/48th Battalion (Australia), a unit of the Australian Army that served during World War II
- 48th Battalion (British Columbia), CEF, a unit of the Canadian Expeditionary Force during World War I
- 48th Battalion Iowa Volunteer Infantry

== See also ==
- 48th Division (disambiguation)
- 48th Brigade (disambiguation)
