= Archibald S. Dobbins =

Confederate cavalry officer

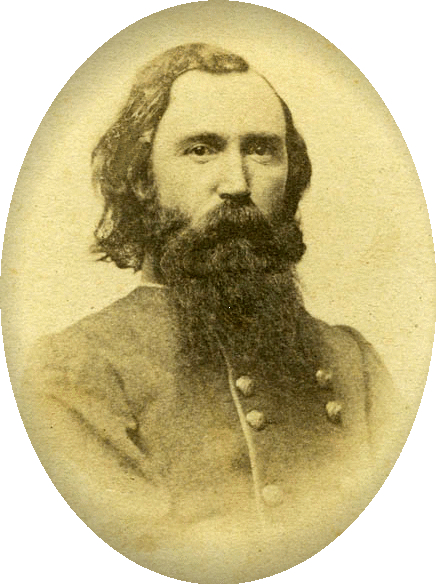
- Dobbins in uniform, c. 1862
- Born: Archibald Stephenson Dobbins c. 1827; Maury County, Tennessee
- Disappeared: c. 1878 (aged 51); Patagonia (present-day Santa Cruz Province), Argentina
- Status: Missing for 148 years, 10 months and 5 days
- Monuments: Dobbins Memorial Marker, Confederate Cemetery, Helena, Arkansas
- Occupations: Merchant; officer; farmer
- Spouse: Mary P. Dawson (m. 1849)
- Children: 3
- Military service
- Allegiance: Confederate States
- Branch: Army
- Service years: 1862–1865
- Rank: Colonel
- Commands: 1st Arkansas Cavalry Regiment; 1st Arkansas Cavalry Brigade
- Battles: American Civil War; Battle of Prairie Grove; Battle of Helena; Battle of Big Creek; Battle of Bayou Fourche; Battle of Pine Bluff; Price's Missouri Expedition
- Criminal information
- Status: Remitted, restored to duty
- Criminal charge: Disobedience of Orders in the face of the enemy
- Penalty: Dismissed from Service

Archibald Stephenson Dobbins (c. 1827 – presumably on or after 1878) was an officer of the Confederate States Army who commanded cavalry in the Trans-Mississippi Theater of the American Civil War. Initially refusing to serve under Brigadier-general John S. Marmaduke after the Marmaduke-Walker Duel, Dobbins was court-martialed for insubordination.

Born in Maury County, Tennessee, Dobbins entered Confederate service in 1862 as a volunteer aide-de-camp to Major-general Thomas C. Hindman. That same year, Dobbins was commissioned a colonel of cavalry. Paroled as a prisoner of war at Galveston, Texas, on July 13, 1865, he went into the mercantile business in New Orleans. Moving without his family to Santarem, Brazil, in 1867, he settled two years later near Itaituba, where he opened a sawmill and gristmill. In 1878, he immigrated to the Patagonia region of Argentina, where he was engaged in business. The circumstances surrounding Dobbins' death remain a mystery to this day.

== Early life ==
Dobbins was born c. 1827 in Maury County, Tennessee, to David and Catherine (née Gilchrist) Dobbins. Shortly after his marriage to Mary Patience Dawson, he moved to Coahoma County, Mississippi, then relocated to Phillips County, Arkansas, acquiring Horse Shoe Island Plantation, near Helena.

== American Civil War ==
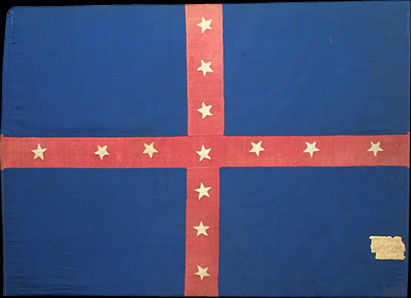
Regimental color of Dobbins' regiment

When Confederate Major-general Thomas C. Hindman was appointed commanding officer of the District of Arkansas in the summer of 1862, he brought Dobbins with him from Mississippi to Little Rock as a volunteer aide-de-camp on his personal staff. Following the Battle of Prairie Grove, he was appointed colonel of a new unit colloquially known as "Dobbins' regiment".

Dobbins' regiment was assigned to a division commanded by Brigadier-general Lucius M. Walker and fought in several battles, skirmishes, and raids throughout the Trans-Mississippi Department. After Walker was killed in a duel with Brigadier-general John S. Marmaduke, Dobbins assumed command of Walker's cavalry division. When Marmaduke took command at the Battle of Bayou Fourche, Dobbins refused to serve under him. Marmaduke ordered his arrest. Court-martialed at Camp Bragg, Arkansas, on November 23, 1863, Dobbins was found guilty of "disobedience of orders in the face of the enemy." President Jefferson Davis remitted the sentence of the court-martial and Dobbins returned to the Trans-Mississippi Department for the duration of the war. Dobbins received a field promotion to brigadier-general, but was never nominated by President Davis nor confirmed by the Confederate Senate in part due to the isolated condition of the Trans-Mississippi Theater toward the end of the Civil War. He was paroled as a prisoner of war at Galveston, Texas, on July 13, 1865.

== Later life ==
After the Civil War, Dobbins went into the mercantile business in New Orleans. In 1867, he and a brother relocated to the Para region of Brazil. Two years later, he wrote for his wife and children to join him there. But as Mary made travel plans, the letters stopped coming. In June 1878, records indicate he immigrated to the Patagonia region of Argentina, where he was engaged in business. An article in the August 7, 1881, edition of The Standard, an English-language newspaper out of Buenos Aires, states that eight Scottish colonists from Greenock had contracted with Dobbins five years earlier for their passage to Port Desire, Argentina.

== Speculation on disappearance ==
Theories about Dobbins' fate range from murder at the hands of Indians, a natural death in the Patagonia region of Argentina, to a desire to abandon his family.

== Monuments and memorials ==
Dobbins' cenotaph is in a cemetery in Helena, Arkansas. It notes that his body was never recovered.

== See also ==
- List of people who disappeared mysteriously (pre-1910)

== Notes ==
Military offices
| New regiment | Commanding officer of the 1st Arkansas Cavalry Regiment; 1863–1865 | Regiment disbanded |
