= 48th Street =

48th Street may refer to:

- 48th Street (Sacramento RT), Sacramento, California
- 48th Street (Manhattan), New York City

== See also ==
- 48th Street Theatre
