= 48th Division =

48th Division or 48th Infantry Division may refer to:

== Infantry divisions ==
- 48th Infantry Division (1st Formation) (People's Republic of China)
- 48th Reserve Division, German Empire
- 48th Infantry Division (Wehrmacht), Germany
- 48th Infantry Division "Taro", Kingdom of Italy
- 48th Division (Imperial Japanese Army)
- 48th Infantry Division (Russian Empire)
- 48th Guards Rifle Division, Soviet Union
- 48th Motor Rifle Division, Soviet Union
- 48th Rifle Division, Soviet Union
- 48th (South Midland) Division, United Kingdom
- 48th Infantry Division (United States), a phantom unit

== Armoured divisions ==
- 48th Guards Tank Training Division, Soviet Union
- 48th Armored Division (United States)

== Aviation divisions ==
- 48th Air Division, People's Republic of China

== See also ==
- List of military divisions by number
- 48th Brigade (disambiguation)
- 48th Regiment (disambiguation)
- 48th Battalion (disambiguation)
- 48th Squadron (disambiguation)
