= 48th Infantry Division (1st Formation) (People's Republic of China) =

48th Division (1949–1952)
- Founded: February 1949
- Disbanded: March 1952
- Country: People's Republic of China
- Allegiance: Chinese Communist Party
- Branch: People's Liberation Army
- Type: Division
- Role: Infantry
- Part of: 16th Corps
- Engagements: Chinese Civil War

The 48th Division (Chinese: 第48师) was created in February 1949 under the Regulation of the Redesignations of All Organizations and Units of the Army, issued by Central Military Commission on November 1, 1948, basing on the 3rd Independent Brigade of Yuwansu Military District.

The division is part of 16th Corps. Under the flag of 48th division it took part in the Chinese Civil War. On March 13, 1952, the division was disbanded.

As of its disbandment the division was composed of:

- 142nd Regiment;
- 143rd Regiment;
- 144th Regiment.
