= Battle of Westport =

Battle of the American Civil War

- Part of the American Civil War
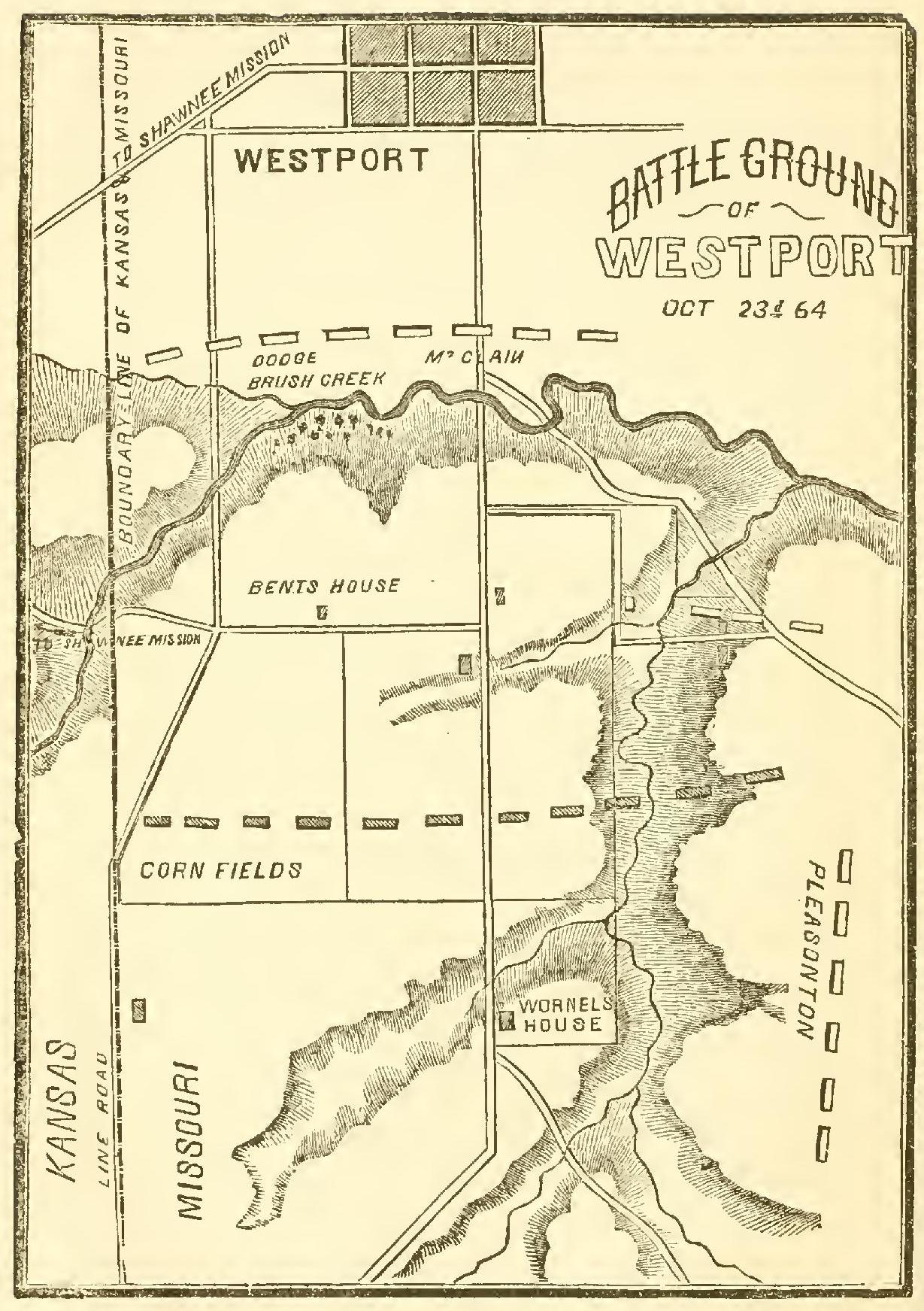
- Battleground of Westport
Date	October 23, 1864 (161 years ago)
Location	Westport (present-day Kansas City), Missouri 39°01′48″N 94°35′40″W
Result	Union victory

Belligerents
United States (Union)	Confederate States

Commanders and leaders
(United States) Samuel R. Curtis	(Confederate States of America) Sterling Price

Units involved
Army of the Border	Army of Missouri

Strength
22,000	8,500

Casualties and losses
~1,500	~1,500
- Location within Missouri

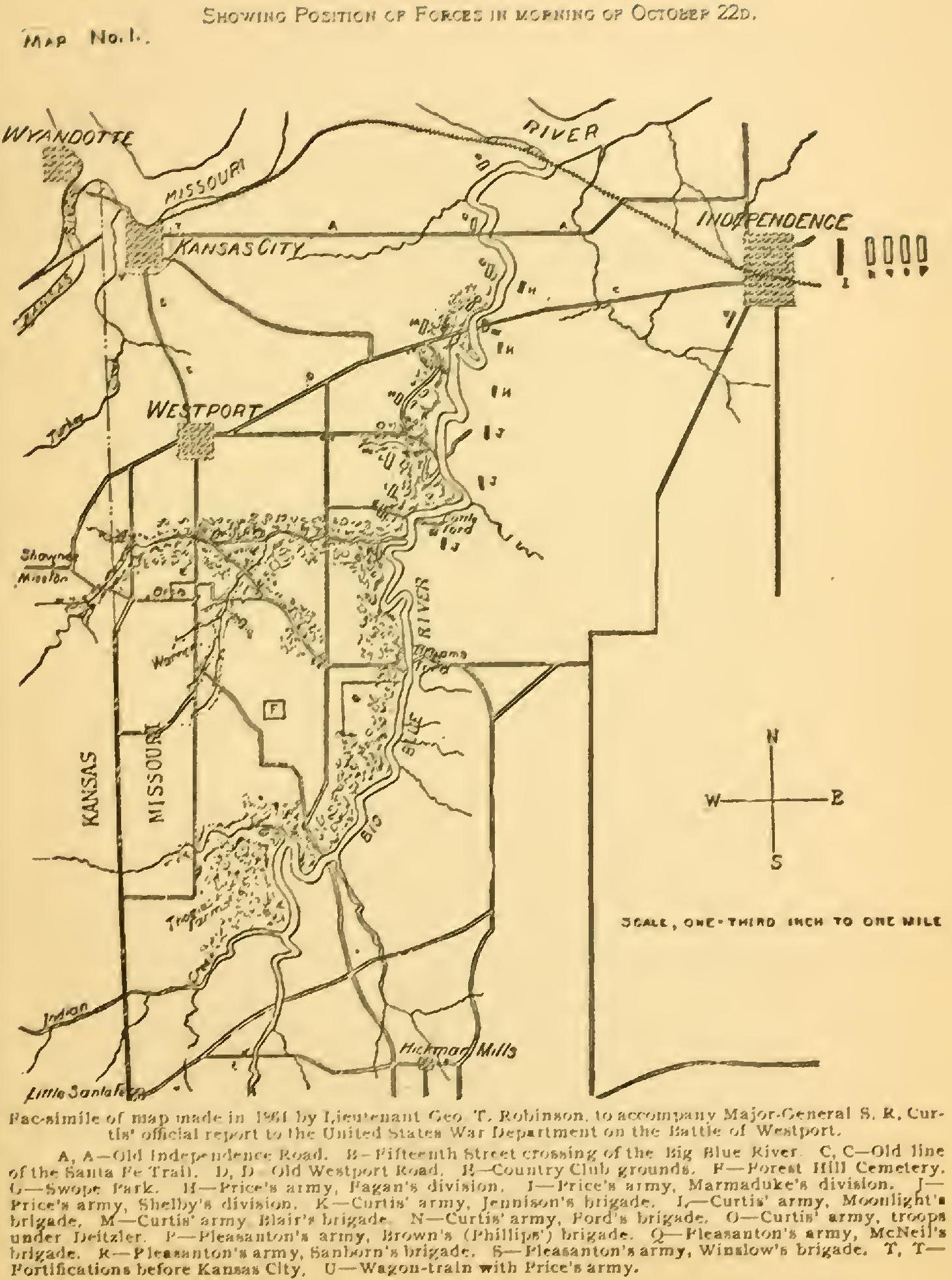
Showing Position of Forces in morning of October 22nd

The Battle of Westport, sometimes referred to as the "Gettysburg of the West", was a battle of the American Civil War fought on October 23, 1864, in modern Kansas City, Missouri. Union forces under Major General Samuel R. Curtis decisively defeated an outnumbered Confederate force under Major General Sterling Price, forcing his army to retreat and marking the turning point of his Missouri Expedition. The battle ended the last major Confederate offensive west of the Mississippi River, and for the remainder of the war the United States Army maintained solid control over most of Missouri. More than 30,000 troops fought in the clash, one of the largest west of the Mississippi River.

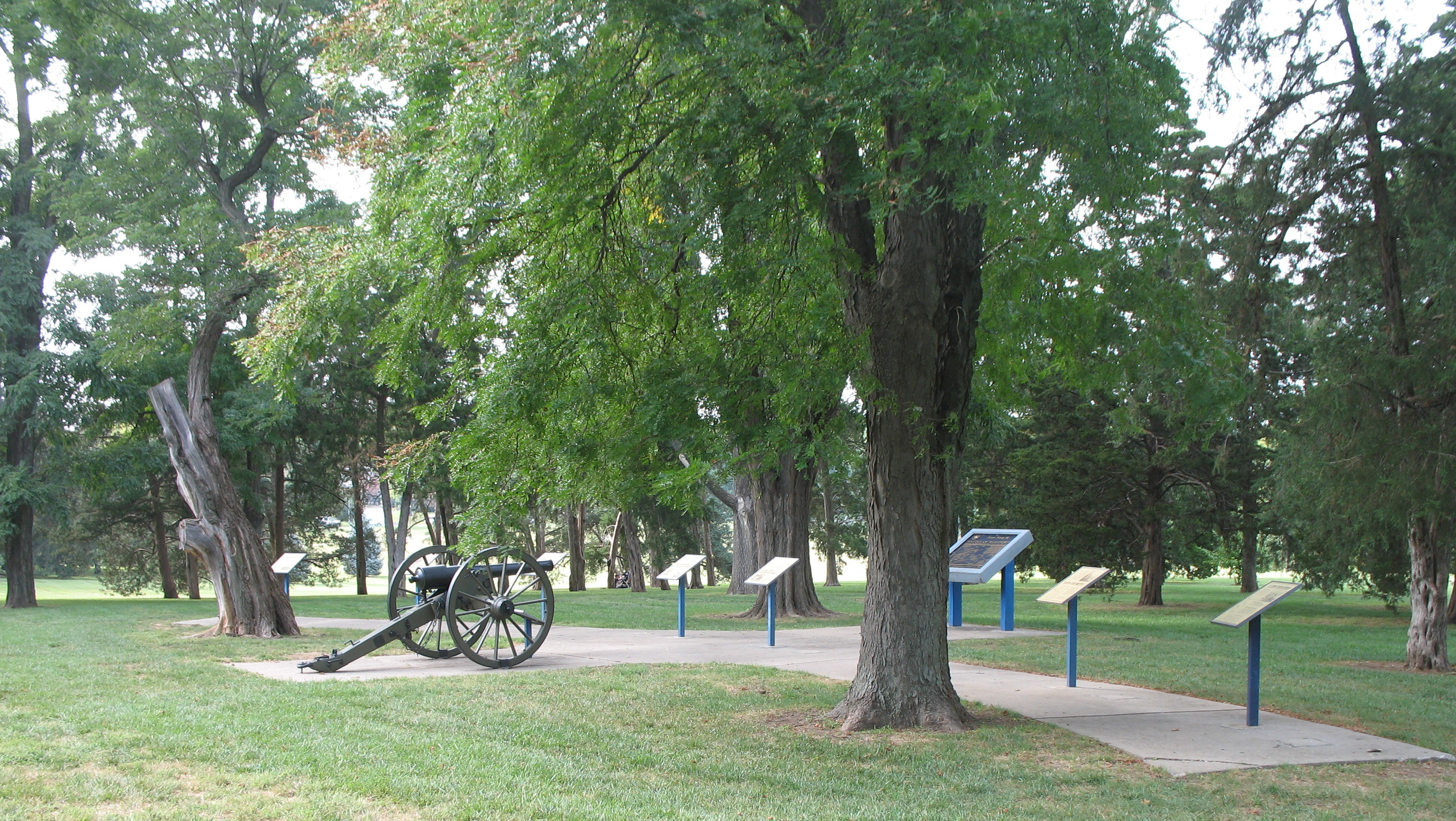
Cannon at Loose Park. Price was said to have watched the battle from a grove of trees here. The "General Tree", long since gone, was a landmark for many years

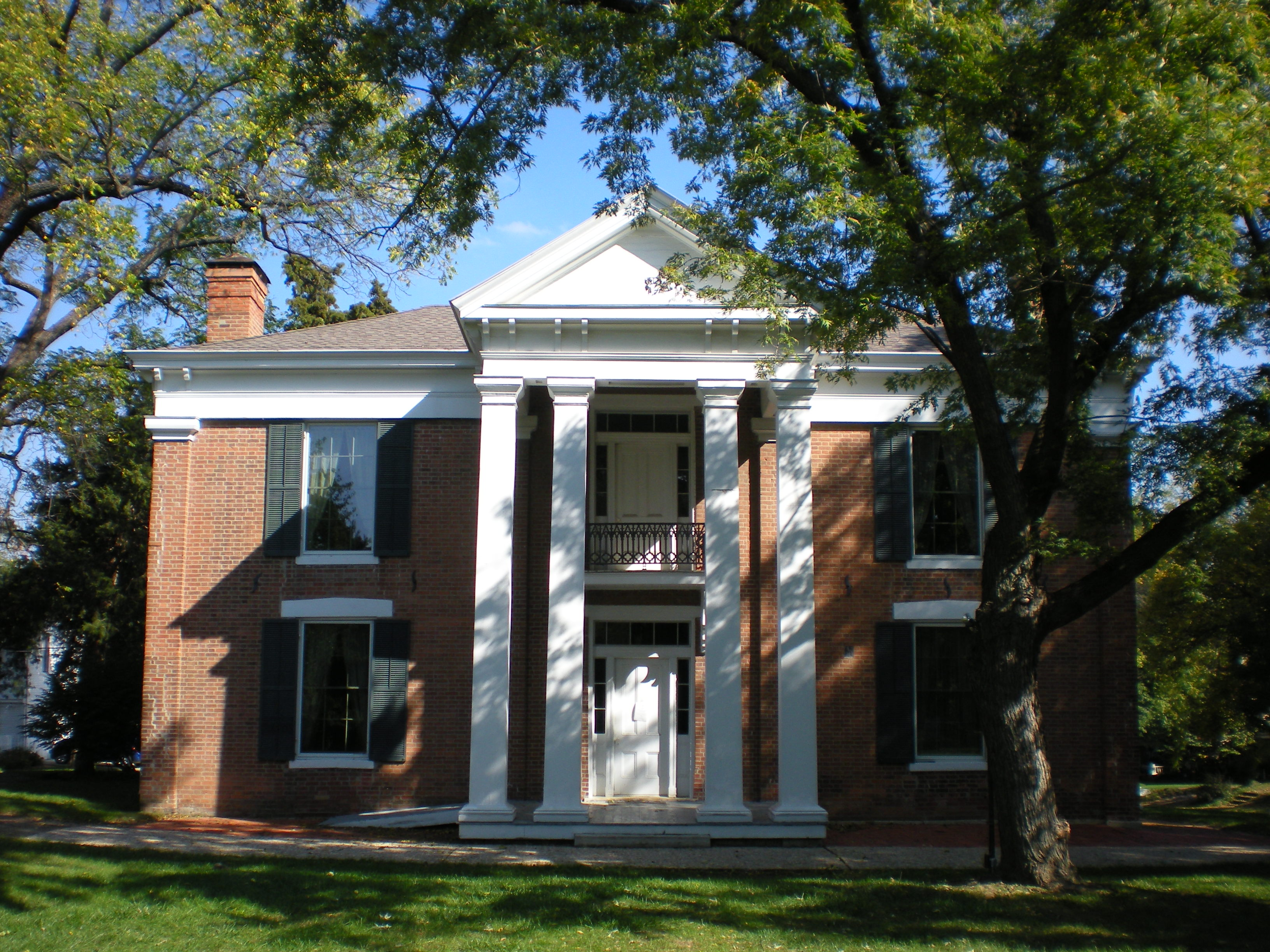
John Wornall House, which was used by both sides as a hospital

== Location ==
Westport, Kansas City, today a part of Kansas City, Missouri, had already established its place in history by the time Union and Confederate forces clashed there in 1864. John Calvin McCoy, known as the "Father of Kansas City", had laid out the town, and pioneers traveling along the Oregon, California and Santa Fe Trails passed through it on their way West. Westport gradually replaced nearby Independence as the "jumping-off point" for the westward trails, contributing to the growth of the town.

During the Civil War, nearby Kansas City (known then as the Town of Kansas) served as headquarters for the Federal "District of the Border" and was garrisoned by a sizable contingent of Union troops. While its own municipal star was beginning to fade in favor of its northern neighbor, Westport was still of some importance in the region. The decision to fight there, however, would be the result of a chain of events that had little to do with any strategic importance of the town itself.

== Price's Raid begins ==
In September 1864, Major General Sterling Price led his Army of Missouri into Missouri, with the hope of capturing the state for the South and turning the Northerners against Abraham Lincoln in the presidential election of 1864. Major General William S. Rosecrans, commanding the Federal Department of the Missouri, began assembling troops to repel the invasion. Rosecrans's cavalry under Major General Alfred Pleasonton set out in pursuit of Price's force, accompanied by a large detachment of infantry from the Army of the Tennessee under General Andrew J. Smith. After his defeat at the Battle of Ft. Davidson, Price realized that St. Louis was far too heavily fortified for his rather small force (12,000 men), so he turned west to threaten Jefferson City. After light skirmishing there, Price again decided that this target was also too heavily fortified and moved further west toward Fort Leavenworth. As he marched on, disease and desertion coupled with battlefield losses whittled his force down to 8,500 men.

== The Union responds ==
After learning of Confederate movements from spies, including Wild Bill Hickok, commander of the Federal Department of Kansas Major General Samuel R. Curtis faced the threat of Price's army moving into his Department. Curtis assembled his troops into a force that he named the Army of the Border. James G. Blunt was recalled from Indian campaigns to lead its 1st Division, composed mostly of volunteer regiments and some Kansas militia. Curtis was only initially able to muster about 4,000 volunteers; he asked Kansas governor Thomas Carney to call out the state militia to bolster his forces. Governor Carney immediately suspected Curtis of attempting to draw the militia away from their voting districts, as election time was nearing. Carney was unconcerned with Price's force far away in Missouri, and felt it posed no threat to Kansas. However, once Price had turned west toward Jefferson City, Carney relented and Major General George Dietzler took command of a division of Kansas Militia that joined Curtis's Army of the Border.

== Command disputes ==
By order of Maj. Gen. Blunt (General Field Orders No. 2) the militia regiments of William H.M. Fishbeck, Brigadier General of Militia, were placed under the command of Charles W. Blair, Colonel of Volunteers; Fishbeck was infuriated that his command had been subordinated to a volunteer officer. Since Kansas law stated that militia should be kept under the command of militia officers, Fishbeck disregarded Blunt's order. Blunt had Fishbeck arrested and held until he was released by order of Maj. Gen. Curtis. Upon release, Fishbeck resumed command of the Kansas Militia regiments, with orders to obey directives that came from Maj. Gen. Blunt. This rather cumbersome arrangement had Brig. Gen. Fishbeck in direct command of the militia units attached to the 3rd Brigade, 1st Division, and Col. Charles Blair in overall command of the brigade. Howard N. Monnett describes the arrangement as a "brigade within a brigade". Blair and Fishbeck led the militia into action at Westport (accompanied onto the field by Maj. Gen. George W. Dietzler), and then in the subsequent pursuit of Price until Maj. Gen. Curtis ordered the militia to return home.

== Battle ==
=== Prelude ===
General Curtis sent the bulk of his 1st Division under Gen. James Blunt to confront the Confederates at Lexington, about forty miles east of Kansas City, on October 19. Blunt was unable to stop Price, but did slow his progress and gathered information on the Confederate forces. Again, at the Little Blue River on October 21, Blunt was forced to retire — but not without slowing Price enough for a pursuing Federal cavalry division under Alfred Pleasonton to close the gap between himself and the Rebels. Additional fighting occurred the next day at Independence, with Price emerging victorious yet again. Curtis was nearly sixty years old, and age had taken a toll on his desire for combat; however, thanks to his aggressive subordinate Gen. Blunt, Curtis decided to make another stand south of Westport. Blunt personally oversaw the construction of a defensive line south of the town along Brush Creek, perpendicular to the Kansas state line.

Price was aware of the forces to his front and rear, which together outnumbered him nearly three-to-one, so he determined to deal with them one at a time. He decided to attack Curtis's army first, at Westport. Almost as old as his adversary, Price left direction of the engagement to his subordinate, General Jo Shelby. With about 500 wagons and 5,000 head of cattle, Price first needed a ford for his supply trains to cross the Blue River near Westport. One of Price's divisions under John S. Marmaduke accordingly forced a crossing at Byram's Ford on the 22nd, then took up positions on the west bank to hold off Pleasonton's Federal Cavalry, which now threatened Price's rear. Two other Confederate divisions, under Shelby and James Fagan, were poised to assault Blunt along Brush Creek the next day, hoping to defeat him before Pleasonton could arrive on the field in force.

=== Action at Brush Creek ===
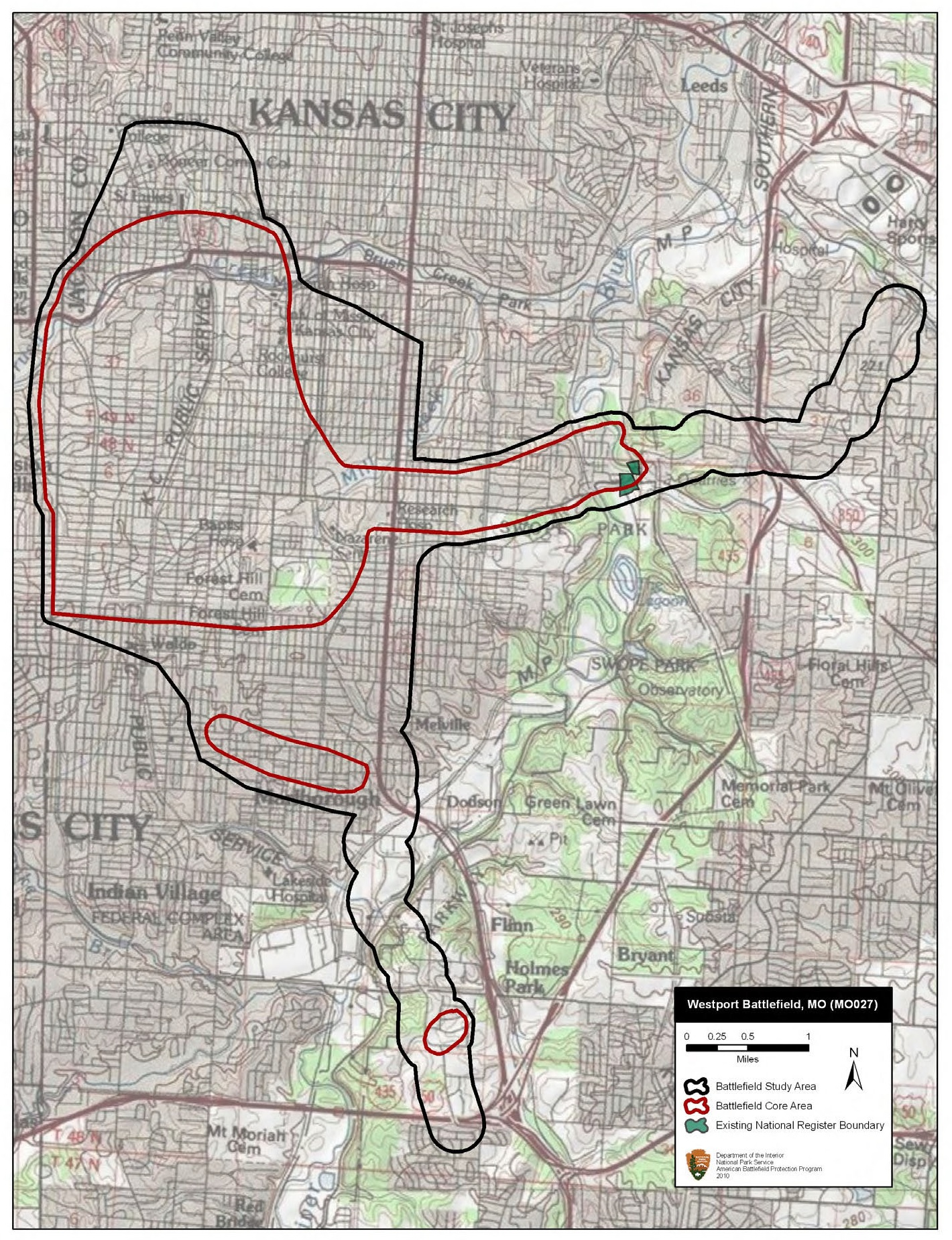
Map of Westport Battlefield core and study areas by the American Battlefield Protection Program

Anticipating Price's impending attack, Blunt had positioned his three available brigades along Brush Creek, while a fourth under Col. Charles Blair was en route from Kansas City. East of Wornall Lane (present-day Wornall Road) was the brigade of J. Hobart Ford. West of Wornall was the brigade of Charles "Doc" Jennison, with an artillery battery in support. Two regiments of cavalry filled the gap to the west between Jennison and the Kansas/Missouri state line. At a right angle to Jennison was the brigade of Thomas Moonlight, running parallel to the state line. Moonlight was positioned to either support Jennison or move against the Confederate flank.

At daybreak on the 23rd, Blunt opened the battle by sending Jennison and Ford over an icy Brush Creek with their skirmishers. Advancing up a ridge, the Union forces engaged the Confederates in an open field to the south. The rebel divisions of Joseph O. Shelby and James Fagan had meanwhile received orders from Price to hold Curtis in front of Westport. Shelby counterattacked with his Iron Brigade under M. Jeff Thompson in the lead. This attack drove the outflanked Federals back across the creek. Moonlight's brigade was hit so hard that it was forced to fall back to the high ground on Brush Creek's west bluff, into what is now Westwood, Kansas, while Jennison's brigade retreated almost to the streets of Westport. It appeared at this point that the Confederates might carry the day.

But this was not to be. Shelby's force was out of ammunition, and remained on the heights south of Brush Creek. Also at this crucial hour, Col. Blair's brigade arrived and Curtis heard Pleasonton's guns engaging the Confederates at nearby Byram's Ford. His spirits lifted, the Union commander rode to the front lines and personally directed Blair's troops into battle west of Jennison. The reinforced Federals charged across the creek once more, with Blair in the lead, but were again repulsed and retreated to the north bank.

Needing another option besides frontal assaults, Curtis decided to search for a weak point elsewhere in the Rebel lines. His scouts found a farmer named George Thoman, who was eager to help the Federals as the Confederates had absconded with his horse the previous night. Thoman showed Curtis a gulch, cut by Swan Creek, running up to a rise along Shelby's left flank. Curtis personally directed his headquarters escort and the 9th Wisconsin Battery through this gully. Meanwhile, Blunt continued to push Jennison and Ford up the rise across Brush Creek, making slow progress until the 9th Wisconsin opened fire upon the Confederate flank and rear. Encouraged, Blunt's men now poured over the ridge, but Shelby's men fought back stubbornly and a see-saw battle ensued in the open prairie. The Union army gradually gained the upper hand, slowly pushing Shelby's brigades back to the Wornall House.

=== Fight for the fords ===
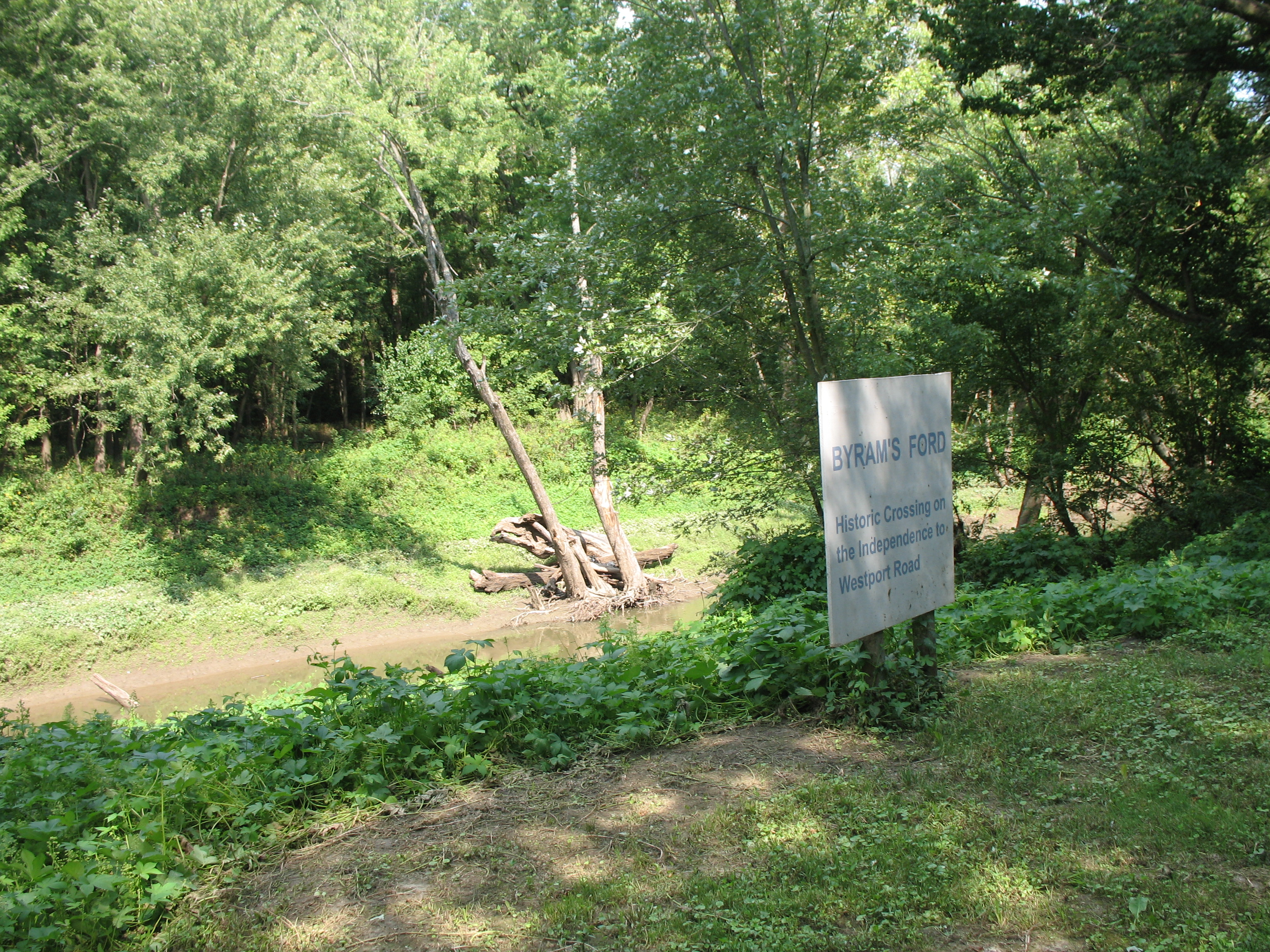
Byram's Ford, site of the 1864 battle

As disaster was befalling Shelby and Fagan, a similar fate was happening to Price's rearguard, under Marmaduke, at Byram's Ford. A division of Price's army under General Shelby had forced a crossing at the ford on the 22nd (the day prior to the battle), forcing Federal defenders there to retire to Westport. Shelby's colleague General Marmaduke had subsequently established his own defensive line on the west bank of the river to hold off Pleasanton's cavalry, which was pressing them hard from the east. If Pleasanton could now force his way across the Blue River, he would be in position to threaten Price's army as well as his supplies.

Marmaduke's division was attacked by three of Pleasonton's brigades starting at 8:00 on the morning of the 23rd; the Confederates initially managed to hold their own. One of the Union brigade commanders, Brig. Gen. Egbert B. Brown, stalled his attack and was placed under arrest by Pleasonton for disobeying orders. Another of Pleasonton's brigade commanders, Col. Edward F. Winslow, was wounded and succeeded by Lt. Col. Frederick Benteen, who would later ride to fame at Little Bighorn. Despite these setbacks, Federal troopers gained the west bank by 11:00 and Marmaduke retired. As Brown's brigade (now led by Col. John F. Philips) forded the river, they came under heavy fire from Marmaduke's artillery. Once they had crossed, they charged Marmaduke across an open field; during this charge, Union troops from Missouri and Arkansas battled Confederates from these same two states. Marmaduke was forced back, rejoining Shelby and Fagan, and Blunt pounded the now-consolidated Confederate remnants with his own cannon.

While the main Confederate army was now being hit hard on two sides, Pleasonton's fourth brigade under Brig. Gen. John McNeil moved against a Rebel brigade under William Lewis Cabell guarding a second ford near Hickman Mills. McNeil's brigade was able to drive the Confederates from the ford and cross the river. Federal columns were now converging on Price from three different directions.

=== Confederate retreat ===
The Confederates pulled back to their last line of defense, along the road south of Forest Hill (present day Gregory Blvd), with Colonel Jennison leading the pursuit. By now thirty Union guns had been brought to bear against the lone remaining Confederate cannon. One Federal battery had just unlimbered when Colonel James H. McGhee's Arkansas Cavalry charged down Wornall's Lane in an attempt to capture it. Captain Curtis Johnson of the 15th Kansas Cavalry saw the Confederate attack forming and immediately moved to intercept. Johnson and McGhee personally engaged each other with their revolvers; both commanders were badly wounded, but survived. The fight continued to rage until Union reinforcements secured the battery.

Shelby sent a brigade under Colonel Sidney D. Jackman to secure his wagon trains, but these had already been removed by order of General Price. Jackman was instead intercepted by General Fagan, who alerted him to the massed Union cavalry (Pleasonton's) which had just crossed the Big Blue River to the east. Seeing Pleasanton's close proximity to the Confederate flank and rear, General Curtis had ordered a general advance of the entire Union line, with Blair's and Jennison's brigades leading the charge. Shelby, meanwhile, had only Thompson's Iron Brigade to hold off this massive assault. When one of Pleasonton's batteries arrived in support of Curtis's men, Thompson's Confederates finally broke and fled.

Price's men set fire to prairie grass in the area to create a smoke screen to cover their withdrawal. Witnesses reported that the road was strewn with debris from the fleeing Rebel army.

The following day, Blunt and Pleasonton took up their pursuit of Price's remaining forces. They would chase Price through Kansas and southern Missouri, engaging him at the Marais des Cygnes, Mine Creek, the Marmiton River, and finally at Newtonia, forcing Price to withdraw into Indian Territory, from which he eventually returned to Arkansas via Texas, and ultimately leaving the Confederate leader with less than 6,000 survivors from his initial force of 12,000 when his campaign officially ended on November 1, 1864.

=== Aftermath ===
The Battle of Westport was one of the largest battles west of the Mississippi River, with over 30,000 troops involved. The Union victory put an end to Price's campaign for Missouri. Curtis wrote to Henry W. Halleck after the battle that "the victory at Westport was most decisive." The battle has accordingly been referred to as "The Gettysburg of the West". This greatly contested border state was now firmly under Union control, and would remain so until the end of the war.

Although never capturing Price or the tattered remnants of his army, Federal forces did manage to render the Army of Missouri incapable of any future significant operations. Indeed, Price's campaign would prove the last in the Trans-Mississippi Theater.

According to a recent book on Price's campaign, Kyle S. Sinisi's The Last Hurrah: Sterling Price's Missouri Expedition of 1864, historians have long exaggerated the casualties inflicted in the fighting around Westport on October 21–23, 1864. Sinisi's new estimates are that the Union forces lost 361 and the Confederates 510 men, killed, wounded, or captured, on October 23. However, most sources give the total casualties as 3,000 men, about 1,500 Union and 1,500 Confederate. Another primary source gives an estimate of 400 casualties for the Union and 1,000 to 1,500 for the Confederacy.

== Noteworthy participants ==
Several participants in the battle later went on to gain national fame in other ways, many of them in the American Old West. Buffalo Bill Cody served as a private in the 7th Kansas Cavalry ("Jennison's Jayhawkers"). Wild Bill Hickok served as scout for General Curtis. Frederick Benteen, who assumed command of a brigade at Byram's Ford, would subsequently fight with George Custer at the Battle of Little Bighorn. Mountain man John "Liver Eating" Johnson (on whose life the movie Jeremiah Johnson was made) enlisted in the U.S. Navy before the war and on February 24, 1864, joined Company A, 3rd Regiment, Colorado Cavalry Volunteers "from depot in St. Louis." With that regiment, he fought for the Union at the Battle of Westport.

Three Union officers at Westport later served as post-war state governors: Samuel J. Crawford served as governor of Kansas, while John Lourie Beveridge became governor of Illinois. Thomas Theodore Crittenden served as governor of Missouri and was later buried in Forest Hill Cemetery, scene of fighting during Price's retreat from Westport. Serving in the Kansas Militia during the battle was Kansas State Treasurer David. H. Heflebower who helped found the Peoples Party in Kansas and was a leader in the Greenback and later Union Labor Parties. Senators Jim Lane and Samuel C. Pomeroy served on Curtis's staff while future U.S. Senators Preston B. Plumb and Edmund G. Ross served as Federal officers.

Former lieutenant governor Thomas C. Reynolds joined Gen. Price's staff, in hopes that Price's army might capture Jefferson City and install him as governor of a Confederate regime in Missouri. Price had served as a prewar governor, while Marmaduke later served as a post-war governor of Missouri.

== Memorials ==
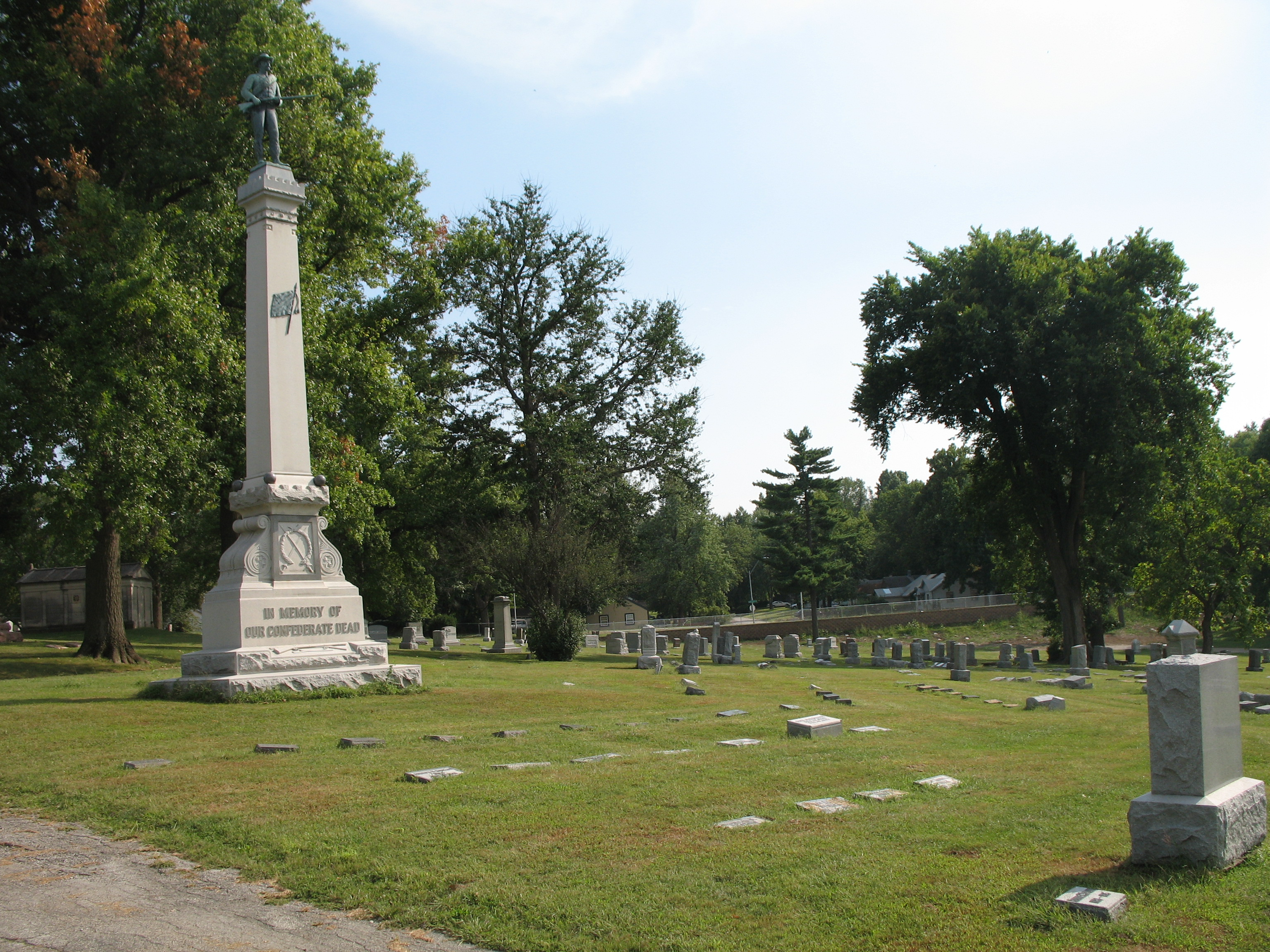
Memorial to Confederate dead on the high ground at Forest Hill Cemetery, Kansas City. Joseph O. Shelby was buried by the memorial; Waldo P. Johnson is buried behind it.

Although many signs and placards commemorating some aspect of the Battle of Westport are present throughout Kansas City today, the main battle monument is located in the Sunset Hill neighborhood just south of the Country Club Plaza. Because the center of the main battlefield comprises present-day Loose Park and a portion of the upper (Wornall) campus of The Pembroke Hill School, the memorial is at the southern end of Loose Park, along West 55th Street.

The Battle of Westport Museum and Visitor Center, located in Swope Park, depicts the experiences of the soldiers and civilians during the three days of the battle.

A Battle of Westport Driving Tour starts in Westport at Kelly's Westport Inn, the oldest standing building in Kansas City, Missouri. It consists of a series of placards, one at each stop, giving both a detailed history of what occurred there and directions to the next stop. Stops along the self-guided tour include the Wornall House, which served as a hospital during the battle, and Forest Hill Cemetery, the final resting place of many men and officers of General Joseph Shelby's "Iron Brigade", including General Shelby himself.

The Trailside Center museum in Kansas City has several exhibits and research material related to the battle.

== Battlefield preservation ==
Cover of The Battle of Westport, by Paul B. Jenkins, published in 1906

The first steps toward memorializing the Battle of Westport came early in the twentieth century. In 1906, local historian Paul Jenkins published his account of the conflict, The Battle of Westport. The Byram's Ford engagement was reenacted in Swope Park in 1912. During the 1920s, civic leaders under H. H. Crittenden of the Missouri Valley Historical Society conceived a plan to save the Westport battle sites near present-day Loose Park and Byram's Ford. Crittenden's father was Col. Thomas Crittenden, who led one of the Union cavalry brigades at the Byram's Ford battle, and later served as governor of Missouri. The mayor and council of Kansas City passed ordinances recognizing these sites; this was followed by the introduction of a bill in 1924 in the United States Congress to create a National Military Park. This endeavor proved unsuccessful, and memorial efforts ceased for several years. During the 1950s, much of the battlefield was disturbed by commercial and industrial construction, though the developer of one industrial complex did erect a memorial near the historic route of the Byram's Ford Road.

On the eve of the Civil War centennial in 1958, the Civil War Round Table of Kansas City was formed with former President Harry S. Truman as a charter member. Dr. Howard N. Monnett, a member of this Round Table, researched, spoke and wrote extensively about what he termed the "action before Westport". His book of that title was published in 1964 for the battle's centennial. Dr. Monnett's enthusiasm led to the eventual creation of an automobile tour of the widely dispersed battle sites. By 1979, the founders of the Monnett Fund had successfully raised funds to erect permanent markers at 25 sites, and had created a self-guided automobile tour. These markers included a monument located at the meadow site, and several wayside markers on nearby Bloody Hill. The battlefield was entered on the National Register of Historic Places in 1989, after the Fund acquired 50 acres (200,000 m^{2}) of the Westport battlefield, including the site of Byram's Ford itself. Title was transferred to the Kansas City Parks Department in April 1995, and archaeological surveys in 1996 revealed artifacts from the battle in and around the Byram's Ford area.

== See also ==
- List of American Civil War battles
- List of battles 1801–1900
- Troop engagements of the American Civil War, 1864
