= A48 =

A48 may refer to:

- A48 motorway (France), a road connecting the A43 and Grenoble
- A48 road (Great Britain), a road connecting Gloucester, England and Carmarthen, Wales
- Autovía A-48, a motorway under construction connecting Cadiz and Algeciras, Spain
- East Indian Defence, Encyclopaedia of Chess Openings code

A 48 may refer to:

- Junkers A 48, a sport and school German aircraft built in 1929
