= 48th Brigade =

48th Brigade or 48th Infantry Brigade may refer to:

== British India ==
- 48th Indian Infantry Brigade

== Japan ==
- 48th Independent Mixed Brigade

== Ukraine ==
- 48th Artillery Brigade
- 48th Engineering Brigade

== United Kingdom ==
- 48th Brigade (United Kingdom)

== United States ==
- 48th Chemical Brigade
- 48th Infantry Brigade Combat Team

== See also ==
- 48th Division (disambiguation)
- 48th Regiment (disambiguation)
