= 48th Regiment =

48th Regiment may refer to:

- 48th (Northamptonshire) Regiment of Foot
- 48th Arkansas Infantry (Mounted)
- 48th Artillery Regiment "Taro"
- 48th Highlanders of Canada
- 48th Illinois Infantry Regiment
- 48th Indiana Infantry Regiment
- 48th Infantry Regiment (United States)
- 48th Infantry Regiment "Ferrara"
- 48th Kentucky Mounted Infantry Regiment
- 48th Massachusetts Infantry Regiment
- 48th Mississippi Infantry Regiment
- 48th Ohio Infantry Regiment
- 48th Pennsylvania Infantry Regiment
- 48th United States Colored Infantry Regiment
- 48th Wisconsin Infantry Regiment
