= Second Battle of Newtonia Site =

- U.S. National Register of Historic Places
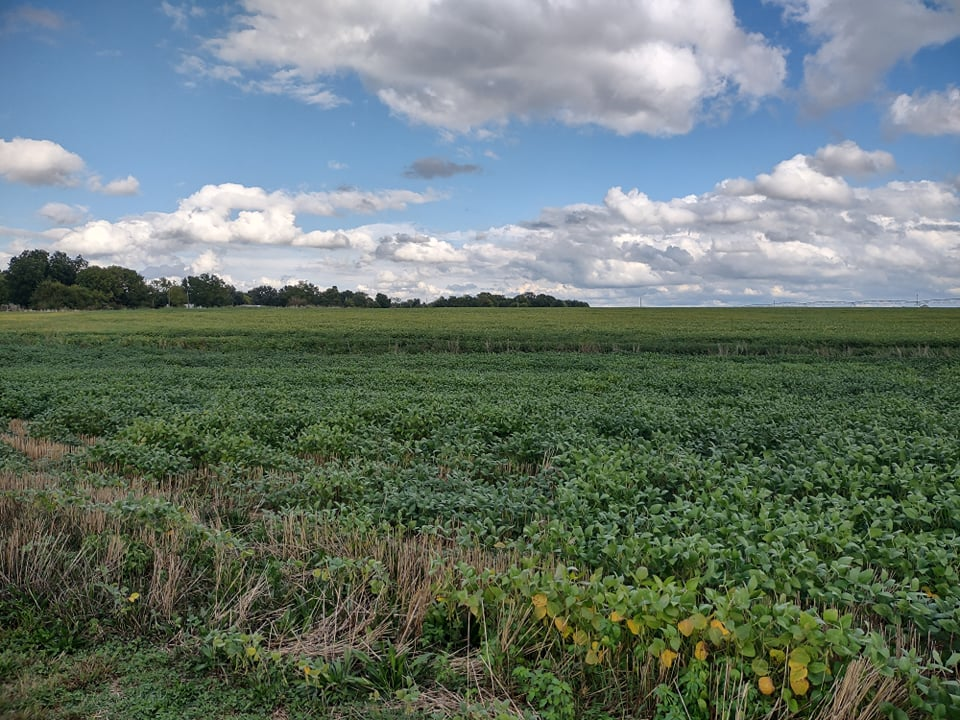
- Field on the eastern edge of the site

- Location within Missouri Location within the United States
- Nearest city: Newtonia, Missouri
- Coordinates: 36.8739°N 94.1903°W
- Area: 560 acres (230 ha)
- NRHP reference No.: 04000698
- Added to NRHP: December 23, 2004

The Second Battle of Newtonia Site is a battlefield listed on the National Register of Historic Places (NRHP) near Newtonia and Stark City in Missouri. In late 1864, Major General Sterling Price of the Confederate States Army began a raid into Missouri in hopes of diverting Union troops away from more important theaters of the American Civil War. After a defeat at the Battle of Westport on October 23, Price's Army of Missouri began retreating through Kansas, but suffered three consecutive defeats on October 25. By October 28, the retreating Confederates had reached Newtonia, where the Second Battle of Newtonia broke out when Union pursuers caught up with the Confederates. Confederate cavalry under Brigadier General Joseph O. Shelby was initially successful, but after Union reinforcements under Brigadier General John B. Sanborn counterattacked, the Confederates withdrew. The Union troops did not pursue, and Price's men escaped, eventually reaching Texas by December.

In 2004, the site of the battle was listed on the NRHP. The site consists of four contributing properties: the battlefield proper, a cornfield near the Mathew H. Ritchey House, a Union artillery position north of the main battlefield site, and a portion of the Granby Road. Most of the battlefield is located within the site, although some outlying portions are not well preserved and are not included. Several noncontributing properties are located within the site, including a bakery and a silo. While railroad construction, open-pit mining, and the development of Stark City have encroached on the site, it is considered to be well-preserved. A 2013 study determined that the battlefield was not significant enough for National Park Service management, but 25 acres were added to Wilson's Creek National Battlefield in 2022.

== History ==
=== Context ===
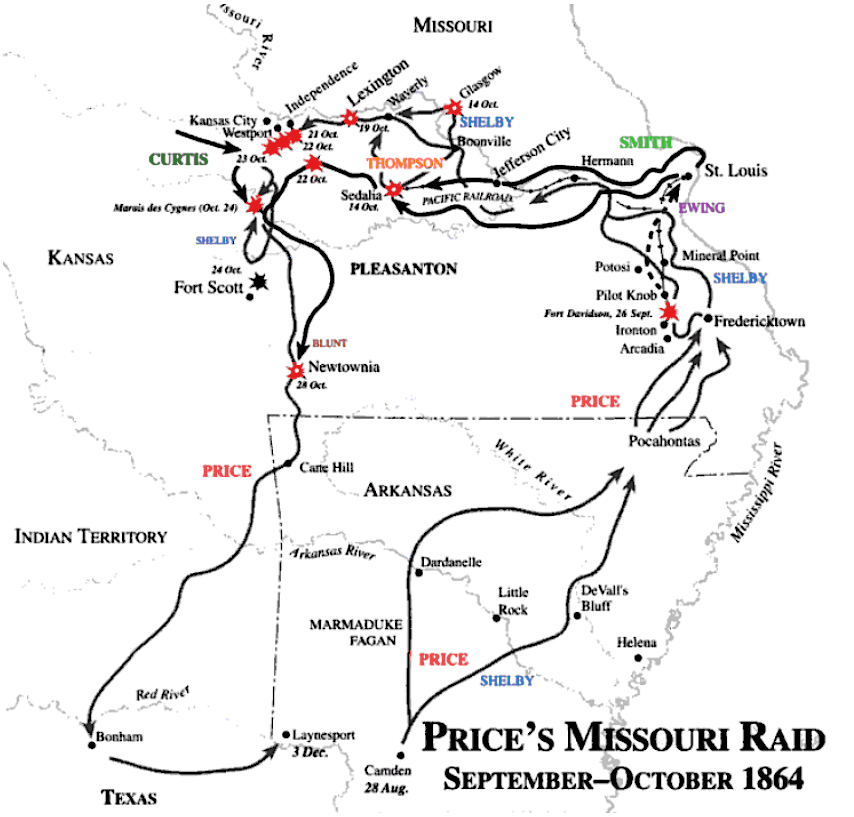
Map of Price's Raid

By the beginning of September 1864, the American Civil War had been continuing for several years, and events in the eastern United States, especially the Confederate defeat in the Atlanta campaign, gave President of the United States Abraham Lincoln, who supported continuing the war, an edge in the 1864 United States Presidential Election over George B. McClellan, who promoted ending the war. At this point, the Confederacy had very little chance of winning the war. As events east of the Mississippi River turned against the Confederates, General Edmund Kirby Smith, commander of the Trans-Mississippi Department, was ordered to transfer the infantry under his command to the fighting in the Eastern and Western Theaters. However, this proved to be impossible, as the Union Navy controlled the Mississippi River, preventing a large scale crossing. Despite having limited resources for an offensive, Smith decided that an attack designed to divert Union troops from the principal theaters of combat would have the same effect as the proposed transfer of troops. Major General Sterling Price and the Confederate Governor of Missouri Thomas Caute Reynolds suggested that an invasion into the state of Missouri would be an effective offensive; Smith approved the plan and appointed Price to command the offensive. Price expected that the offensive would create a popular uprising against Union control of Missouri, divert Union troops away from principal theaters of combat (many of the Union troops previously defending Missouri had been transferred out of the state, leaving the Missouri State Militia to be the state's primary defensive force), and aid McClellan's chance of defeating Lincoln; on September 19, Price's column entered the state.

Originally, Price and his Army of Missouri had hoped to capture St. Louis, but a defeat at the Battle of Pilot Knob in late September dissuaded the Confederates from assaulting that city. Jefferson City, a secondary target, was deemed to strong to attack in early October, so the Confederates began moving westwards towards Kansas City. During the movement, the Army of Missouri collected supplies during side raids such as the Battle of Glasgow, although Major General William S. Rosecrans, commander of the Union Department of the Missouri, began mobilizing troops against Price. By October 23, Union Major General Samuel R. Curtis and the Army of the Border caught up with Price near Kansas City and badly defeated him in the Battle of Westport. The Army of Missouri then began retreating through Kansas, but was forced to fight three battles–Marais des Cygnes, Mine Creek, and Marmiton River. Mine Creek in particular was a disastrous rout in which large quantities of supplies and soldiers were captured. On October 28, Price halted his retreat near Newtonia, Missouri, hoping to give his weary men a rest.

=== Second Battle of Newtonia ===
Price's main camp was south of Newtonia, although a small skirmish line was aligned to the west of the town. Major General James G. Blunt's command approached around 14:00, and opened fire with artillery. The Confederates were caught by surprise, but Brigadier General Joseph O. Shelby deployed his cavalrymen dismounted to meet Blunt's threat. Both sides then formed into lines of battle, and began an artillery duel. Blunt had four 3-inch ordnance rifles and two mountain howitzers, while Shelby had two 10-pounder Parrott rifles. Shelby soon ordered a counterattack. While fire from the mountain howitzers allowed the Union right to hold, part of the Confederate line outflanked Blunt's left. The Union soldiers fell back to a line near the Mathew H. Ritchey farm and reformed. One of the Union batteries was repositioned to a supporting role northwest of the town; meanwhile, Shelby's men reorganized and prepared for another attack. With his ammunition running low, Blunt was considering ordering a withdrawal from the field when he was reinforced by the command of Brigadier General John B. Sanborn.

Sanborn aligned his brigade to the left of Blunt's line, and after waiting for his cavalrymen to dismount, ordered an assault. Encouraged by the advance of Sanborn's brigade, Blunt's men joined in the fight. Additional Union artillery had arrived with Sanborn, increasing the Confederates' artillery disadvantage to two guns against eight. Facing a freshly reinforced and suddenly aggressive foe, Shelby ordered a withdrawal. A small detachment from Major General James F. Fagan's division arrived during the retreat to support Shelby, but by then, the battle was already lost. The Confederates withdrew to some woods south of Newtonia, but were not pursued. Curtis, who had arrived on the field, and Blunt decided not to pursue until the next morning, due to the fatigue of their men. Both Blunt and Shelby claimed victory. Estimates of casualties incurred during the fighting vary significantly: one modern source places Union casualties at 26 and those of the Confederates at 24, while a period newspaper reported 113 Union casualties and "less than 200" for the Confederates. Price continued his retreat after Newtonia, reaching Arkansas by October 30. Curtis continued pursuing the Confederates until Price reached the Arkansas River on November 8. The Army of Missouri did not stop its retreat until it reached Texas; by December, less than a third of the men Price had taken into Missouri remained in his army.

== Features ==
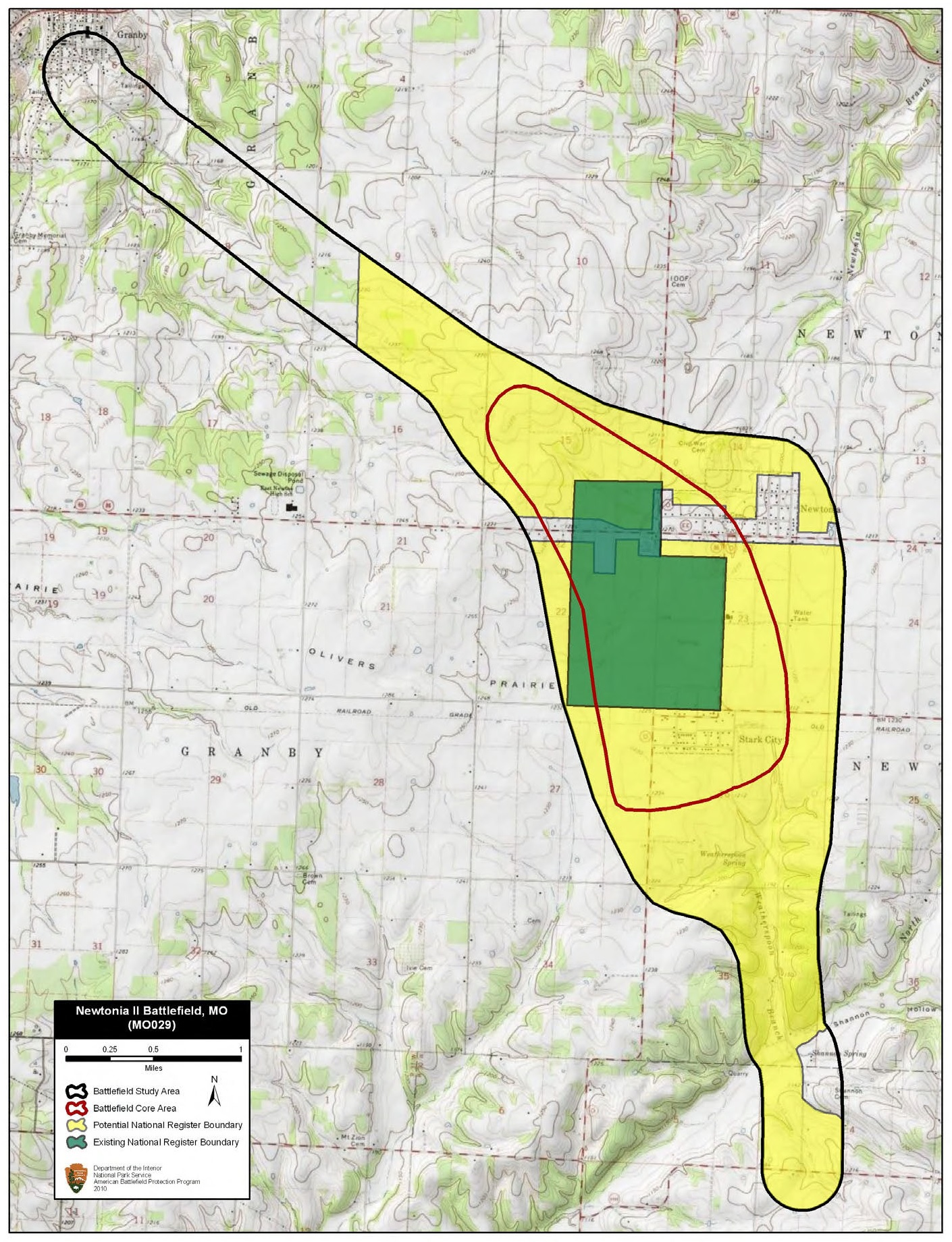
Map of the Second Battle of Newtonia battle area

The site was listed on the National Register of Historic Places (NRHP) on December 23, 2004, as the Second Battle of Newtonia Site, with a NRHP register number of 4000698. While the town of Stark City has been developed since the battle was fought, land use patterns at the site are still primarily agricultural. The site of the battlefield itself suffered disruption when the Missouri and North Arkansas Railroad was constructed in the early 20th century. Tailings from open-pit mining also intrude on the site, but are not particularly noticeable from the ground. While the roads used at the time of the battle are no longer in use and some small stone walls present in 1864 have disappeared, the site's NRHP application form noted that landscape appearance was similar to what it was during the battlefield. A road runs through the southern portion of the site, but it also provides a vantage point for open views of the field.

Four contributing properties make up the district. The first is defined as the overall battlefield. Most of the primary fighting area of the battle is included in this property, which encompasses .87 square miles (2.3 km^{2}), the majority of which is in private hands. Some isolated fringes of the fighting occurred south of the modern-day location of Stark City, although the ground there is not well preserved and is not part of the NRHP site. The second district is the Ritchey cornfield. While Ritchey farmed 56 acres (23 ha) of corn in 1864, only 26 acres (11 ha) are part of the historic site. The cornfield site is located at the intersection of Missouri Route 86 and Missouri Supplemental Route O and is still used for agricultural purposes. North of Route 86 and the main battle site is a contributing property preserving the Union artillery position on the ridge. The final contributing property is the former site of the Granby Road near the artillery site; while the road no longer exists, its track has been identified through archaeology and the presence of a hedgerow. In addition to the contributing properties; a bakery, a machine shop, a silo, and 17 houses and outbuildings are located within the site, mainly on its edges. The site's boundaries include most of the core area of the battlefield. While the Second Battle of Newtonia Site is distinct from the First Battle of Newtonia Historic District, the two NRHP properties' boundaries touch at two points.

The American Battlefield Trust has preserved 8 acres (3.2 ha) at Newtonia, and additional land is preserved by the Newtonia Battlefields Association. After the site was listed on the NRHP, the National Park Service (NPS) conducted an analysis to determine if the location was suitable for inclusion in the NPS's list of official units, but the study determined that while the site was well-preserved, it did not rise to the level of importance that would warrant NPS preservation as a site characteristic of either the American Civil War as a whole, Price's Raid, or through association with Price, which the study noted as an important historical figure. The Ritchey House and 25 acres of the battlefields including the Old Newtonia Cemetery were added to Wilson's Creek National Battlefield in 2022 by the Consolidated Appropriations Act, 2023, despite National Park Service opposition due to the lack of connection, need for protection, or enhancement of public enjoyment.

== Sources ==
- Collins, Charles D. Jr. (2016). Battlefield Atlas of Price's Missouri Expedition of 1864 (PDF). Fort Leavenworth, Kansas: Combat Studies Institute Press. ISBN 978-1-940804-27-9.
- Kennedy, Frances H., ed. (1998). The Civil War Battlefield Guide (2nd ed.). Boston/New York: Houghton Mifflin. ISBN 978-0-395-74012-5.
- Stith, Matthew M.; Maserang, Roger (April 2004). "National Register of Historic Places Inventory Nomination Form: Second Battle of Newtonia Site" (PDF). Missouri Department of Natural Resources.
