= Moses W. Smith =

Confederate States Army officer (died 1864)

- Died: October 28, 1864; Newtonia, Missouri
- Cause of death: Mortally wounded in battle
- Military career
- Allegiance: Confederate States of America
- Service years: 1862–1864
- Rank: Colonel
- Commands: 11th Missouri Cavalry Regiment (Confederate); 6th Missouri Cavalry (Southwest Cavalry)
- Conflicts: American Civil War: Price's Missouri Expedition; Battle of Westport; Second Battle of Newtonia

Moses W. Smith was a Confederate States Army officer during the American Civil War. He served as the commander of the 11th Missouri Cavalry Regiment (Confederate), leading the unit during Price's Missouri Expedition in 1864. Smith was mortally wounded while leading his regiment from the front at the Second Battle of Newtonia.

== Military career ==
Before commanding his own regiment, Moses W. Smith began his Confederate service as a Major in the 6th Missouri Cavalry Regiment (Confederate), which was widely referred to in military records as the Southwest Cavalry. This initial unit was formed in the late spring of 1862 and drew its volunteers from the counties of Barry, Newton, McDonald, Jasper, and Lawrence. Under the command of officers like Colonel John T. Coffee and Gideon W. Thompson, the unit operated across Missouri and the Indian Territory. During the winter of 1863–1864, the unit absorbed a wave of new recruits, leading to a formal reorganization where it was officially redesignated as the 11th Missouri Cavalry Regiment (Confederate), and Smith was promoted to full Colonel to take operational command of the regiment.

=== Price's Missouri Expedition ===
In the autumn of 1864, Colonel Smith led the 11th Missouri Cavalry as part of General Joseph O. Shelby's Iron Brigade during Price's Missouri Expedition in 1864. As the Confederate army marched along the Russellville Road, Sterling Price dispatched subsidiary raiding columns to disrupt Union logistical lines. On October 8, 1864, General Shelby ordered Smith to lead his regiment north to target enemy supply routes. Smith's regiment attacked the Pacific Railroad line, wrecking tracks and burning vital bridge infrastructure for miles before encamping at California, Missouri, where they liberated the town of supplies. Smith concluded the day's operations along Moniteau Creek before reuniting with the main body of Shelby's division. Following this raid, Smith led the regiment through the Battle of Westport on October 23, 1864, and was documented in the Confederate order of battle during the subsequent retreat at the Battle of Mine Creek.

=== Death at Newtonia ===
Colonel Smith's military career came to an end on October 28, 1864, during the Second Battle of Newtonia. As General Price's retreating army stopped to rest, they were suddenly ambushed by Union cavalry under Major General James G. Blunt. Fearing that the numerical advantage of the Union artillery would overwhelm his positions, General Shelby ordered an aggressive flanking maneuver across the McClain farm. Participating directly in Brigadier General M. Jeff Thompson's attacking brigade, Colonel Smith led the 11th Missouri Cavalry into the charge from the very front of the line. While the charge pushed Union lines back 200 yards to the Ritchey Farm and forced the temporary retreat of McLain's Battery, Colonel Smith was mortally wounded during the battle and passed away.

== See also ==
- Confederate States Army
- American Civil War
- Price's Missouri Expedition
- Second Battle of Newtonia.
