= Brookline Village (disambiguation) =

Brookline Village is a commercial district in Brookline, Massachusetts.

Brookline Village may also refer to:

- Brookline Village (MBTA station), an MBTA station serving the district
- Brookline, Missouri, a former village
