= Brookline Township, Greene County, Missouri =

Inactive township in the US state of Missouri

Coordinates: 37.1444°N 93.4197°W

Brookline Township is an inactive township in Greene County, in the U.S. state of Missouri.

Brookline Township took its name from the community of Brookline, Missouri.

Much of Wilson's Creek National Battlefield is in the township.
