= 11th Missouri Cavalry Regiment (Confederate) =

- A surviving 1864 Missouri Battle Flag used by consolidated Missouri units under General Price.
- Active: Winter 1863–1864 — June 1865
- Disbanded: June 1865
- Country: Confederate States of America
- Branch: Confederate States Army
- Type: Cavalry
- Part of: Shelby's Brigade, Trans-Mississippi Department
- Engagements: American Civil War: First Battle of Newtonia (1862); Battle of Prairie Grove (1862); Marmaduke's Expedition into Missouri (1863); Battle of Helena, Arkansas (1863); Shelby's Raid (1863); Battle of Byram's Ford (1864); Battle of Westport (1864); Battle of Mine Creek (1864); Second Battle of Newtonia (1864)

Commanders
- Notable commanders: Colonel John T. Coffee; Colonel Gideon W. Thompson; Colonel Moses W. Smith

The 11th Missouri Cavalry Regiment was a cavalry regiment that served in the Confederate States Army during the American Civil War.

Originally organized in 1862 as the 6th Missouri Cavalry Regiment, the unit was reinforced and officially redesignated as the 11th Missouri Cavalry during the winter of 1863–1864.

Operating primarily within the Trans-Mississippi Department, the regiment was a core element of Brigadier General Joseph O. Shelby's brigade and fought extensively across Missouri, Arkansas, and the Indian Territory until the end of the conflict.

== Organization and origins ==
The regiment's history began in the late spring and summer of 1862 when it was initially raised as Colonel Coffee's Regiment, Missouri Cavalry, subsequently organized as the 6th Missouri Cavalry Regiment (also known colloquially as the "Southwest Cavalry"). The unit drew the vast majority of its recruits from the southwestern Missouri counties of Barry, Newton, McDonald, Jasper, and Lawrence.

During the winter of 1863–1864, the command absorbed a significant influx of new recruits. To account for its expanded size and restructuring, the Confederate War Department officially redesignated the unit as the 11th Missouri Cavalry Regiment.

== Operational history ==
Prior to its redesignation, the core cadre of the regiment took part in several critical actions in the Western Theater, including Marmaduke's Expedition into Missouri and the Battle of Helena in Arkansas. They also participated heavily in Shelby's early cavalry raids across Arkansas and Missouri.

== Price's Missouri Expedition (1864) ==
The 11th Missouri Cavalry saw its heaviest combat during Major General Sterling Price's 1864 expedition through Missouri. Assigned to Shelby's Iron Brigade, the regiment acted as an aggressive raiding and flanking force. As Union forces consolidated to block Price's advance, the 11th Cavalry fought in succession at the Battle of Byram's Ford and the Battle of Westport in October 1864. Following the Confederate defeat at Westport, the regiment acted as part of the rearguard during the retreat southward. During the disastrous Battle of Mine Creek in Kansas, the unit was engaged heavily as part of Thompson's Brigade under Brigadier General M. Jeff Thompson

Days later, during the Second Battle of Newtonia on October 28, 1864, the regiment took part in a desperate tactical counter-charge ordered by Shelby to relieve pinned-down Confederate lines. During this fierce engagement, the regiment's commanding officer, Colonel Moses W. Smith, was mortally wounded. Following the expedition, the battered remnants of the regiment retreated back into Arkansas and Texas, continuing operations until the formal surrender of the Trans-Mississippi Department in June 1865.

== Commanders ==
- Colonel John T. Coffee — Led the regiment during its early formation and its duration as the 6th Cavalry.
- Colonel Gideon W. Thompson — Supervised the regiment during its structural transition and official redesignation into the 11th Cavalry.
- Colonel Moses W. Smith — Commanded the regiment during Price's 1864 raid; killed in action at the Second Battle of Newtonia.
- Lieutenant Colonel James C. Hooper — Served as second-in-command and managed field operations during late-war regional actions.

== See also ==
- List of Missouri Confederate Civil War units
- Missouri in the American Civil War
