= Union Chapel Township, Christian County, Missouri =

Township in Christian County, Missouri, U.S.

Coordinates: 37.07034°N 93.34743°W

Union Chapel Township is a township in northern Christian County, Missouri.

The organization date and origin of the name of Union Chapel Township is unknown.

Wilson's Creek National Battlefield is partly in this township.
