= Young Brothers massacre =

1932 gun battle in Missouri, US

- Location: 37.185434°N 93.392542°W; Brookline, Missouri
- Date: January 2, 1932; 94 years ago
- Weapons: 12-gauge shotgun; .32-20 Winchester rifle
- Deaths: 6
- Perpetrator: Young brothers

The Young Brothers massacre (sometimes referred to as the Brookline shootout) was a gun battle that occurred outside of Brookline, Missouri (now part of Republic, Missouri) in the Ozarks region on the afternoon of January 2, 1932, during the period known as the "Public Enemy Era". It resulted in the deaths of six law enforcement officers, making it the worst single killing of police officers in American history, until the September 11 attacks in 2001. In 2024, the property that was the site of the massacre was demolished.

== Background ==
The Young brothers, Paul, Harry, and Jennings, were well known to the law enforcement officers of southwest Missouri in the 1920s as small-time thieves. Each served terms in the Missouri State Penitentiary at "Old Jeff" for burglary and theft, and Jennings and Paul also served terms at Leavenworth. By the late 1920s, the three had become household names with local law officers and had even earned the nickname of the 'Young Triumvirate'. The local authorities considered the brothers non-violent until June 2, 1929, when Harry Young and an accomplice murdered Mark Noe, City Marshal of Republic, Missouri, after Noe stopped Young for drunk driving. Harry Young then disappeared with his two brothers, allegedly living under a false name in Texas for two and a half years. The brothers established a grand-scale auto theft ring, later described by the FBI as one of the largest of its kind. However, the Youngs still valued family ties, and by the end of 1931, Harry and "Jinx" decided to visit their family farm in Missouri. On January 2, 1932, Sheriff Marcell Hendrix of Greene County, Missouri, received reliable information indicating that the two Young brothers were at their family's farm near Brookline, a small village not far from Springfield. Hendrix quickly assembled a posse of lawmen and set out for the farm. The ten police officers and one civilian who went to arrest the Young brothers were by today's standards woefully unprepared for the job; they carried no weapons other than handguns, and most had no spare ammunition on them.

== The massacre ==
Upon arriving at the farmhouse, the police officers assembled in the front yard and yelled for the brothers to come out. They received no response, but officer Ollie Crosswhite said he had heard a person walking around inside. Sheriff Hendrix ordered tear gas to be fired into the house, with no immediate result. At that point, Hendrix and his deputy sheriff, Wiley Mashburn, decided to kick down the back door of the house and enter the home. When they did so, two people, one armed with a 12-gauge shotgun and the other with a .32-20 Winchester rifle, opened fire from inside the house. (It is not completely clear who was in the house at the time of the gun battle, but all evidence points to the presence of Harry and Jennings Young.) Both Hendrix and Mashburn fell, mortally wounded. The officers outside began shooting into the windows of the house, while those inside continued to pour deadly fire on the exposed policemen. Another three officers, Tony Oliver, Sid Meadows, and Charles Houser were quickly gunned down. The surviving policemen, out of ammunition and pinned down, were forced to abandon their dead and dying comrades and flee for their lives. Unknown to the fleeing lawmen, Officer Crosswhite was still alive and uninjured, crouching behind a storm cellar at the rear of the house. Once the suspects inside the house became aware of Crosswhite's presence, one of them pinned him down with rifle fire while the other crept up behind him and killed him with a shotgun blast to the back of the head. While a relief party was being hastily formed in Springfield, the killers took both money and weapons from the fallen policemen and fled.

== The aftermath ==
A national manhunt immediately commenced, and the Young brothers were quickly tracked to a rented room in Houston, Texas. Houston police officers entered the home on January 5 and discovered the brothers had retreated to a bathroom. They called on the men inside to surrender, and were met with gunfire. After the officers returned fire, there was a period of silence, and then several shots were heard. A voice called out "We're dead-come on in". The officers found Jennings Young dead and Harry Young mortally wounded from multiple gunshot wounds. The guns taken from the murdered lawmen in Brookline were found on the bodies. The coroner's office in Houston concluded that the brothers had shot each other in a suicide pact to avoid capture. Some people later questioned this version of events, suspecting that the officers involved had in fact fired the fatal shots.

The Young Brothers Massacre was one of the events that persuaded law enforcement in the US to take a more professional and cautious approach to armed standoff situations, particularly those involving people suspected of previous violence towards police officers. A monument bearing the names of the six slain officers stands today in front of the police headquarters building in Springfield and in front of the Greene County Courts building.

== Popular culture ==
- ChappelLocke publishing of Springfield has issued a CD of songs inspired by this event, with narration.
- Terminus Pictures in Atlanta produced a docudrama written, directed and edited by Jim Hancock, and produced by Alex Mionie, based on the story, released in August 2018 and called Come On In We're Dead.

== See also ==
- List of rampage killers in the United States
