= Battle of Newtonia =

Battle of Newtonia may refer to two conflicts fought in Newton County, Missouri, during the American Civil War:

- First Battle of Newtonia, fought on September 30, 1862
- Second Battle of Newtonia, fought on October 28, 1864
