= Stark City, Missouri =

- Town
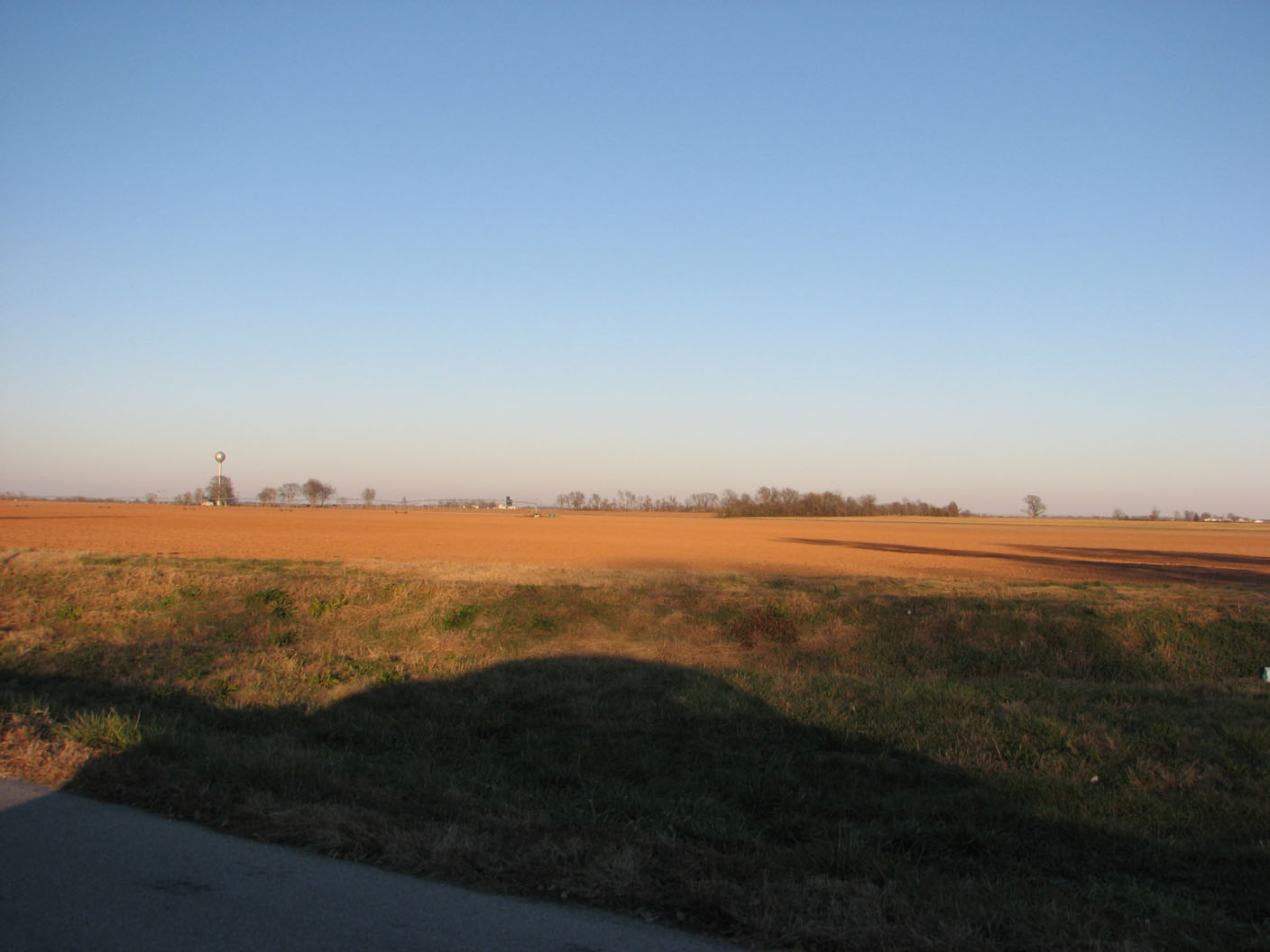
- Northeast view from Stark City

- Location of Stark City, Missouri
- Coordinates: 36°51′46″N 94°11′11″W
- Country: United States
- State: Missouri
- County: Newton

Area
  - Total: 0.33 sq mi (0.85 km^{2})
  - Land: 0.33 sq mi (0.85 km^{2})
  - Water: 0 sq mi (0.00 km^{2})
- Elevation: 1,224 ft (373 m)

Population (2020)
  - Total: 125
  - Density: 382.9/sq mi (147.83/km^{2})
- Time zone: UTC-6 (Central (CST))
  - Summer (DST): UTC-5 (CDT)
- ZIP code: 64866
- Area code: 417
- FIPS code: 29-70414
- GNIS feature ID: 2397678

Stark City is a town in Newton County, Missouri, United States. As of the 2020 census, Stark City had a population of 125. It is part of the Joplin, Missouri Metropolitan Statistical Area. It is adjacent to the battlefield of the Second Battle of Newtonia.

== History ==
The town formerly known as Chester was renamed in the 1930s to Stark City. A post office called Stark City has been in operation since 1912. The community has the name of William P. Stark, the proprietor of a local nursery.

== Geography ==
Stark City is located along Missouri Route 86, nine miles east of Neosho. Newtonia is one mile north and Fairview is approximately six miles east, along Route 86.

According to the United States Census Bureau, the village has a total area of 0.31 square miles (0.80 km^{2}), all land.

== Demographics ==
Historical population
| Census | Pop. | Note | %± |
|---|---|---|---|
| 1920 | 190 | | — |
| 1930 | 146 | | −23.2% |
| 1940 | 172 | | 17.8% |
| 1950 | 154 | | −10.5% |
| 1960 | 121 | | −21.4% |
| 1970 | 122 | | 0.8% |
| 1980 | 132 | | 8.2% |
| 1990 | 127 | | −3.8% |
| 2000 | 156 | | 22.8% |
| 2010 | 139 | | −10.9% |
| 2020 | 125 | | −10.1% |
U.S. Decennial Census

=== 2010 census ===
As of the census of 2010, there were 139 people, 60 households, and 39 families living in the village. The population density was 448.4 inhabitants per square mile (173.1/km^{2}). There were 72 housing units at an average density of 232.3 per square mile (89.7/km^{2}). The racial makeup of the village was 87.8% White, 1.4% African American, 1.4% Native American, 1.4% Asian, 2.2% from other races, and 5.8% from two or more races. Hispanic or Latino of any race were 2.2% of the population.

There were 60 households, of which 23.3% had children under the age of 18 living with them, 46.7% were married couples living together, 10.0% had a female householder with no husband present, 8.3% had a male householder with no wife present, and 35.0% were non-families. 30.0% of all households were made up of individuals, and 13.4% had someone living alone who was 65 years of age or older. The average household size was 2.32 and the average family size was 2.82.

The median age in the village was 42.6 years. 18.7% of residents were under the age of 18; 10.8% were between the ages of 18 and 24; 23.8% were from 25 to 44; 26.6% were from 45 to 64; and 20.1% were 65 years of age or older. The gender makeup of the village was 52.5% male and 47.5% female.

=== 2000 census ===
As of the census of 2000, there were 156 people, 59 households, and 42 families living in the town. The population density was 1,278.5 inhabitants per square mile (493.6/km^{2}). There were 62 housing units at an average density of 508.1 per square mile (196.2/km^{2}). The racial makeup of the town was 92.95% White, 2.56% Native American, and 4.49% from two or more races.

There were 59 households, out of which 32.2% had children under the age of 18 living with them, 59.3% were married couples living together, 6.8% had a female householder with no husband present, and 28.8% were non-families. 25.4% of all households were made up of individuals, and 13.6% had someone living alone who was 65 years of age or older. The average household size was 2.64 and the average family size was 3.10.

In the town the population was spread out, with 30.8% under the age of 18, 7.7% from 18 to 24, 28.2% from 25 to 44, 19.9% from 45 to 64, and 13.5% who were 65 years of age or older. The median age was 34 years. For every 100 females, there were 110.8 males. For every 100 females age 18 and over, there were 111.8 males.

The median income for a household in the town was $25,000, and the median income for a family was $27,083. Males had a median income of $29,375 versus $21,875 for females. The per capita income for the town was $13,311. About 13.3% of families and 15.9% of the population were below the poverty line, including 16.7% of those under the age of eighteen and none of those 65 or over.
