= Republic, Missouri =

- City
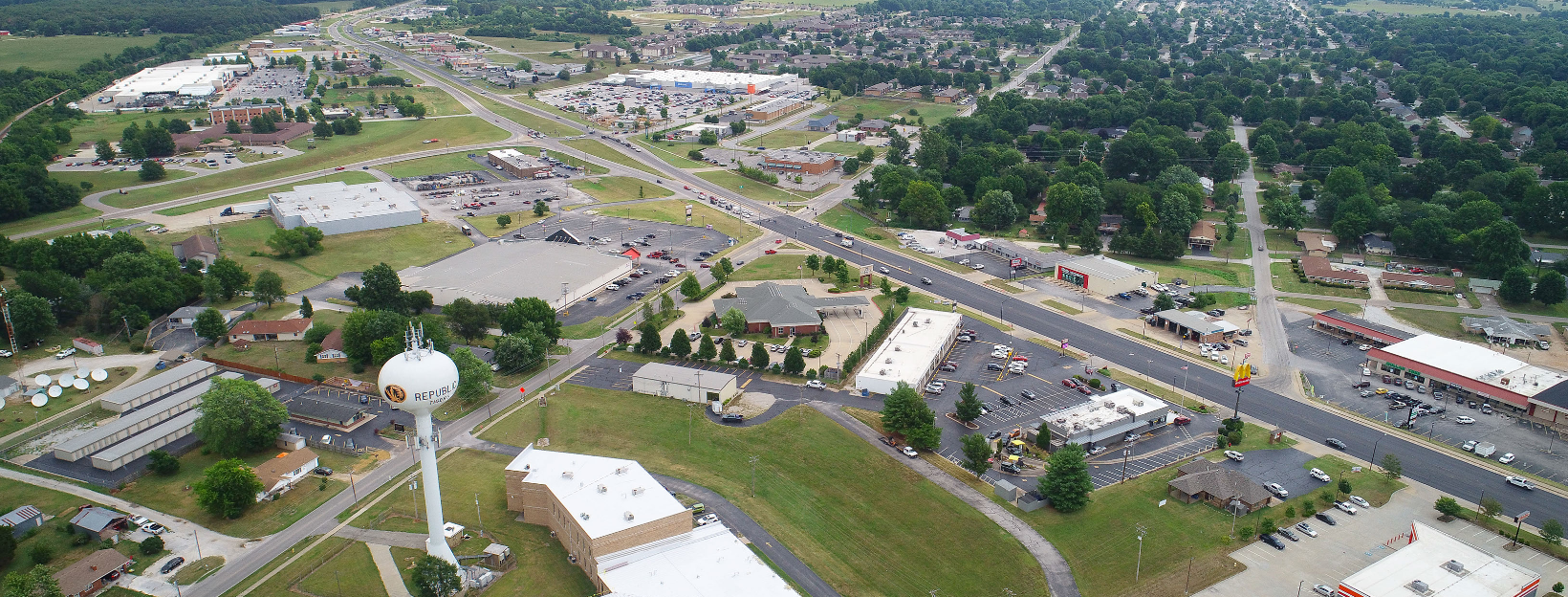

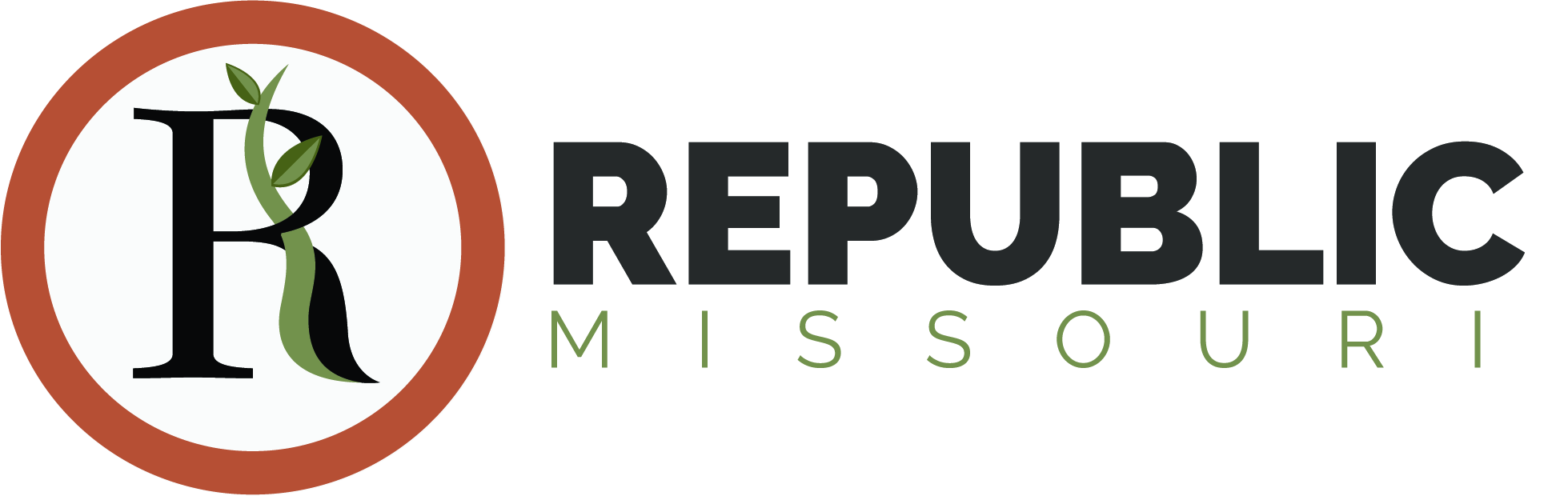
- Flag Seal
- Nickname: “RepMO”
- Location of Republic, Missouri
- Coordinates: 37°7′18″N 93°28′17″W
- Country: United States
- State: Missouri
- Counties: Christian, Greene
- Incorporated: 1871
- Consolidated: 2005

Government
  - Type: Mayor-City Council
  - Mayor: Eric Franklin
  - City Administrator: Colten Harris

Area
  - Total: 15.98 sq mi (41.40 km^{2})
  - Land: 15.98 sq mi (41.40 km^{2})
  - Water: 0.121366933 sq mi (0.314338913 km^{2})
- Elevation: 1,309 ft (399 m)

Population (2020)
  - Total: 18,750
  - Density: 1,172.9/sq mi (452.86/km^{2})
- Time zone: UTC-6 (Central (CST))
  - Summer (DST): UTC-5 (CDT)
- ZIP code: 65738
- Area code: 417
- FIPS code: 29-61238
- GNIS feature ID: 0725224
- Website: republicmo.com

Republic is a city in Christian and Greene counties in the U.S. state of Missouri. As of the 2020 census, the city's population was 18,750. In 2019, its population was 16,938, making it the second largest city in Greene County in the U.S. state of Missouri. It is also the fourth largest city in the Springfield, Missouri Metropolitan Area.

== History ==
Early settlement in southwest Greene County centered on the community of Little York. When the Atlantic & Pacific Railroad built a line through the area in the early 1870s, Little York was not on the route. Settlement moved two miles away to Brookline, which was on the rail line's route.

A group of settlers decided to take up residency at another area along the tracks just four miles southwest of Brookline. This village eventually became known as Republic, and was incorporated in 1871. While the railroad did go through Republic, there initially was no switch or depot located in the city. A public subscription of $1000 raised the funds to build a depot in the city. Subsequent growth is attributed to the depot's completion.

=== Consolidation with Village of Brookline ===
In 2005, the cities of Republic and Brookline consolidated, as Missouri State laws allow, after a vote of the residents of both communities approved the consolidation, with Republic taking over all aspects of city government. Originally, Brookline was to retain its own identity, but the city limit signs have since been changed to Republic's. However, according to Section I (b) of the Intergovernmental Agreement:

"Name of Consolidated Municipality - The name of the consolidated municipality shall be "City of Republic." To help preserve the identity of the Village, the City will place signs with text "Village of Brookline" at the current corporate limits of the Village. Placement of signage is subject to State sign regulations when placed in State right-of-way. The City of Republic will work with the United States Postal Service to help preserve the history and operation of the Brookline Station Post Office.

While the Village of Brookline no longer exists as an independent, incorporated community, the post office and associated ZIP Code of 65619 remain in operation. In addition, BNSF Railway continues to designate Brookline as a station point on its network map and system timetables.

=== Wilson's Creek National Battlefield ===
As a Border State in the American Civil War many of Missouri’s cities have a close history to the conflict. The area surrounding Republic was the site of the Battle of Wilson’s Creek and now works to preserve and commemorate the history of the battle. The battle of Wilson’s Creek was the first major battle fought west of the Mississippi River and a Southern victory. During this battle, Nathaniel Lyon was the first Union General killed in action to this point in the war. Now, the battlefield is a National Park and works to educate visitors on the history of the battle and the wider Civil War. These educational efforts include the preservation of the Ray House, public programs demonstrating Civil War medicine and artillery firing demonstrations, battle reenactments, and a Visitor Center & Museum.

== Geography ==
Republic is located at 37°7′18″N 94°28′17″W (37.121652, -93.471440). According to the United States Census Bureau, the city has a total area of 13.31 square miles (34.47 km^{2}), of which 13.30 square miles (34.45 km^{2}) is land and 0.01 square miles (0.03 km^{2}) is water. Most of the city lies in Greene County, and the rest is in Christian County.

== Demographics ==
Historical population
Census	Pop.	Note	%±
1880	81		—
1890	381		370.4%
1900	856		124.7%
1910	884		3.3%
1920	1,097		24.1%
1930	841		−23.3%
1940	790		−6.1%
1950	965		22.2%
1960	1,519		57.4%
1970	2,411		58.7%
1980	4,485		86.0%
1990	6,292		40.3%
2000	8,438		34.1%
2010	14,751		74.8%
2020	18,750		27.1%
U.S. Decennial Census

=== 2020 census ===
As of the 2020 census, Republic had a population of 18,750 and 7,080 households, including 4,620 families. The population density was 1,172.6 per square mile (452.9/km^{2}).

The median age was 33.2 years. 28.1% of residents were under the age of 18 and 13.1% of residents were 65 years of age or older. For every 100 females there were 92.5 males, and for every 100 females age 18 and over there were 88.4 males age 18 and over.

Of the city's residents, 95.9% lived in urban areas and 4.1% lived in rural areas.

There were 7,080 households, of which 40.2% had children under the age of 18 living in them. Of all households, 51.8% were married-couple households, 14.4% were households with a male householder and no spouse or partner present, and 25.7% were households with a female householder and no spouse or partner present. About 22.7% of all households were made up of individuals and 9.1% had someone living alone who was 65 years of age or older. The average household size was 2.5 and the average family size was 2.9.

There were 7,387 housing units, of which 4.2% were vacant. The homeowner vacancy rate was 1.7% and the rental vacancy rate was 5.8%.

Racial composition as of the 2020 census
Race	Number	Percent
White	16,478	87.9%
Black or African American	245	1.3%
American Indian and Alaska Native	114	0.6%
Asian	152	0.8%
Native Hawaiian and Other Pacific Islander	7	0.0%
Some other race	218	1.2%
Two or more races	1,536	8.2%
Hispanic or Latino (of any race)	704	3.8%

=== 2016–2020 American Community Survey ===
The 2016–2020 5-year American Community Survey estimates show that the median household income was $55,322 (with a margin of error of +/- $5,127) and the median family income was $63,293 (+/- $6,110). Males had a median income of $41,439 (+/- $2,785) versus $26,164 (+/- $2,835) for females. The median income for those above 16 years old was $32,497 (+/- $3,661). Approximately, 13.4% of families and 14.8% of the population were below the poverty line, including 18.3% of those under the age of 18 and 11.7% of those ages 65 or over.

=== 2010 census ===
As of the census of 2010, there were 14,751 people, 5,516 households, and 3,999 families living in the city. The population density was 1,109.1 inhabitants per square mile (428.2/km^{2}). There were 6,139 housing units at an average density of 461.6 per square mile (178.2/km^{2}). The racial makeup of the city was 95.6% White, 0.7% African American, 0.6% Native American, 0.5% Asian, 0.6% from other races, and 2.0% from two or more races. Hispanic or Latino people of any race were 2.2% of the population.

There were 5,516 households, of which 42.3% had children under the age of 18 living with them, 54.2% were married couples living together, 13.0% had a female householder with no husband present, 5.2% had a male householder with no wife present, and 27.5% were non-families. 22.2% of all households were made up of individuals, and 8.1% had someone living alone who was 65 years of age or older. The average household size was 2.64 and the average family size was 3.09.

The median age in the city was 32.2 years. 29.6% of residents were under the age of 18; 8.2% were between the ages of 18 and 24; 30.9% were from 25 to 44; 20.5% were from 45 to 64; and 10.7% were 65 years of age or older. The gender makeup of the city was 47.7% male and 52.3% female.

=== 2000 census ===
As of the census of 2000, there were 8,438 people, 3,148 households, and 2,379 families living in the city. The population density was 1,508.1 inhabitants per square mile (582.3/km^{2}). There were 3,298 housing units at an average density of 589.4 per square mile (227.6/km^{2}). The racial makeup of the city was 97.43% White, 0.24% African American, 0.56% Native American, 0.49% Asian, 0.02% Pacific Islander, 0.24% from other races, and 1.03% from two or more races. Hispanic or Latino of any race were 1.04% of the population.

There were 3,148 households, out of which 41.1% had children under the age of 18 living with them, 59.7% were married couples living together, 12.4% had a female householder with no husband present, and 24.4% were non-families. 20.8% of all households were made up of individuals, and 8.9% had someone living alone who was 65 years of age or older. The average household size was 2.63 and the average family size was 3.04.

In the city, the population was spread out, with 28.7% under the age of 18, 8.1% from 18 to 24, 32.0% from 25 to 44, 18.9% from 45 to 64, and 12.3% who were 65 years of age or older. The median age was 33 years. For every 100 females, there were 88.2 males. For every 100 females age 18 and over, there were 82.1 males.

The median income for a household in the city was $34,611, and the median income for a family was $37,622. Males had a median income of $30,849 versus $21,725 for females. The per capita income for the city was $15,212. About 5.8% of families and 6.7% of the population were below the poverty line, including 7.8% of those under age 18 and 10.2% of those age 65 or over.

== Transportation ==
Republic is located on U.S. Highway 60. Through the city limits, U.S. 60 runs concurrent with Missouri Route 413. Interstate 44 skirts the northern city limits. Missouri Route 360 (future Interstate 244), also known as James River Freeway, begins at an interchange with I-44 north of the city limit and heads east to the U.S. 60 interchange. From here, eastward, the freeway takes on the U.S. 60 designation.

The city is served by BNSF Railway, formerly the Burlington Northern Railroad. The railroad's Cherokee Subdivision runs through the community on its route between Tulsa, Oklahoma and Memphis, Tennessee. When combined with other subdivisions, this route makes up an important corridor linking California with Birmingham and Atlanta. Primary commodities carried on trains include freight and intermodal shipments. Passenger trains stopped running through the community in 1967.

== Education ==
=== Primary and secondary education ===
Republic is part of Republic R-III School District. The district has the following schools:

- Republic High School
- Republic Middle School
- Lyon Elementary
- McCulloch Elementary
- Price Elementary
- Schofield Elementary
- Sweeny Elementary
- Republic Early Childhood Center

School sports and other activities are available for middle and high school students, including football, volleyball, band, choir, academic and specialty clubs, and robotics.

=== Controversies ===
On July 25, 2011, the school board elected to ban two books from the school library. Twenty Boy Summer by Sarah Ockler and Slaughterhouse-Five by Kurt Vonnegut were slated for removal in deference to a complaint by a local resident, a professor at Missouri State University whose own children are homeschooled. The resident claimed the contents of the books are profane and violate the teachings of the Bible. The books were removed on grounds of violating the board's guidelines on book content.

=== Higher education ===
Ozarks Technical Community College opened its Republic Center in August 2020. The center serves as a satellite campus, offering multiple degree programs to Republic and the surrounding communities.

== Notable people ==
- Stephen R. Bough, federal judge, Western District of Missouri
- Charles Harrison Brown, two-term U.S. representative from Missouri's 7th congressional district 1957–1961
- Ross Carter, American football player
- Lester E. Cox, businessman, namesake of CoxHealth

== See also ==
- National Register of Historic Places listings in Greene County, Missouri
- Wilson's Creek National Battlefield
- Young Brothers Massacre
- Brookline, Missouri
