= Wilson's Creek National Battlefield =

National battlefield in Missouri, United States

- IUCN category III (natural monument or feature)
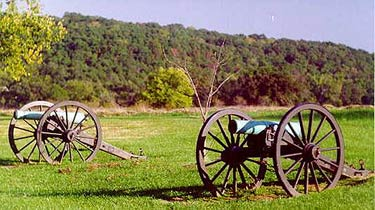

- Location within Missouri Location within the United States
- Location: Greene County, Missouri, USA
- Nearest city: Republic, Missouri
- Coordinates: 37°6′56″N 93°25′12″W
- Area: 2,433 acres (9.85 km^{2})
- Established: April 22, 1960; 66 years ago
- Visitors: 370,558 (in 2025)
- Governing body: National Park Service
- Website: Wilson's Creek National Battlefield
- Wilson's Creek National Battlefield
- U.S. National Register of Historic Places
- NRHP reference No.: 66000113 (original); 100009403 (increase)

Significant dates
- Added to NRHP: October 15, 1966
- Boundary increase: September 16, 2024

Wilson's Creek National Battlefield, located near Republic, Missouri, preserves the site of the Battle of Wilson's Creek. Fought on August 10, 1861, the battle was the first major American Civil War engagement west of the Mississippi River. In the battle, a Confederate army commanded by Benjamin McCulloch and Sterling Price defeated a smaller Union army commanded by Nathaniel Lyon. However, the Confederates were unable to hold much of Missouri, and a Confederate defeat at the Battle of Pea Ridge effectively solidified Union control of the state. Major features include a five-mile automobile tour loop, the restored 1852 Ray House, and "Bloody Hill", the site of the final stage of the battle. The site is located near Republic in southwestern Missouri just southwest of the city of Springfield. It has been a unit of the National Park Service since 1960, and was listed on the National Register of Historic Places in 1966.

== Battle at Wilson's Creek ==
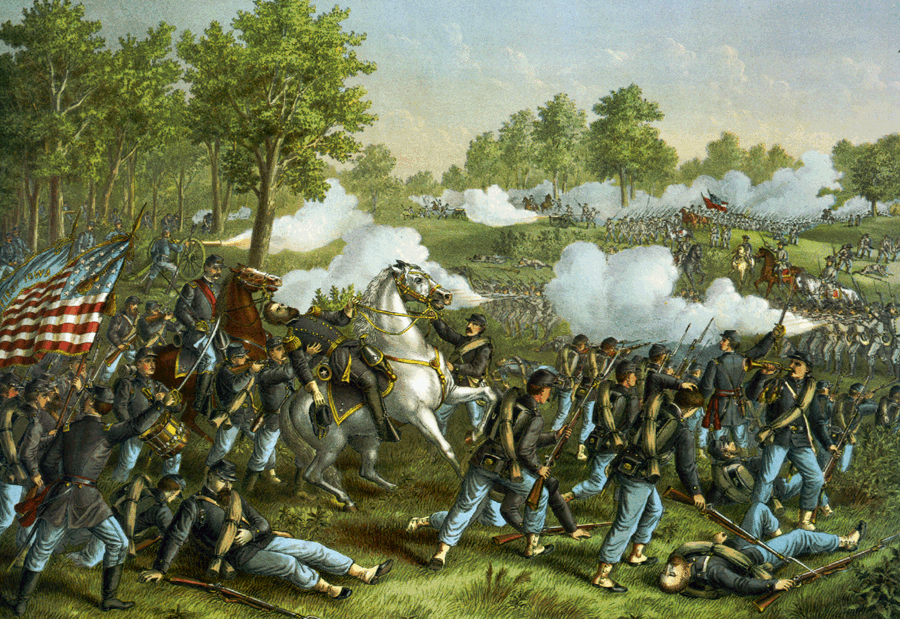
Battle of Wilson's Creek, by Kurz and Allison, 1893.

In early 1861, President Abraham Lincoln issued a call for the state of Missouri to enlist four regiments to fight against the Confederate States of America. However, then-Missouri governor Claiborne F. Jackson, a supporter of the Confederate States of America, refused to distribute the call and prepared, instead, to use the Missouri State Guard to seize a United States government arsenal in St. Louis, Missouri. In response, Union general Nathaniel Lyon moved aggressively against the pro-Confederate Guard, driving the force away from St. Louis and removing Jackson from official government leadership. The Missouri State Guard, now commanded by Sterling Price, fell back towards the city of Springfield in southwestern Missouri, followed by Lyon and his Union army.

Meanwhile, Price had been reinforced by a small Confederate army under the command of Benjamin McCulloch. On August 10, Lyon decided to attack Price and McCulloch's combined forces while the Confederate were encamped along the banks of Wilson's Creek. Lyon split his outnumbered forces into wings commanded by himself and Col. Franz Sigel in order to attack the Confederate camp from both the front and the rear. Sigel's force was soon driven from the field, allowing Price and McCulloch to combine their forces against Lyon's column, which had taken position on Bloody Hill. Lyon was killed, and the Union forces retreated from the field. It was the first major military engagement in the American Civil War to take place west of the Mississippi river.

After the battle, Price and McCulloch strongly disagreed over command issues. Price would move towards Kansas, fearing a counterstroke from Union troops there, leaving McCulloch with an army that soon dwindled after terms of enlistments expired and some of the remaining troops were reassigned elsewhere. Price followed up Wilson's Creek with a strike northwards towards the Missouri River, and was victorious at the Siege of Lexington. However, news that Union troops were marching to intercept his army led Price to retreat back towards Springfield. In March of the next year, Price and McCulloch would command wings of a Confederate army under the command of Earl Van Dorn at the Battle of Pea Ridge, Arkansas. The Confederate army was defeated and McCulloch was killed. The defeat at Pea Ridge ended any serious Confederate chance of holding a position in Missouri.

== Park history ==
The battle site was established as Wilson's Creek National Battlefield Park on April 22, 1960, and was re-designated a National Battlefield on December 16, 1970. The battlefield was listed on the National Register of Historic Places on October 15, 1966. The official area of the park was expanded by 615 acres in 2004 in accordance with Public Law 108-394, and an additional 60 acres were added in 2018 after the land was purchased by the American Battlefield Trust, formerly known as The Civil War Trust.

The park is located near Republic, Missouri, which is southwest of Springfield in Greene County, Missouri. The American Battlefield Trust and its partners have acquired and preserved 278 acres (1.13 km^{2}) of the battlefield, most of which has been sold to the National Park Service and incorporated into the park. In total, the park preserves 1,750 acres (76,000,000 sq ft) of the battlefield.

== Features ==
The portion of the park in Greene County is in Brookline Township. The portion in Christian County is divided between Lincoln Township and Union Chapel Township.

Wilson's Creek National Battlefield is open seven days a week from 8 a.m. to 5 p.m. The visitor center contains exhibits about the battle, a short film, fiber optic maps and a bookstore. The battlefield is accessed by a five-mile long self-guided automobile-tour loop, which connects eight stops highlighting historically important facets of the battlefield. The tour loop also features hiking trails and a seven-mile long horseback riding trail. On August 10, the anniversary of the battle, the park hosts commemorative events.

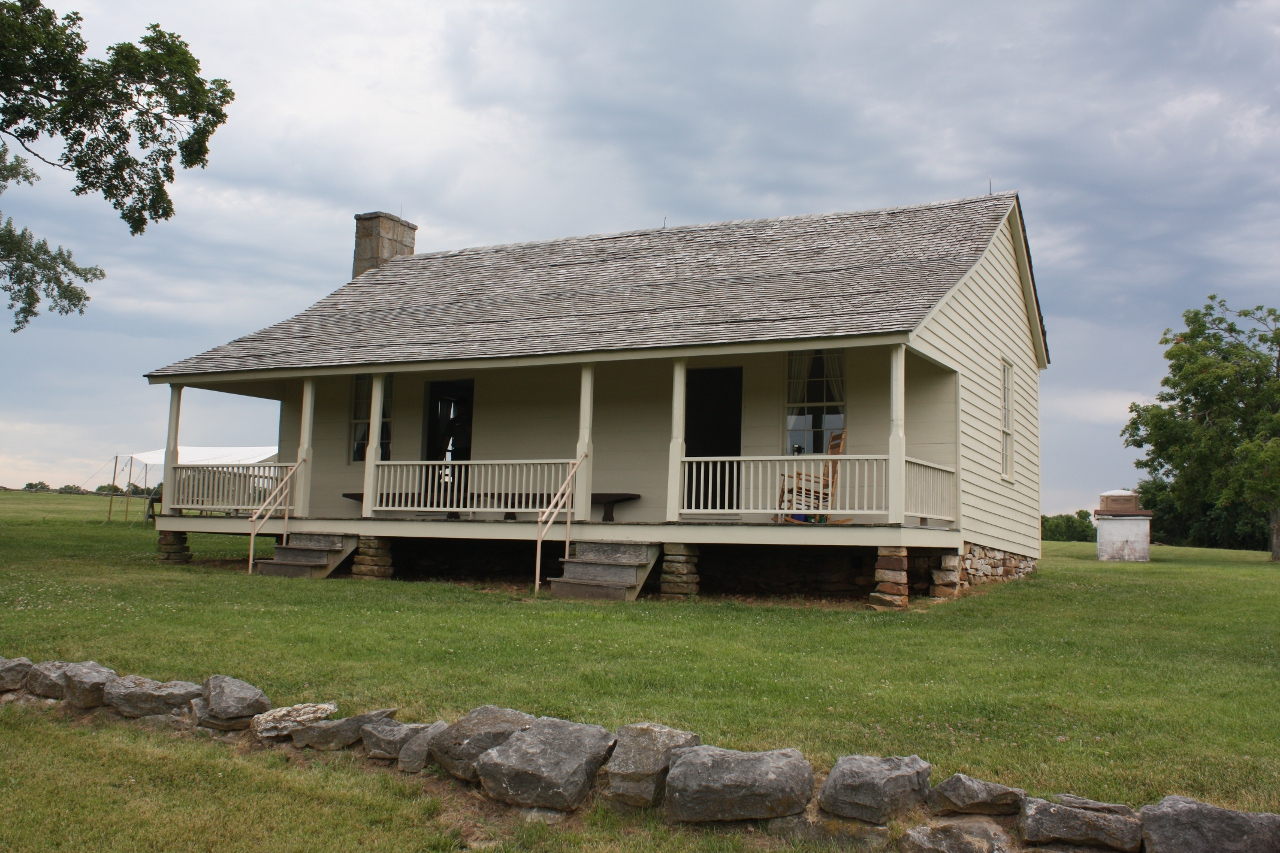
Ray House

The Ray House, which is still preserved on the battlefield, dates to before the Civil War, and was used as a field hospital following the battle. General Lyon's body was brought to the Ray House by Confederate soldiers after the Union army retreated from the field. The house is open for tours during limited hours over the summer. The tour loop also includes a stop at Bloody Hill, the site of heavy fighting during the battle, as well as the site of Lyon's death. The site of Lyon's death is marked with a monument, which was dedicated in 1928. Several cannons are also on display at Bloody Hill.

The battlefield also includes several features besides those on the tour road. One of these is the John K. and Ruth Hulston Civil War Research Library, which was founded in 1985. The library contains over 12,000 books about the Civil War, with an emphasis on the Trans-Mississippi Theater. The library also has digital access to Civil War genealogical information and some regimental histories. Also on the battlefield site is the Wilson's Creek Civil War Museum (formerly known as the General Sweeny Museum), which contains artifacts and exhibits relating to the Trans-Mississippi Theater of the American Civil War.

== Newtonia ==
The Mathew H. Ritchey House and 25 acres of battlefields of the First Battle of Newtonia and Second Battle of Newtonia including the Old Newtonia Cemetery in Newtonia, Missouri, about 45 miles away, were added to Wilson's Creek National Battlefield in 2022 by the Consolidated Appropriations Act, 2023, despite National Park Service opposition due to the lack of connection, need for protection, or enhancement of public enjoyment.
