= Moniteau Creek =

Moniteau Creek may refer to:

- Moniteau Creek (north central Missouri), a tributary of the Missouri River in Missouri
- Moniteau Creek (south central Missouri), a tributary of the Missouri River in Missouri
