= Mathew H. Ritchey House =

Historic home in Missouri

- U.S. National Register of Historic Places
- U.S. Historic district – Contributing property
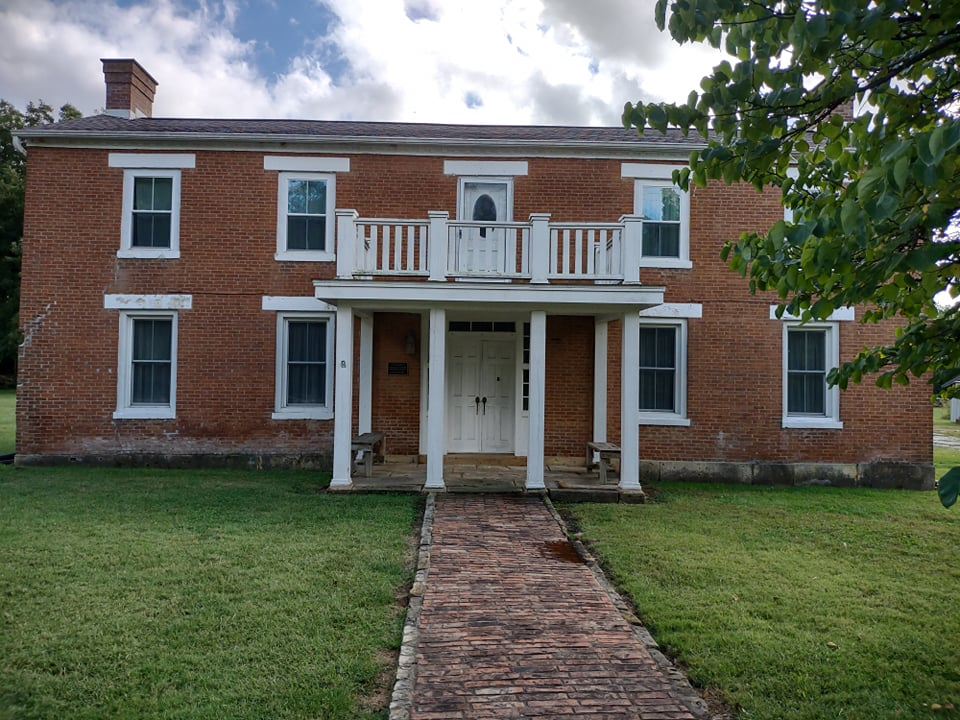
- Mathew H. Ritchey House

- Location within Missouri Location within the United States
- Location: Mill St., Newtonia, Missouri
- Coordinates: 36°52′39″N 94°10′58″W
- Area: 4.5 acres (1.8 ha)
- Built: 1840
- Built by: Mathew H. Ritchey
- NRHP reference No.: 78003399
- Added to NRHP: December 5, 1978

Mathew H. Ritchey House, also known as Mansion House and Belle Starr House, is a historic home located in Newtonia, Newton County, Missouri. It was built about 1840, and is a two-story, brick dwelling with a two-story rear wing built using slave labor. The house rests on a sandstone block foundation and has a side-gabled roof. It features a one-story front portico and interior end chimneys. Also on the property is the contributing Ritchey family cemetery, outbuildings, and a well. During the American Civil War, the site saw fighting during both the First and Second Battles of Newtonia, which required its use as a hospital after the battles. It was listed on the National Register of Historic Places in 1978 and is a contributing property in the First Battle of Newtonia Historic District. The building was damaged by a tornado in 2008.

== History ==
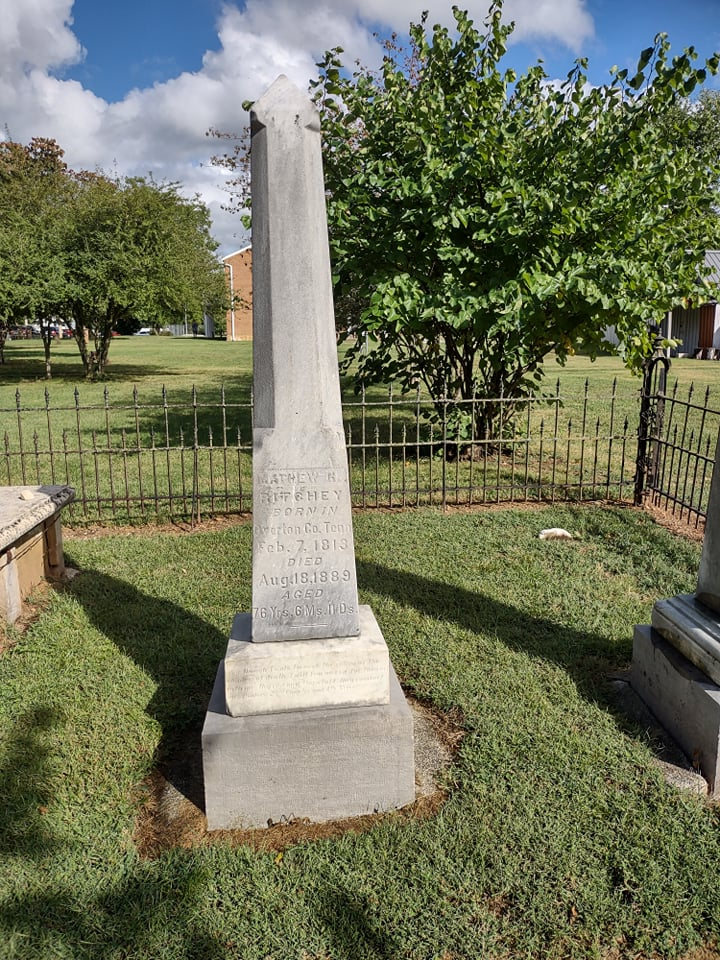
Mathew H. Ritchey's gravesite, near the house

Mathew H. Ritchey, the original builder of the house, is credited with the founding of Newtonia, Missouri. Ritchey owned slaves, but was also described as a "staunch Union man." The house, constructed in 1840 and located on Mill Street in Newtonia, was built using slave labor. The home has been described as "truly a mansion for those frontier times." In 1862, the First Battle of Newtonia was fought in the area, with some of the fighting taking place around the area of the house itself. The house saw use as a hospital after the battle, resulting in the floors becoming bloodstained. These bloodstains are believed to be the reason the woodwork in one of the home's rooms was later painted black. Additionally, reports from the time of the battle suggest that the house was damaged by cannon and small arms fire during the fighting. In 1864, as Confederate troops commanded by Sterling Price were retreating southward after a failed invasion of Missouri, the Second Battle of Newtonia was fought in the area, with the Ritchey farm again being the site of some of the action. While the First Battle of Newtonia had resulted in a Confederate victory, the Second Battle of Newtonia was a victory for the Union army. Female outlaw Belle Starr is claimed to have been briefly captured and held at the Ritchey House by Union soldiers in 1862, the story has Starr escaping from the soldiers and reaching the safety of the town of Carthage. The house also survived a fire which took place in Newtonia in 1868.

The house has undergone several changes since the 1860s and remained in the Ritchey family until 1948. The upper story, accessed from a staircase in the kitchen, was added in the 1880s. Some of the house's woodwork was removed during the 1940s to be burned for heat. The most substantial changes to the structure occurred after 1961. The shingles on the roof were replaced and new electrical and plumbing systems were added. Some of the wallpaper in the house was replaced, and the floor of the east first-story parlor was replaced as a result of termite damage. An opening in the second floor of the center hall was added, creating an access to the attic. In 1963, part of the extension was remodeled, replacing a bedroom with a hallway and bathroom. Some of the ceilings and flooring were replaced in that same year, and a portion of the exterior wall was stabilized. The building was severely damaged by a tornado in 2008, with the chimneys, the roof, and portions of the exterior walls suffering damage. After repairs from the tornado, the house was again determined to be in need of repair in 2018 due to old age and water leaks.

== Architecture ==
The house is L-shaped and has two stories. The main portion of the house's floor approximately 50 feet (15 m) by 20 feet (6.1 m), and about 2,000 square feet (190 m^{2}) of living space is in the structure. Sandstone forms the house's foundation and the walls are made of layers of brick. The inner bricks were produced through sun-drying, while the outer bricks were produced in a kiln. Six openings for windows are found on each story of the house, and the windows are decorated with lintels. Entrances are found on both the north and south sides of the first floor. Both entrances contain pine doors, and screen doors are also present at the north entrance. The north entrance is decorated with a lintel, while a transom is above the south entrance. The door present at the south entrance was originally part of the Newton County Jail.

The north entrance is sheltered by a portico (added in the 1950s), which in turn is supported by four columns and two pilasters. On top of the portico is a small balcony, which is accessed by a second-story door. The house is roofed with a gable roof, which is covered with asphalt shingles. Chimneys are present on the exterior of the east and west sides of the house, these chimneys are aligned with the center of the roof.

A main wing and an extension towards the east compose the main portion of the house. Two rooms and a central hallway are found on the first story of the northern portion of the main wing of the house. These rooms have wood floors and the walls are decorated with plaster and wainscot; the hall has wallpaper. The east fireplace has a stone hearth original to the house, as well as a mantel that is not original. A bookcase is located on either side of the fireplace, although only one of them is original. The west fireplace has a wooden mantel that is original to the home. The ceilings of the first story rooms are made of lath and plaster; a staircase in the hall provides access to the second story.

The floor plan of the second story of the main wing is similar to that of the first story. Two rooms used as bedrooms are present on either end, with a hall in between. Both of the rooms and the hallway are wallpapered. The floors are also made of wood. Fireplaces similar to those on the first story and also present on the second story. The woodwork in the east bedroom has been painted black.

The southern portion of the main wing contains a dining room that has been converted to a kitchen. The kitchen is floored with wood covered with carpet, and a fireplace is also present. A stairway leads to a bedroom on the second story. The lower portion of walls in this bedroom are covered with wainscot; three of the walls have wallpaper above the wainscot, but the north wall has painted plaster in place of the wallpaper. There is no fireplace in this room and the floor is wooden. The floor of this bedroom is set slightly lower than that of the bedrooms on the north portion of the wing. The east extension contains a hall and a bathroom, the floor surface is made of linoleum.

== National Register of Historic Places ==
The house was added to the National Register of Historic Places (NRHP) in 1978. In addition to the house itself, the site contains a well, some outbuildings which were constructed later than the house, and two cemeteries: one for the Ritchey family and another for the slaves owned by the Ritchey family. The house is privately owned, and changes to the structure, including the addition of a porch, have occurred since the NRHP listing.

In 2004, the First Battle of Newtonia Historic District was also added to the NRHP. The district contains parts of the First Battle of Newtonia battlefield, as well as other historic features in the area, including the barnyard associated with the Ritchey House at the time of the battle. While the Ritchey House is located within the First Battle of Newtonia Historic District and is a contributing property to the district, it retains its separate listing on the NRHP.

The Ritchey House and 25 acres of the battlefields including the Old Newtonia Cemetery were added to Wilson's Creek National Battlefield in 2022 by the Consolidated Appropriations Act, 2023, despite National Park Service opposition due to the lack of connection, need for protection, or enhancement of public enjoyment.
