= First Battle of Newtonia Historic District =

Historic district in Missouri, United States

- U.S. National Register of Historic Places
- U.S. Historic district
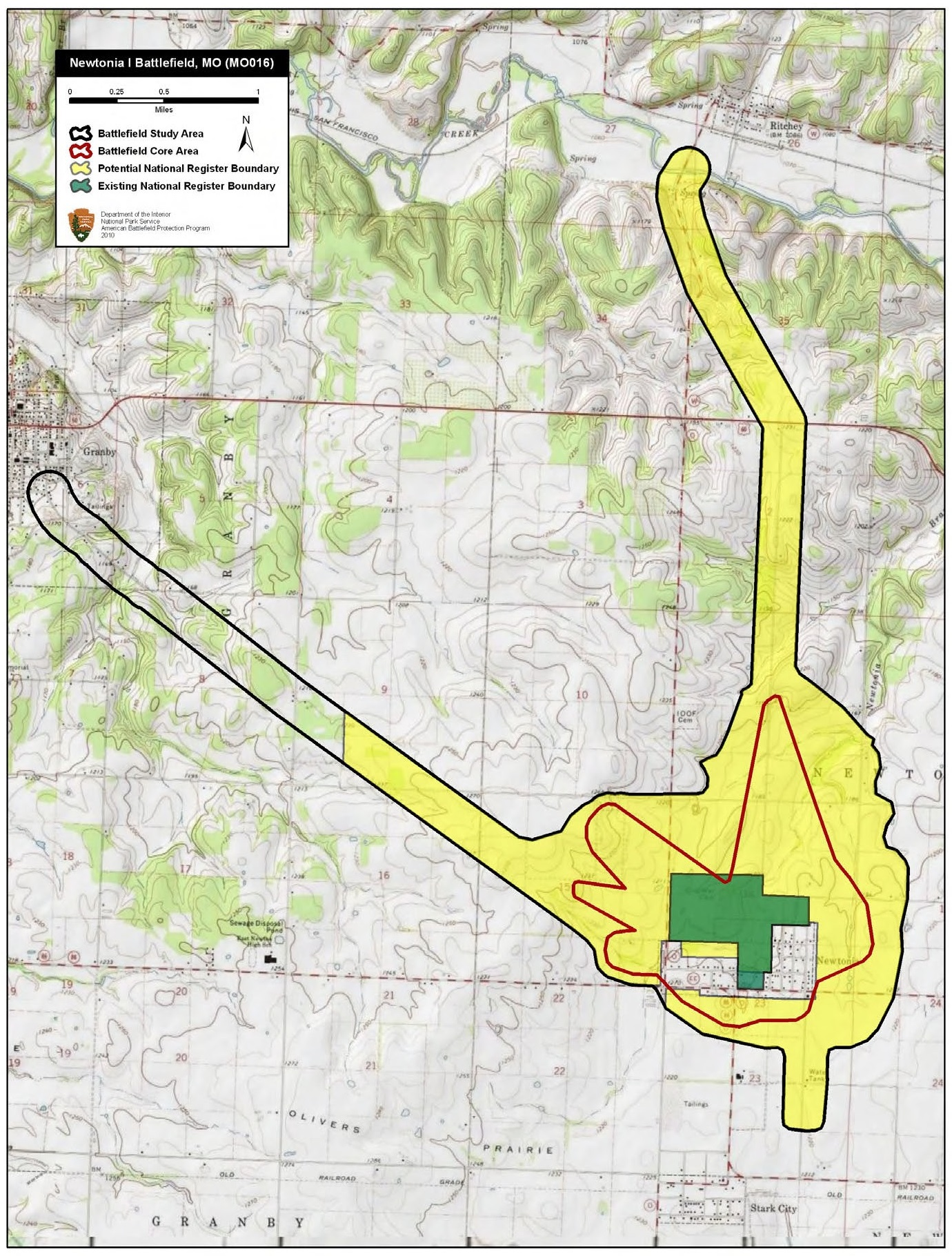
- Newtonia I Battlefield

- Location within Missouri Location within the United States
- Nearest city: Newtonia, Missouri
- Coordinates: 36°53′06″N 94°11′12″W
- Area: 152.3 acres (61.6 ha)
- NRHP reference No.: 04000697
- Added to NRHP: December 23, 2004

The First Battle of Newtonia Historic District, near Newtonia, Missouri, is a National Register of Historic Places (NRHP) site that preserves the location of the First Battle of Newtonia, an 1862 battle during the American Civil War. The battle saw Confederate troops under Colonels Douglas H. Cooper and Joseph O. Shelby defeat a Union force commanded by Brigadier General Frederick Salomon. The historic district contains some Civil War-period structures, as well as the Mathew H. Ritchey House, which is listed separately on the NRHP.

== Battle ==
In September 1862, a Union column commanded by Brigadier General James G. Blunt advanced south into southwestern Missouri. The town of Newtonia was occupied by Confederate troops composed of Confederate-sympathizing Native Americans commanded by Colonel Douglas H. Cooper and cavalry commanded by Colonel Joseph O. Shelby. Cooper had seniority over Shelby, giving him overall command of the Confederate force. Blunt's advance guard, commanded by Brigadier General Frederick Salomon, learned of the Confederate presence of Newtonia.

A Union scouting force skirmished with some of Shelby's cavalry near Granby on September 29. The next day, Salomon's main force moved towards Newtonia, encountering the main Confederate force. The battle opened with an artillery duel, which continued until the Confederate artillery began to run low on ammunition. Salomon then ordered the 9th Wisconsin Infantry around the flank of the Confederate front line. The Confederate front line gave way, but a counterattack by some of Shelby's cavalry stopped the Union advance. A combined charge by Shelby's brigade and Cooper's Native Americans broke a secondary line the Union forces had formed after their initial repulse. The Union forces retreated over ten miles to Sarcoxie. The Confederates suffered an estimated 78 casualties during the fighting, while Union casualties are estimated at 245. Despite winning the battle, the Confederate position was still not secure, as Salomon's force had only been the advance guard of a much larger Union army, leading the Confederates to decide to retreat from Missouri.

== Historic district ==
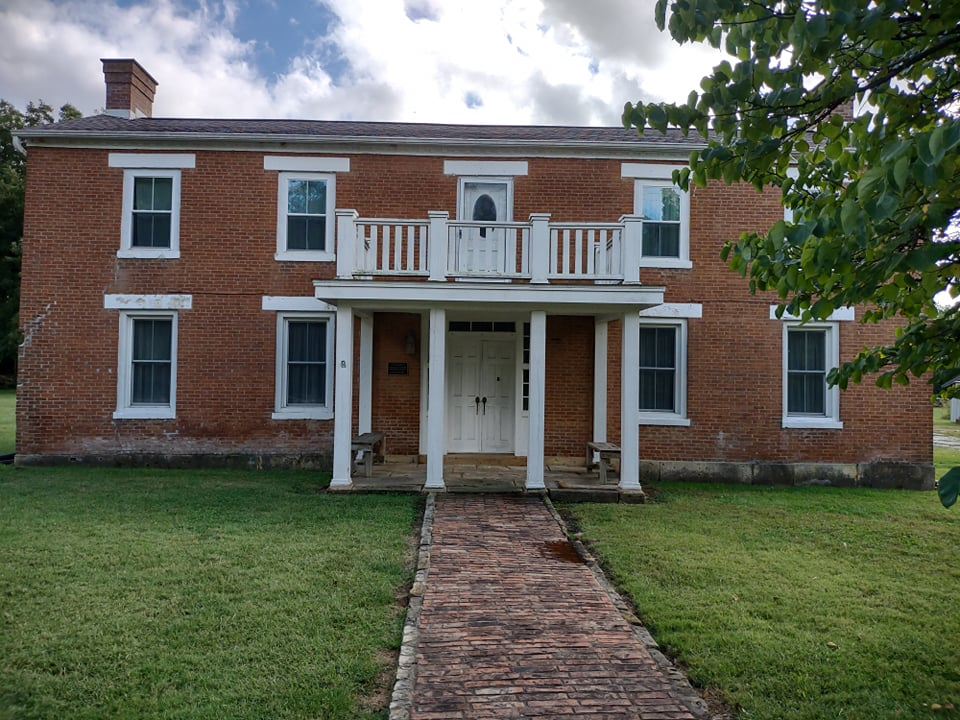
The Mathew H. Ritchey House

The First Battle of Newtonia Historic District was created in 2004 to preserve the site of the battle and is listed on the National Register of Historic Places. The central areas of the site are five contributing resources, as well as the Mathew H. Ritchey House, which is listed separately on the National Register of Historic Places. The five contributing resources are the battlefield itself, a stream named Newtonia branch, the Newtonia road, a barnyard associated with the Ritchey House, and a cemetery from the American Civil War period. The district covers 152.3 acres (61.6 ha). While most of the buildings on the battlefield postdate the battle and several stone walls present during the fighting have since been removed, the nature of the battlefield has undergone no major changes since 1862. Besides the five contributing resources, 29 post-battle structures are contained within the historic district. These structures are mostly residential buildings and mobile homes dating to the 20th century.

The cemetery within the district contains more than 600 burials, dating back to at least 1858. Nine of the burials can be directly connected to the American Civil War. While the Ritchey barn was destroyed in the late 1800s, the site of the barnyard is preserved within the historic district. Archaeology has confirmed that fighting took place in the barnyard area. While no longer extant, several fences on the barnyard site were used as makeshift breastworks during the battle. A portion of Newtonia Branch, a historic stream, is preserved within the district, as is a stretch of roadway known historically as the Neosho Road (now named Mill Street). Additionally, the Mathew H. Ritchey House, a home built in the 1840s by the founder of Newtonia, is within the district. The Ritchey House, as well as an associated family cemetery, were listed on the National Register of Historic Places separately in 1978.

A special resource study conducted by the National Park Service in 2013 determined that the First Battle of Newtonia Historic District did not meet the criteria for becoming a unit of the National Park Service as the historical and cultural features of the site were deemed too similar to those preserved at already-existing National Park Service units. The Ritchey House and 25 acres of the battlefields including the Old Newtonia Cemetery were recommended to potentially be added to Wilson's Creek National Battlefield in 2022 by the Consolidated Appropriations Act, 2023, despite National Park Service opposition due to the lack of connection, need for protection, or enhancement of public enjoyment.

== Sources ==
- Kennedy, Frances H. (1998). The Civil War Battlefield Guide (Second ed.). Boston/New York: Houghton Mifflin. ISBN 978-0-395-74012-5.
- O'Flaherty, Daniel (1954). General Jo Shelby: Undefeated Rebel. Chapel Hill, North Carolina: University of North Carolina Press. ISBN 0-8078-4878-6.
