= Marmaduke's Expeditions into Missouri =

Marmaduke's First Missouri Expedition
- Part of Operations in North Arkansas and Missouri (1863)
Date	December 31, 1862 – January 25, 1863
Location	Southwest and Central Missouri
Result	Union tactical victory

Belligerents
(United States) Union	(Confederate States of America) Confederacy

Commanders and leaders
Egbert B. Brown; Samuel Merrill	John S. Marmaduke; Joseph C. Porter

Strength
~2,500 regulars & militia	~2,300 cavalry

Casualties and losses
259 total	~280 total

Marmaduke's Missouri Expeditions were a pair of Cavalry incursions conducted by the Confederate States Army into the Union-held state of Missouri during the American Civil War. Executed in early 1863 and led by Brigadier General John S. Marmaduke, these raids were designed to break the tactical gridlock in northern Arkansas by disrupting Union army supply networks, forcing the diversion of Federal reinforcements away from the pivotal Vicksburg campaign, and gathering necessary provisions and recruits.

While both the first raid in January and the second in April successfully alarmed regional Union commanders and restricted Federal troop movements, they failed to permanently alter the strategic balance in the Trans-Mississippi theater.

== First Expedition (January 1863) ==
On December 31, 1862, Marmaduke moved north from Lewisville, Arkansas, utilizing a multi-pronged assault strategy. He personally led the primary column, while a secondary brigade under Colonel Joseph C. Porter struck out from Pocahontas, Arkansas, intending to rendezvous deeper in the state.

=== Battle of Springfield II ===
Upon discovering that the critical federal depot at Springfield, Missouri was vulnerable, Marmaduke concentrated his immediate forces and attacked on January 8, 1863. However, the Union garrison—composed of mixed regular units and the Enrolled Missouri Militia under Brigadier General Egbert B. Brown—had rapidly reinforced urban stockades. Following severe street fighting, the Union lines held, forcing Marmaduke to withdraw eastward after setting fire to valuable military warehouses.

=== Battle of Hartville ===
Marmaduke redirected his columns toward their original target of Hartville, Missouri, where Porter’s detachment had successfully captured a local militia group. On January 11, the combined Confederate force intercepted an approaching Union relief column led by Colonel Samuel Merrill. A brutal four-hour battle followed; while Marmaduke secured a tactical victory by driving Merrill's regiments back toward Houston, Missouri, heavy Confederate officer casualties and bitter winter conditions rendered further offensive movement impossible, forcing a retreat back to Arkansas.

== Second Expedition (April-May 1863) ==
Marmaduke's Second Missouri Expedition
- Part of Operations in North Arkansas and Missouri (1863)
Date	April 18 – May 2, 1863
Location	Southeast Missouri
Result	Union tactical victory

Belligerents
(United States) Union	(Confederate States of America) Confederacy

Commanders and leaders
John McNeil	John S. Marmaduke; Jo Shelby; George Carter

Strength
~4,000 regulars & garrison	~5,000 cavalry

Casualties and losses
~120 total	~320 total

Hoping to capitalize on lingering Union instability, Marmaduke organized a larger force of roughly 5,000 cavalrymen, splitting them into columns led by Colonels Joseph O. Shelby and George Carter, and advanced into southeastern Missouri on April 18, 1863.

=== Battle of Cape Girardeau ===
Marmaduke's operational goal was to encircle and crush a Union brigade under Brigadier General John McNeil at Bloomfield. Recognizing the danger, McNeil conducted a fighting retreat to the heavily fortified port town of Cape Girardeau, Missouri, anchoring his lines within permanent artillery forts on the Mississippi River, On April 26, a sharp demonstration by Shelby's brigade rapidly escalated into a full-scale assault against the fortifications. The massed Union artillery successfully shattered the Confederate advance, forcing Marmaduke to abandon his attempt on the port.

=== Battle of Chalk Bluff ===
Pursued relentlessly by McNeil’s cavalry during their retreat, the Confederates made a final stand from April 30 to May 2 along the St. Francis River. In a desperate rearguard action at Battle of Chalk Bluff, Marmaduke’s engineers managed to throw together a floating footbridge under fire. The maneuver allowed the surviving division to slip back across the state line into Arkansas before the bridge was destroyed, ending the campaign.

== Strategic aftermath ==
Tactically, the raids cost the Confederacy heavily in irreplaceable mounts, ammunition, and leadership. Culturally, the stress of the failed second expedition sparked bitter internal political rivalries among the officer corps, culminating in an infamous September 1863 duel where Marmaduke shot and killed Confederate Brigadier General Lucius M. Walker. Strategically, however, the operations achieved their short-term goal by freezing thousands of Union garrison troops inside Missouri, preventing them from reinforcing the critical federal armies operating against Vicksburg, Mississippi. Marmaduke would later build extensively on his knowledge of these corridors during his role as a senior division commander in Price's Missouri Expedition in 1864.

== See also ==
- List of American Civil War battles
- Missouri in the American Civil War
- Arkansas in the American Civil War
- Guerrilla warfare in the American Civil War
