= Newtonia, Missouri =

- Village
- Location of Newtonia, Missouri
- Coordinates: 36°52′46″N 94°11′01″W
- Country: United States
- State: Missouri
- County: Newton

Area
  - Total: 0.33 sq mi (0.85 km^{2})
  - Land: 0.33 sq mi (0.85 km^{2})
  - Water: 0 sq mi (0.00 km^{2})
- Elevation: 1,191 ft (363 m)

Population (2024)
  - Total: 213
  - Estimate: 213
  - Density: 624.8/sq mi (241.24/km^{2})
- Time zone: UTC-6 (Central (CST))
  - Summer (DST): UTC-5 (CDT)
- ZIP Code: 64853
- Area code: 417
- FIPS code: 29-52292
- GNIS feature ID: 2396814

Newtonia is a village in Newton County, Missouri, United States. The population was 199 at the 2010 census. It is part of the Joplin, Missouri Metropolitan Statistical Area. Newtonia was the site of the Battles of Newtonia during the American Civil War. The village contains some Antebellum houses, such as the Mathew H. Ritchey House, as well as a cemetery for Civil War dead. It is a farming community and is immediately adjacent to Stark City, Missouri.

== History ==
Newtonia was laid out in 1857, taking its name from Newton County. A post office called Newtonia was established in 1858, and remained in operation until 1973.

The First Battle of Newtonia Historic District, Mathew H. Ritchey House, and Second Battle of Newtonia Site are listed on the National Register of Historic Places.

In 2008, a tornado struck the village, damaging many homes (including the Mathew H. Ritchey House.

== Geography ==
Newtonia is located on Missouri Route 86, approximately nine miles east of Neosho. Stark City lies one mile south along Route 86. Granby is approximately 4.5 miles to the northwest on U.S. Route 60.

According to the United States Census Bureau, the village has a total area of 0.33 square miles (0.85 km^{2}), all land.

== Demographics ==
Historical population
Census	Pop.	Note	%±
1870	463		—
1880	436		−5.8%
1890	400		−8.3%
1900	355		−11.2%
1910	203		−42.8%
1920	200		−1.5%
1930	203		1.5%
1940	195		−3.9%
1950	190		−2.6%
1960	153		−19.5%
1970	208		35.9%
1980	224		7.7%
1990	204		−8.9%
2000	231		13.2%
2010	199		−13.9%
2020	204		2.5%
U.S. Decennial Census

=== 2010 census ===
As of the census of 2010, there were 199 people, 74 households, and 55 families living in the village. The population density was 603.0 inhabitants per square mile (232.8/km^{2}). There were 84 housing units at an average density of 254.5 per square mile (98.3/km^{2}). The racial makeup of the village was 95.0% White, 0.5% African American, 0.5% Native American, 2.5% Asian, and 1.5% from two or more races. Hispanic or Latino of any race were 1.5% of the population.

There were 74 households, of which 29.7% had children under the age of 18 living with them, 59.5% were married couples living together, 10.8% had a female householder with no husband present, 4.1% had a male householder with no wife present, and 25.7% were non-families. 23.0% of all households were made up of individuals, and 16.3% had someone living alone who was 65 years of age or older. The average household size was 2.69 and the average family size was 3.18.

The median age in the village was 41.3 years. 26.6% of residents were under the age of 18; 10.4% were between the ages of 18 and 24; 16.5% were from 25 to 44; 27% were from 45 to 64; and 19.1% were 65 years of age or older. The gender makeup of the village was 50.8% male and 49.2% female.

=== 2000 census ===
As of the census of 2000, there were 231 people, 89 households, and 67 families living in the town. The population density was 702.0 inhabitants per square mile (271.0/km^{2}). There were 92 housing units at an average density of 279.6 per square mile (108.0/km^{2}). The racial makeup of the town was 92.64% White, 3.90% Native American, 1.73% from other races, and 1.73% from two or more races. Hispanic or Latino of any race were 2.16% of the population.

There were 89 households, out of which 32.6% had children under the age of 18 living with them, 61.8% were married couples living together, 9.0% had a female householder with no husband present, and 24.7% were non-families. 22.5% of all households were made up of individuals, and 12.4% had someone living alone who was 65 years of age or older. The average household size was 2.60 and the average family size was 3.07.

In the town the population was spread out, with 29.0% under the age of 18, 7.8% from 18 to 24, 25.1% from 25 to 44, 20.8% from 45 to 64, and 17.3% who were 65 years of age or older. The median age was 39 years. For every 100 females, there were 92.5 males. For every 100 females age 18 and over, there were 88.5 males.

The median income for a household in the town was $34,375, and the median income for a family was $35,625. Males had a median income of $26,000 versus $26,000 for females. The per capita income for the town was $13,088. About 12.7% of families and 15.3% of the population were below the poverty line, including 21.4% of those under the age of eighteen and 16.1% of those 65 or over.
