= Brookline, Missouri =

Former village in Greene County, Missouri, United States, that is now part of Republic

- Former Village
- Location of Brookline, Missouri
- Coordinates: 37°10′45″N 93°25′2″W
- Country: United States
- State: Missouri
- County: Greene
- Incorporated: 1971

Area
  - Total: 4.0 sq mi (10.4 km^{2})
  - Land: 4.0 sq mi (10.4 km^{2})
  - Water: 0 sq mi (0.0 km^{2})
- Elevation: 1,283 ft (391 m)

Population (2000)
  - Total: 326
  - Density: 81/sq mi (31.4/km^{2})
- Time zone: UTC-6 (Central (CST))
  - Summer (DST): UTC-5 (CDT)
- ZIP code: 65619
- Area code: 417
- FIPS code: 29-08722
- GNIS feature ID: 0735531

Brookline is a former village in Greene County, Missouri, United States. The population was 326 at the 2000 census.

== History ==
Brookline was laid out in 1871 when the railroad was extended to that point. A post office called Brookline Station was established in 1871. The community took its name from Brookline, Massachusetts.

=== Consolidation ===
In 2005, Brookline consolidated with the city of Republic after a vote of the residents of both communities approved the consolidation. The individual names of Brookline and Republic were to be used for each area, but the town would be governed under the city of Republic. Since this time, the city limit signs of Brookline have been removed and replaced with Republic's. Small markers on the main road through Brookline label the main part of the town, though these are ones used by Missouri for unincorporated communities. Brookline continues to retain its post office and ZIP code and is the official address name for the former community, which is as the intergovernmental agreement between the City of Republic and the Village of Brookline stated:

“Name of Consolidated Municipality – The name of the consolidated municipality shall be “City of Republic.” To help preserve the identity of the Village, the City will place signs with text “Village of Brookline” at the current corporate limits of the Village. Placement of signage is subject to State sign regulations when placed in State right-of-way. The City of Republic will work with the United States Postal Service to help preserve the history and operation of the Brookline Station Post Office.”

== Demographics ==
Historical population
Census	Pop.	Note	%±
1880	143		—
1970	247		—
1980	211		−14.6%
1990	283		34.1%
2000	326		15.2%
U.S. Decennial Census

As of the census of 2000, there were 326 people, 139 households, and 97 families residing in the village. The population density was 31.4 people/km^{2} (81 people/mi^{2}). There were 155 housing units at an average density of 14.9 units/km^{2} (39 units/mi^{2}). The racial makeup of the village was 99.08% White, 0.31% Native American, and 0.61% from two or more races.

There were 139 households, out of which 25.9% had children under the age of 18 living with them, 56.1% were married couples living together, 9.4% had a female householder with no husband present, and 29.5% were non-families. 25.2% of all households were made up of individuals, and 8.6% had someone living alone who was 65 years of age or older. The average household size was 2.35 and the average family size was 2.76.

In the village, the population was spread out, with 21.5% under the age of 18, 5.8% from 18 to 24, 30.1% from 25 to 44, 28.5% from 45 to 64, and 14.1% who were 65 years of age or older. The median age was 41 years. For every 100 females, there were 92.9 males. For every 100 females age 18 and over, there were 91.0 males.

The median income for a household in the village was $29,750, and the median income for a family was $41,750. Males had a median income of $34,063 versus $25,313 for females. The per capita income for the village was $17,130. About 9.5% of families and 13.2% of the population were below the poverty line, including 23.8% of those under age 18 and 8.3% of those age 65 or over.

== See also ==
- List of cities in Missouri
- Young Brothers Massacre
- Springfield, Missouri Metropolitan Area
