= Bibliography of American Civil War battles and campaigns =

The American Civil War bibliography comprises books that deal in large part with the American Civil War. There are over 60,000 books on the war, with more appearing each month. There is no complete bibliography to the war; the largest guide to books is more than 50 years old and lists over 6,000 titles.

Note: This article forms part of Bibliography of the American Civil War

== Battles: surveys, strategies, tactics ==
- Beringer, Richard E., Herman Hattaway, Archer Jones, and William N. Still Jr. Why the South Lost the Civil War. Athens: University of Georgia Press, 1986. ISBN 978-0-8203-0815-9.
- Blair, Jayne E. The Essential Civil War: A Handbook to the Battles, Armies, Navies And Commanders. Jefferson, North Carolina: McFarland & Company, Inc., 2006. ISBN 978-0-7864-2472-6.
- Boritt, Gabor S., ed. Why the Confederacy Lost. New York: Oxford University Press, 1992. ISBN 0-19-507405-X.
- Catton, Bruce, James M. McPherson, and Noah Andre Trudeau. The American Heritage New History of the Civil War. New York: Viking, 1996. ISBN 978-0-670-86804-9.
- Catton, Bruce. The American Heritage Picture History of the Civil War. 1982 ed. New York: American Heritage Publishing, 1960. ISBN 978-0-517-38556-2.
- Catton, Bruce. The Civil War. New York: American Heritage Publishing, 1960. ISBN 978-0-8281-0305-3.
- Catton, Bruce. The Centennial History of the Civil War. Vol. 1, The Coming Fury. Garden City, NY: Doubleday, 1961. ISBN 978-0-641-68525-5.
- Catton, Bruce. The Centennial History of the Civil War. Vol. 2, Terrible Swift Sword. Garden City, NY: Doubleday, 1963. ISBN 978-0-385-02614-7.
- Catton, Bruce. The Centennial History of the Civil War. Vol. 3, Never Call Retreat. Garden City, NY: Doubleday, 1965. ISBN 978-0-671-46990-0.
- Chaitin, Peter M. The Coastal War: Chesapeake Bay to Rio Grande. Alexandria, Virginia: Time–Life Books, 1984. ISBN 0-8094-4732-0.
- Connelly, Thomas L., and Archer Jones. The Politics of Command: Factions and Ideas In Confederate Strategy. Baton Rouge: Louisiana State University Press, 1998. Louisiana Paperback Edition published 1998. ISBN 978-0-8071-2349-2. First published Baton Rouge: Louisiana State University Press, 1973.
- Davis, William C. Crucible of Command: Ulysses S. Grant and Robert E. Lee – The War They Fought, The Peace They Forged. Boston: Da Capo Press, A Member of Perseus Books Group, 2014. ISBN 978-0-306-82245-2.
- Eicher, David J. The Longest Night: A Military History of the Civil War. New York: Simon & Schuster, 2001. ISBN 978-0-684-84944-7.
- Field, Ron. Confederate Cavalryman versus Union Cavalryman: Eastern Theater 1861–65. Oxford, United Kingdom: Osprey Publishing, 2015. ISBN 978-1-4728-0731-1.
- Field, Ron. Union Infantryman versus Confederate Infantryman: Eastern Theater 1861–65. Oxford, United Kingdom: Osprey Publishing, 2013. ISBN 978-1-78096-927-5.
- Freeman, Douglas S. Lee's Lieutenants: A Study in Command. Manassas to Malvern Hill. Vol. 1 of 3 vols. New York: Scribner, 1942. ISBN 978-0-684-10175-0.
- Freeman, Douglas S. Lee's Lieutenants: A Study in Command. Cedar Mountain to Chancellorsville. Vol. 2 of 3 vols. New York: Scribner, 1943. ISBN 978-0-684-10176-7.
- Freeman, Douglas S. Lee's Lieutenants: A Study in Command. Gettysburg to Appomattox. Vol. 3 of 3 vols. New York: Scribner, 1944. ISBN 978-0-684-10177-4.
- Gallagher, Gary W., Stephen D. Engle, Robert K. Krick and Joseph T. Glatthaar, foreword by James M. McPherson. The American Civil War: This Might Scourge of War. Westminster, MD: Osprey Publishing Limited, 2003. ISBN 978-1-84176-736-9.
- Gallagher, Gary W. and Joan Waugh. The American War: A History of the Civil War Era. Second edition. State College, PA: Flip Learning, 2019. ISBN 978-1-7327075-5-9.
- Goss, Thomas J. The War within the Union High Command: Politics and Generalship during the Civil War. Lawrence, Kansas: University Press of Kansas, 2003. ISBN 978-0-7006-1263-5.
- Griess, Thomas E. The American Civil War. The West Point Military History Series. Garden City Park, NY: Square One Publishers, 2002. ISBN 978-0-7570-0156-7.
- Guelzo, Allen C. Fateful Lightning: A New History of the Civil War & Reconstruction. New York: Oxford University Press, 2012. ISBN 978-0-19-984328-2.
- Hagan, Neil and Stephen Hyslop. Atlas of the Civil War: A Comprehensive Guide to the Tactics and Terrain of Battle. National Geographic, 2009. ISBN 978-1-4262-0347-3.
- Hansen, Harry. The Civil War: A History. New York: Bonanza Books, 1961. OCLC 500488542.
- Hattaway, Herman, and Archer Jones. How the North Won: A Military History of the Civil War. Urbana: University of Illinois Press, 1983. ISBN 978-0-252-00918-1.
- Kagan, Neil, and Stephen G. Hyslop. Eyewitness to the Civil War: The Complete History From Secession to Reconstruction. Washington D.C.: National Geographic, 2006. ISBN 978-07922-5280-1.
- Keegan, John, The American Civil War: A Military History. New York: Alfred A. Knopf, 2009. ISBN 978-0-307-26343-8.
- McPherson, James M. Battle Cry of Freedom: The Civil War Era. Oxford History of the United States. New York: Oxford University Press, 1988. ISBN 978-0-19-503863-7.
- McPherson, James M. Ordeal By Fire: The Civil War and Reconstruction. New York: Alfred A. Knopf, 1982. ISBN 978-0-394-52469-6.
- Murray, Williamson and Wayne Wei-Siang Hsieh. A Savage War: A Military History of the Civil War. Princeton, NJ: Princeton University Press, 2016. ISBN 978-0-691-16940-8.
- Nevins, Allan. The War for the Union. Vol. 1, The Improvised War 1861 – 1862. New York: Charles Scribner's Sons, 1959. ISBN 978-0-684-10426-3.
- Nevins, Allan. The War for the Union. Vol. 2, War Becomes Revolution 1862 – 1863. New York: Charles Scribner's Sons, 1960. ISBN 978-1-56852-297-5.
- Nevins, Allan. The War for the Union. Vol. 3, The Organized War 1863 – 1864. New York: Charles Scribner's Sons, 1971. ISBN 978-0-684-10428-7.
- Nevins, Allan. The War for the Union. Vol. 4, The Organized War to Victory 1864 – 1865. New York: Charles Scribner's Sons, 1971. ISBN 978-1-56852-299-9.
- Rafuse, Ethan S. McClellan's War: The Failure of Moderation in the Struggle for the Union. Bloomington: Indiana University Press, 2005. ISBN 978-0-253-34532-5.
- Rafuse, Ethan S. Robert E. Lee and The Fall of the Confederacy, 1863-1865. Lanham, MD: Rowman & Littlefield Publishers, Inc., 2008; Paperback edition, 2009. ISBN 978-0-7425-5126-8.
- Rogers, Clifford J., Ty Seidule and Samuel J. Watson, eds. The West Point History of the Civil War. New York: Simon & Schuster, 2014. ISBN 978-1-4767-8262-1.
- Royster, Charles. Destructive War: William Tecumseh Sherman, Stonewall Jackson, and the American Civil War. New York: Alfred A. Knopf, 1992.
- Smith, Andrew F. Starving the South: How the North Won the Civil War. St. Martin's Press, 2011. ISBN 978-0-312-60181-2.
- Smithsonian Institution. The Civil War: A Visual History. New York: DK Publishing, 2011. ISBN 978-0-7566-7185-3.
- Walters, John Bennett. Merchant of Terror: General Sherman and Total War. New York: Bobbs-Merrill, 1973.
- Weigley, Russell F. A Great Civil War: A Military and Political History, 1861–1865. Bloomington and Indianapolis: Indiana University Press, 2000. ISBN 0-253-33738-0.
- Williams, Kenneth P. . Lincoln Finds a General: A Military Study of the Civil War, five volumes. 1959.
- Williams, T. Harry. Lincoln and His Generals. New York: Alfred A. Knopf, 1952. ISBN 978-0-9654382-6-1. Later edition McGraw–Hill 1967.

== Battles and campaigns: Eastern Theater ==
- Ashby, Thomas A. The Valley Campaigns. New York: Neale Publishing Co., 1914.
- Coffey, David. Sheridan's Lieutenants: Phil Sheridan, His Generals, and the Final Year of the Civil War. Rowman & Littlefield, 2005.
- Collins, Darrell. General William Averell's Salem Raid: Breaking the Knoxville Supply Line. Shippensburg, Pennsylvania: Burd Street Press, 1999.
- Collins, Darrell L. The Jones-Imboden Raid: The Confederate Attempt to Destroy the Baltimore & Ohio Railroad and Retake West Virginia. Jefferson, North Carolina: McFarland & Company, Inc., 2007. ISBN 978-0-7864-3070-3.
- Connery, William S. Civil War Northern Virginia 1861. Charleston, South Carolina: The History Press, 2011. ISBN 9781609493523.
- Connery, William S. Mosby's Raids in Civil War Northern Virginia. Charleston, SC: The History Press, 2013. ISBN 9781609498931
- Duncan, Richard R. Lee's Endangered Left: The Civil War in Western Virginia Spring of 1864. Baton Rouge, Louisiana: Louisiana State University Press, 1998.
- Freeman, Douglas S. Lee's Lieutenants: A Study in Command. 3 vols. New York: Scribner, 1946. ISBN 978-0-684-85979-8. vol 1 from 1861 to the Seven Days' Battles; Vol 2 from Cedar Mountain to Chancellorsville, August 1862-May 1863; vol 3 to end of war. See previous section for full titles.
- Hunt, Jeffrey W. Meade and Lee at Rappahannock Station: The Army of the Potomac’s First Post-Gettysburg Offensive, From Kelly’s Ford to the Rapidan, October 21 to November 20, 1863. Savas Beatie, 2021. ISBN 978-1-61121-539-7.
- Jamieson, Perry D. Spring 1865: The Closing Campaigns of the Civil War. Lincoln and London: University of Nebraska Press, 2015. ISBN 978-0-8032-2581-7.
- Lockwood. The Siege of Washington: The Untold Story of the Twelve Days That Shook the Union. New York: Oxford University Press, 2011.
- Marvel, William. The Battles for Saltville: Southwest Virginia in the Civil War. Lynchburg, Virginia: H.E. Howard, 1992.
- Meserve, Stevan F. The Civil War in Loudoun County, Virginia: A History of Hard Times. With a Chapter on Ball's Bluff by James A. Morgan, III. Charleston, SC: The History Press, 2008. ISBN 978-1-59629-378-6.
- Moss, Juanita P. Battle of Plymouth, North Carolina: The Last Confederate Victory. Willow Bend Books, 2003. ISBN 9781585498529.
- Nelson, James L. Reign of Iron: The Story of the First Battling Ironclads, the Monitor and the Merrimack. William Marrow, 2004.
- Oxford, Lee Thomas. The Civil War on Hattteras: The Chicamacomico Affair and the Capture of the U.S. Gunboat "Fanny". Charleston, SC: The History Press, 2013. ISBN 978-1-60949-898-6.
- Rafuse, Ethan S. From the Mountains to the Bay: The War in Virginia, January–May 1862. Lawrence, Kansas: University Press of Kansas, 2022. ISBN 9780700633531.
- Rankin, Thomas M. Stonewall Jackson's Romney Campaign. Lynchburg, Virginia: H. E. Howard, 1994.
- Sauers, Richard. The Burnside Expedition in North Carolina. Dayton, Ohio: Morningside House, 1996.
- Schultz, Duane. The Dahlgren Affair. New York: W.W. Norton, 1998.
- Swanberg, W. A. First Blood: The Story of Fort Sumter 1957.
- Trout, Robert J. After Gettysburg: Cavalry Operations in the Eastern Theater July 14, 1863 to December 31, 1863. Casemates Publishers, 2012. ISBN 978-0-979403-57-6.
- Wheelan, Joseph. Their Last Full Measure: The Final Days of the Civil War. Boston: Da Capo Press, a Member of the Perseus Book Group, 2015. ISBN 978-0-306-82360-2.
- Wills, Mary Alice. The Confederate Blockade of Washington, D.C., 1861–1862. Shippensburg, Pennsylvania: Burd Street Press, 1998. ISBN 1-57249-078-0.
- Wittenburg, Eric J. The Union Cavalry Comes of Age: Hartwood Church to Brandy Station 1863. Washington, D.C.: Brassey's, 2003.
- Zatarga, Michael P. The Battle of Roanoke Island: Burnside and the Fight for North Carolina. Charleston, South Carolina: The History Press, 2015. ISBN 978-1-62619-901-9.

=== Appomattox Campaign ===
- Alexander, Edward S. Dawn of Victory: Breakthrough at Petersburg, March 25-April 2, 1865. Savas Beatie, 2015. ISBN 978-1-61121-280-8.
- Bearss, Edwin C. and Chris Calkins. The Battle of Five Forks. Lynchburg, Virginia: H. E. Howard, 1985.
- Cauble, Frank P. The Surrender Proceedings, April 9, 1865, Appomattox Court House. Lynchburg, Virginia: H.E. Howard, 1987.
- Calkins, Chris M. The Appomattox Campaign: March 29 - April 9, 1865. Conshohocken, Pennsylvania: Combined Books, 1997. ISBN 978-0-938-28954-8.
- Calkins, Chris M. The Battles of Appomattox. Lynchburg, Virginia: H. E. Howard, Inc., 1987.
- Calkins, Chris M. The Final Bivouac. Lynchburg, Virginia: H. E. Howard, Inc., 1987.
- Calkins, Chris M. From Petersburg to Appomattox. Farmville Herald Pub. Co., 1983.
- Calkins, Chris M. Thirty-Six Hours Before Appomattox, April 6–7, 1865. Farmville Herald Pub. Co., 1980.
- Davis, Burke. Appomattox: Closing Struggle of the Civil War. New York: Harper & Row, 1963.
- Davis, Burke. To Appomattox: Nine April Days, 1865. New York: Eastern Acorn Press reprint, 1981. ISBN 978-0-915992-17-1. First published New York: Rinehart, 1959.
- Davis, Burke. The Long Surrender. New York: Random House, 1985. ISBN 978-0-394-52083-4.
- Dunkerly, Robert M. To the Bitter End: Appomattox, Bennett Place and the Surrenders of the Confederacy. El Dorado Hills, California: Savas Beatie, 2015. ISBN 978-1-61121-252-5.
- Jamieson, Perry D. Spring 1865: The Closing Campaigns of the Civil War. Lincoln and London: University of Nebraska Press, 2015. ISBN 978-0-8032-2581-7.
- Korn, Jerry. Pursuit to Appomattox: The Last Battles. Alexandria, Virginia: Time-Life Books, 1987. ISBN 0-8094-4788-6.
- Longacre, Edward G. The Cavalry at Appomattox: A Tactical Study of Mounted Operations During the Civil War's Climactic Campaign, March 27 – April 9, 1865. Mechanicsburg, Pennsylvania: Stackpole Books, 2003. ISBN 978-0-8117-0051-1.
- Marvel, William. Lee's Last Retreat: The Flight to Appomattox. Chapel Hill, North Carolina: University of North Carolina Press, 2002. ISBN 978-0-8078-5703-8.
- McCarthy, Michael J. Confederate Waterloo: The Battle of Five Forks, April 1, 1865, and the Controversy that Brought Down a General. Savas Beatie, 2017. ISBN 978-1-61121-309-6.
- Nine, William G. and Ronald G. Wilson. The Appomattox paroles, April 9–15, 1865. Lynchburg, Virginia: H.E. Howard, 1989.
- Rodick, Burleigh. Appomattox: The Last Campaign. New York: Philosophical Library Inc., 1965.
- Trudeau, Noah Andre. Out of the Storm: The End of the Civil War, April–June 1865. Boston, New York: Little, Brown and Company, 1994. ISBN 978-0-316-85328-6.
- Smith, Derek. Lee's Last Stand: Sailor's Creek, Virginia, 1865. Shippensburg, Pennsylvania: White Mane Books, 2002. ISBN 9781572492516.
- Varon, Elizabeth R. Appomattox: Victory, Defeat, and Freedom at the End of the Civil War. New York: Oxford University Press, 2014.
- Wheelan, Joseph. Their Last Full Measure: The Final Days of the Civil War. Boston: Da Capo Press, a Member of the Perseus Book Group, 2015. ISBN 978-0-306-82360-2.
- Winik, Jay. April 1865: The Month That Saved America. New York: HarperCollins, 2006. ISBN 978-0-06-089968-4. First published 2001.

=== Averell's Raid on the Virginia & Tennessee Railroad ===
- Lowry, Terry. Last Sleep: The Battle of Droop Mountain, November 6, 1863. Charleston, West Virginia: Pictorial Histories Publishing, 1996.
- Wittenberg, Eric J. The Battle of White Sulphur Springs: Averell Fails to Secure West Virginia. The History Press, 2011. ISBN 9781609490058.

=== Battle of Ball's Bluff ===
- Farwell, Byron. Balls Bluff: A Small Battle and Its Long Shadow. EPM Publications, 1990. ISBN 978-0-939009-36-7.
- Holien, Kim Bernard. Battle at Ball's Bluff. Orange, Virginia: Moss Publications, 1985.
- Howard, William F. The Battle of Ball's Bluff: "The Leesburg Affair," October 21, 1861. Lynchburg, Virginia: H.E. Howard, 1994.
- Morgan, III, James A. A Little Short of Boats: The Battles of Ball's Bluff & Edwards Ferry, October 21, 1861, revised and expanded edition. New York: Savas Beatie LLC, 2011. ISBN 978-1-611210-66-8.
- Patch, Joseph Dorst. The Battle of Ball's Bluff. Leesburg, Virginia: Potomac Press, 1958.

=== Battle of Big Bethel ===
- Cobb, J. Michael, Edward B. Hicks, and Wythe Holt. Battle of Big Bethel: Crucial Clash in Early Civil War Virginia. Savas Beatie, LLC, 2013. ISBN 978-1-61121-116-0.
- Quarstein, John V. Big Bethel: The First Battle. Charleston, South Carolina: The History Press, 2011. ISBN 9781609493547.

=== Bristoe Station and Mine Run Campaigns ===
- Backus, Bill and Robert Orrison. A Want of Vigilance: The Bristoe Station Campaign, October 9–19, 1863. Savas Beatie, 2015. ISBN 978-1-61121-300-3.
- Gottfried, Bradley M. The Maps of the Bristoe Station and Mine Run Campaigns: An Atlas of the Battles and Movements in the Eastern Theater after Gettysburg, Including Rappahannock Station, Kelly’s Ford, and Morton’s Ford, July 1863 – February 1864. Savas Beatie, LLC, 2013. ISBN 978-1-61121-152-8.
- Graham, Martin F. and George F. Skoch. Mine Run: A Campaign of Lost Opportunities, October 21, 1863–May 1, 1864. Lynchburg, Virginia: H.E. Howard, 1987.
- Henderson, William D. The Road to Bristoe Station: Campaigning with Lee and Meade, August 1–October 20, 1863. Lynchburg, Virginia: H.E. Howard, 1987.
- Hunt, Jeffrey W. Meade and Lee at Bristoe Station: The Problems of Command and Strategy after Gettysburg, from Brandy Station to the Buckland Races, August 1 to October 31, 1863. Savas Beatie, 2019. ISBN 978-1-61121-539-7.
- Mackowski, Chris. The Great Battle Never Fought: The Mine Run Campaign, November 26-December 2, 1863. El Dorado Hills, CA: Savas Beatie, LLC, 2014. ISBN 978-1-61121-407-9.
- Tighe, Adrian G. The Bristoe Campaign: General Lee's Last Strategic Offensive with the Army of Northern Virginia, October 1863. Bloomington, IN: Xlibris Corp., 2011. ISBN 978-1-4535-4990-2.

=== Bermuda Hundred Campaign ===
- Chick, Sean Michael. Grant's Left Hook: The Bermuda Hundred Campaign, May 5-June 7, 1864. Savas Beatie, 2020. ISBN 978-1-61121-483-3.
- Longacre, Edward G. Army of Amateurs: General Benjamin F. Butler and the Army of the James, 1863–1865. Mechanicsburg, PA: Stackpole Books, 1997. ISBN 0-8117-0135-2.
- Robertson, William G. Back Door to Richmond: The Bermuda Hundred Campaign, April–June 1864. Baton Rouge, Louisiana: Louisiana State University Press, 1987, 1991. ISBN 978-0-8071-1672-2.
- Wells, Bruce R. The Bermuda Hundred Campaign: The Creole and the Beast. Charleston, South Carolina: The History Press, 2011.

=== Chancellorsville Campaign ===
- Bigelow, John. The Chancellorsville Campaign: A Strategic and Tactical Study. New Haven, Connecticut: Yale University Press, 1910.
- Bryant, James K. The Chancellorsville Campaign: The Nation's High Water Mark. Charleston, South Carolina: The History Press, 2009. ISBN 9781596295940.
- Dodge, Theodore A. The Campaign of Chancellorsville, 2nd edition. Boston, Massachusetts: Ticknor & Fields, 1881.
- Fordney, Ben Fuller. Stoneman at Chancellorsville: The Coming of Age of Union Cavalry. Shippensburg, Pennsylvania: White Mane Publishing, 1998.
- Furgurson, Ernest B. Chancellorsville 1863: The Souls of the Brave. New York: Alfred A. Knopf, 1992. ISBN 0-394-58301-9.
- Gallagher, Gary W., ed. Chancellorsville: The Battle and Its Aftermath. Chapel Hill, North Carolina: University of North Carolina Press, 1996. ISBN 0-8078-2275-2.
- Keller, Christian B. Chancellorsville and the Germans: Nativism, Ethnicity, and Civil War Memory. New York: Doubleday, 2002.
- Lively, Mathew W. Calamity at Chancellorsville: The Wounding and Death of Confederate General Stonewall Jackson. Savas Beatie, LLC, 2013. ISBN 978-1-61121-138-2.
- Longacre: Edward G. The Commanders of Chancellorsville. Nashville, Tennessee: Rutledge Hill Press, 2005.
- Luvaas, Jay and Harold Nelson. The U.S. Army War College Guide to the Battles of Chancellorsville and Fredericksburg. South Mountain Press, Inc., 1988.
- Mackowski, Chris and Kristopher D. White. Chancellorsville and the High Tide of the Confederacy, May 1–4, 1863. El Dorado Hills, CA: Savas Beattie, LLC, 2014. ISBN 978-1-61121-281-5.
- Mackowski, Chris and Kristopher D. White. Chancellorsville’s Forgotten Front: The Battles of Second Fredericksburg and Salem Church, May 3, 1863. El Dorado Hills, California: Savas Beatie, LLC, 2013. ISBN 978-1-61121-136-8.
- McIntosh, David Gregg. The Campaign of Chancellorsville. Richmond, Virginia: W. E. James, 1915.
- Nelson, A. H. The Battles of Chancellorsville and Gettysburg. Minneapolis, Minnesota: no publisher listed, 1899.
- Parsons, Philip W. and Mac Wyckoff. The Union Sixth Army Corps in the Chancellorsville Campaign: A Study of the Engagements of Second Fredericksburg, Salem Church, and Banks's Ford, May 3–4, 1863. Jefferson, North Carolina: McFarland & Company, 2006.
- Richardson, Charles. The Chancellorsville Campaign: Fredericksburg to Salem Church. New York: Random House, 1987.
- Sears, Stephen W. Chancellorsville. New York: Mariner Books, 1996. ISBN 978-0-395-63417-2.
- Stackpole, Edward J. Chancellorsville: Lee's Greatest Battle. Harrisburg, Pennsylvania: Stackpole Books, 1958. ISBN 0-8117-2238-4.
- Sutherland, Daniel S. Fredericksburg and Chancellorsville: The Dare Mark Campaign. Lincoln, Nebraska: University of Nebraska Press, 1998. ISBN 978-0-8032-4253-1.

=== Battle of New Market ===
- Bierle, Sarah Kay. Call Out the Cadets: The Battle of New Market, May 15, 1865. Savas Beatie, 2019. ISBN 978-1-61121-469-7.
- Cocke, Preston. The Battle of New Market and the Cadets of the Virginia Military Institute. Richmond, Virginia, 1914.
- Davis, William C. The Battle of New Market. Garden City, New York: Doubleday & Company, Inc., 1975.
- DuPont, Henry. The Battle of New Market, Virginia, May 15, 1864. Winterthur, Delaware: published by author, 1923.
- Knight, Charles R. Valley Thunder: The Battle of New Market and the Opening of the Shenandoah Valley Campaign, May 1864. New York: Savas Beatie, 2010. ISBN 978-1-932714-80-7.
- Smith, George H. The Battle of New Market. Los Angeles, California: published by author, 1908.
- Smith, George H. The Positions and Movements of the Troops in the Battle of New Market. Los Angeles, California: published by author, 1913.
- Turner, Edward R. The New Market Campaign. Richmond, Virginia: Whittet & Sheperson, 1912.
- Whitehorne, Joseph W. A. The Battle of New Market. Washington, D. C.: U.S. Army Center of Military History, 1988.

=== Crook—Averell Raid on the Virginia & Tennessee Railroad ===
- McManus, Howard Rollins. The Battle of Cloyds Mountain: the Virginia and Tennessee railroad raid, April 29 – May 19, 1864. Lynchburg, Virginia: H.E. Howard, 1989.

=== First Bull Run/Manassas Campaign ===
- Davis, William C. Battle at Bull Run: A History of the First Major Campaign of the Civil War. New York: Doubleday & Company, 1977.
- Detzer, David. Dissonance: The Turbulent Days Between Fort Sumter and Bull Run. New York: Harcourt, 2006. ISBN 978-0-15-603064-9 (pbk.)
- Detzer, David. Donnybrook: The Battle of Bull Run, 1861. New York: Harcourt, 2004. ISBN 0-15-100889-2.
- Fry, James Barnet. McDowell and Tyler in the Campaign of Bull Run, 1861. New York: D. Van Nostrand, 1884.
- Gottfried, Bradley M. The Maps of First Bull Run: An Atlas of the First Bull Run (Manassas) Campaign, including the Battle of Ball's Bluff, June–October 1861. New York: Savas Beatie, 2009. ISBN 978-1-932714-60-9.
- Longacre, Edward G. The Early Morning of War: Bull Run, 1861. Norman, Oklahoma: University of Oklahoma Press, 2014. ISBN 978-0-8061-4498-6.
- McDonald, Joanna M. "We Shall Meet Again," The First Battle of Manassas (Bull Run), July 18–21, 1861. New York: Oxford University Press, 1999.
- Rafuse, Ethan. A Single Grand Victory: The First Campaign and Battle of Manassas. Scholarly Resources, 2002.

=== Fredericksburg Campaign ===
- Brooks, Victory. The Fredericksburg Campaign: November – December 1862. Conshohocken, Pennsylvania: Combined Books, 2001. ISBN 1-58097-033-8.
- Bryant, James K. The Battle of Fredericksburg: We Cannot Escape History. Charleston, South Carolina: The History Press, 2010.
- Gallagher, Gary W., ed. The Fredericksburg Campaign: Decision on the Rappahannock. Chapel Hill, North Carolina: University of North Carolina Press, 1995. ISBN 978-0-8078-5895-0.
- Henderson, G.F.R. The Campaign of Fredericksburg, Nov.–Dec., 1862, A Tactical Study for Officers. no publisher listed, 1886.
- Luvaas, Jay and Harold Nelson. The U.S. Army War College Guide to the Battles of Chancellorsville and Fredericksburg. South Mountain Press, Inc., 1988.
- Mackowski, Chris and Kristopher D. White. Simply Murder: The Battle of Fredericksburg, December 13, 1862. Savas Beatie, LLC, 2012. ISBN 978-1-61121-146-7.
- Marvel, William. The Battle of Fredericksburg. Conshohocken, Pennsylvania: Eastern National Park and Monument Association, 1993.
- O'Reilly, Francis Augustin. The Fredericksburg Campaign: Winter War on the Rappahannock. Baton Rouge, Louisiana: Louisiana University Press, 2006. ISBN 0-8071-2809-0.
- O'Reilly, Frank A. "Stonewall" Jackson at Fredericksburg: The Battle for Prospect Hill, December 13, 1862. Lynchburg, Virginia: H.E. Howard, Inc., 1993.
- Rable, George C. Fredericksburg! Fredericksburg! Chapel Hill, North Carolina: University of North Carolina Press, 2002. ISBN 0-8078-2673-1.
- Schultz, Duane. The Fate of War: Fredericksburg 1861. Yardley, Pennsylvania: Westholme Publishing, 2011.
- Stackpole, Edward J. Drama on the Rappahannock: The Fredericksburg Campaign. Harrisburg, Pennsylvania: Military Service Publishing, 1957.
- Sutherland, Daniel S. Fredericksburg and Chancellorsville: The Dare Mark Campaign. Lincoln, Nebraska: University of Nebraska Press, 1998. ISBN 978-0-8032-4253-1.
- Whan Jr., Vorin E. Fiasco at Fredericksburg. State College, Pennsylvania: Pennsylvania State University Press, 1961.

=== 1862 Maryland Campaign ===
- Armstrong, Marion V. Jr. Unfurl Those Colors! McClellan, Sumner, and the Second Army Corps in the Antietam Campaign. Tuscaloosa, Alabama: University of Alabama Press, 2008. ISBN 978-0-8173-1600-6.
- Bailey, Ronald H. The Bloodiest Day: The Battle of Antietam. Alexandria, Virginia: Time-Life Books, 1984. ISBN 0-8094-4740-1.
- Cannan, John. The Antietam Campaign. Gallery Books, 1990. ISBN 0-8317-0379-2.
- Cannan, John. The Antietam Campaign: August–September 1862. Mechanicsburg, Pennsylvania: Stackpole, 1994. ISBN 0-938289-91-8.
- Cannan, John. Burnside's Bridge: Antietam. Conshohocken, Pennsylvania: Combined Publishing, 2001. ISBN 0 85052 757 0.
- Carman, Ezra Ayers. The Maryland Campaign of September 1862, Vol. 1, South Mountain. Edited by Thomas G. Clemens. El Dorado Hills, California: Savas Beatie, 2010. ISBN 978-1-932714-81-4.
- Carman, Ezra Ayers. The Maryland Campaign of September 1862: Ezra A. Carman's Definitive Account of the Union and Confederate Armies at Antietam. Edited by Joseph Pierro. New York: Routledge, 2008. ISBN 0-415-95628-5.
- Cooling, Benjamin Franklin. Counter-thrust: From the Peninsula to the Antietam. Lincoln & London: University of Nebraska Press, 2007. ISBN 978-0-8032-1515-3.
- Ernst, Kathleen. Too Afraid to Cry: Maryland Civilians in the Antietam Campaign. Mechanicsburg, Pennsylvania: Stackpole Books, 2007.
- Frassanito, William A. Antietam: The Photographic Legacy of America's Bloodiest Day. New York: Scribner's, 1978.
- Gallagher, Gary W., ed. Antietam: Essays on the 1862 Maryland Campaign. Kent, Ohio: Kent State University Press, 1989. ISBN 0-87338-400-8.
- Gallagher, Gary W., ed. The Antietam Campaign. Chapel Hill, North Carolina: University of North Carolina Press, 1999. ISBN 08078-2481-X.
- Gottfried, Bradley M. The Maps of Antietam: An Atlas of the Antietam (Sharpsburg) Campaign, including the Battle of South Mountain, September 2–20, 1862. El Dorado Hills, California: Savas Beatie, 2011. ISBN 978-1-61121-086-6.
- Harsh, Joseph L. Sounding the Shallows: A Confederate Companion for the Maryland Campaign of 1862. Kent, Ohio: Kent State University Press, 2000. ISBN 0-87338-641-8.
- Harsh, Joseph L. Taken at the Flood: Robert E. Lee and Confederate Strategy in the Maryland Campaign of 1862 Kent, Ohio: Kent State University Press, 1999.
- Hartwig, D. Scott. To Antietam Creek: The Maryland Campaign of September 1862. Baltimore: The Johns Hopkins University Press, 2012. ISBN 978-1-4214-0631-2.
- Hartwig, D. Scott. I Dread the Thought of the Place: The Battle of Antietam and the End of the Maryland Campaign. Baltimore: The Johns Hopkins University Press, 2023.
- Heysinger, Isaac W. Antietam and the Maryland and Virginia Campaigns of 1862. New York: The Neale Publishing Company, 1912.
- Hoptak, John David. The Battle of South Mountain. Charleston, South Carolina: The History Press, 2001.
- Jamieson, Perry D. Death in September: The Antietam Campaign. Abilene, Texas: McWhiney Foundation Press, 1999. ISBN 1-893114-07-4.
- Johnson, Curt and Richard C. Anderson Jr. Artillery Hell: The Employment of Artillery at Antietam. College Station, Texas: Texas A&M University Press, 1995.
- Jordan, Brian M. Unholy Sabbath: The Battle of South Mountain in History and Memory, September 14, 1862. El Dorado Hills, California: Savas Beatie LLC, 2012. ISBN 978-1-61121-088-0.
- Luvaas, Jay and Harold W. Nelson, ed. The U.S. Army War College Guide to the Battle of Antietam: The Maryland Campaign of 1862. Carlisle, Pennsylvania: South Mountain Press, 1987.
- McPherson, James M. Crossroads of Freedom: Antietam, The Battle That Changed the Course of the Civil War. New York: Oxford University Press, 2002. ISBN 0-19-513521-0.
- McGrath, Thomas A. Shepherdstown: Last Clash of the Antietam Campaign, September 19–20, 1862. Schroeder Publications, 2007.
- Murfin, James V. The Gleam of Bayonets: The Battle of Antietam and the Maryland Campaign of 1862. Baton Rouge, Louisiana: Louisiana State University Press, 1965. ISBN 0-8071-0990-8.
- Priest, John M. Antietam: The Soldier's Battle New York: Oxford University Press, 1989. ISBN 0-19-508466-7.
- Priest, John M. Before Antietam: The Battle for South Mountain. Shippensburg, Pennsylvania: White Mane Publishing Co., 1992. ISBN 978-0-942597-37-0.
- Rafuse, Ethan S. Antietam, South Mountain & Harpers Ferry: A Battlefield Guide. Lincoln, Nebraska: Bison Books, 2008.
- Sears, Stephen W. Landscape Turned Red: The Battle of Antietam. New York: Ticknor and Fields, 1983.
- Stotelmyer, Steven R. Too Useful to Sacrifice: Reconsidering George B. McClellan’s Generalship in the Maryland Campaign from South Mountain to Antietam. Savas Beatie, 2019. ISBN 978-1-61121-304-1.
- Tucker, Phillip Thomas. Burnside's Bridge: The Climactic Struggle of the 2nd and 20th Georgia at Antietam Creek. Mechanicsburg, Pennsylvania: Stackpole Books, 2000. ISBN 0-8117-0199-9.
- Tucker, Phillip Thomas. Miller Cornfield at Antietam: The Civil War's Bloodiest Combat. The History Press, 2017. ISBN 9781625858658.
- Walker, Keven M. and K.C. Kirkman. Antietam Farmsteads: A Guide to the Battlefield Landscape. Western Maryland Interpretive Association, 2011.
- Whitman, T. Stephen. Antietam: Gateway to Emancipation. ABC-CLIO, Inc., 2012.

=== Overland Campaign ===
- Baltz, Louis J. The Battle of Cold Harbor, May 27-June 13, 1864. Lynchburg, Virginia: H.E. Howard, 1994.
- Bluford Jr., Robert. The Battle of Totopotomoy Creek, Polegreen Church and the Prelude to Cold Harbor. Charleston, South Carolina: The History Press, 2014. ISBN 978-1-62619-251-5.
- Cannan, John. Bloody Angle: Hancock's Assault on the Mule Shoe Salient, May 12, 1864. Cambridge, Massachusetts: Da Capo Press, 2002.
- Cannan, John. The Spotsylvania Campaign. Conshohocken, Pennsylvania: Combined Publishing, 1997.
- Cannan, John. The Wilderness Campaign: May 1864. Conshohocken, Pennsylvania: Combined Publishing, 1993. ISBN 0-306-81215-0.
- Davis, Daniel T. and Phillip S. Greenwalt. Hurricane from the Heavens: The Battle of Cold Harbor, May 26-June 5, 1864. El Dorado Hills, California: Savas Beatie LLC, 2014. ISBN 978-1-61121-187-0.
- Dunkerly, Robert M., Donald C. Pfanz, and David R. Ruth. No Turning Back: A Guide to the 1864 Overland Campaign, from the Wilderness to Cold Harbor, May 4 – June 13, 1864. Savas Beatie, 2014. ISBN 978-1-61121-193-1.
- Furgurson, Ernest B. Not War But Murder: Cold Harbor 1864. New York: Alfred A. Knopf, 2000. ISBN 0-679-45517-5.
- Gallagher, Gary W., ed. The Spottsylvania Campaign. Chapel Hill, North Carolina: University of North Carolina Press, 1998.
- Grimsley, Mark, And Keep Moving On: The Virginia Campaign, May–June 1864 Lincoln, Nebraska: Bison Books, 2005. ISBN 0-8032-7119-0.
- Jaynes, Gregory. The Killing Ground: Wilderness to Cold Harbor. Alexandria, Virginia: Time-Life Books, 1986. ISBN 0-8094-4768-1.
- Kelley, Dayton. General Lee and Hood's Texas Brigade at the Battle of the Wilderness. Hillsboro, Texas: Hill Junior College Press, 1969.
- McWhiney, Grady. Battle in the Wilderness: Grant Meets Lee. Fort Worth, Texas: Ryan Place Publishers, 1995.
- Mackowski, Chris and Kristopher D. White. A Season of Slaughter: The Battle of Spotsylvania Court House, May 8–21, 1864. Savas Beatie, LLC, 2013. ISBN 978-1-61121-148-1.
- Mackowski, Chris. Hell Itself: The Battle of the Wilderness, May 5–7, 1864. Savas Beatie, 2016. ISBN 978-1-61121-315-7.
- Mackowski, Chris. Strike Them A Blow: Battle along the North Anna River, May 21–25, 1864.. El Dorado Hills, California: Savas Beatie, LLC, 2015. ISBN 978-1-61121-254-9.
- Maney, R. Wayne. Marching to Cold Harbor: Victory and Failure, 1864. Shippensburg, Pennsylvania: White Mane, 1994.
- Matter, William D. If It Takes All Summer: The Battle of Spotsylvania. Chapel Hill, North Carolina: University of North Carolina Press, 1988.
- Miller, J. Michael. The North Anna Campaign: "Even to Hell Itself," May 21–26, 1864. Lynchburg, Virginia: H.E. Howard, Inc., 1989.
- Price, James S. The Battle of First Deep Bottom. Charleston, SC: The History Press, 2014. ISBN 978-1-60949-541-1.
- Price, James S. The Battle of New Market Heights: Freedom Will Be Theirs by the Sword. Charleston, SC: The History Press, 2011. ISBN 978-1-60949-038-6.
- Rhea, Gordon C., The Battle of the Wilderness May 5–6, 1864, Louisiana State University Press, 1994, ISBN 0-8071-1873-7.
- Rhea, Gordon C., The Battles for Spotsylvania Court House and the Road to Yellow Tavern May 7–12, 1864, Louisiana State University Press, 1997, ISBN 0-8071-2136-3.
- Rhea, Gordon C., To the North Anna River: Grant and Lee, May 13–25, 1864, Louisiana State University Press, 2000. ISBN 0-8071-2535-0.
- Rhea, Gordon C., Cold Harbor: Grant and Lee, May 26 - June 3, 1864, Louisiana State University Press, 2002. ISBN 0-8071-2803-1.
- Schaff, Morris. The Battle of the Wilderness. New York: Houghton Mifflin, 1910.
- Swank, Walbrook Davis. Battle of Trevelian Station: The Civil War's Greatest and Bloodiest All Cavalry Battle. Shippensburg, Pennsylvania: Burd Street Press, 1994. ISBN 0-942597-68-0.
- Steere, Edward. The Wilderness Campaign. Harrisburg, Pennsylvania: The Stackpole Co., 1960.
- Turner, John R. The Battle of the Wilderness!: The Part Taken by Mahone's Brigade. Petersburg, Virginia: Fenn & Owen, 1892.
- Wheelan, Joseph. Bloody Spring: Forty Days that Sealed the Confederacy's Fate. Da Capo Press, 2014. ISBN 978-0-306-82206-3.
- Wittenberg, Eric J. Glory Enough for All: Sheridan's Second Raid and the Battle of Trevilian Station. Washington, D.C.: Brassey's, 2002.

=== Peninsula Campaign ===
- Bailey, Ronald H. Forward to Richmond: McClellan's Peninsula Campaign. Alexandria, Virginia: Time-Life Books, 1983. ISBN 0-8094-4721-5.
- Barnard, John G. The Peninsular Campaign and Its Antecedents. New York: Van Nostrand, 1864.
- Beatie, Russel (2007). Army of the Potomac: McClellan's First Campaign, March - May 1862, Volume 3. Savas Beatie Publishers. ISBN 978-1-6112-1021-7.
- Broadwater, Robert P. The Battle of Fair Oaks: Turning Point of McClellan's Peninsula Campaign. Jefferson, North Carolina: McFarland & Company, Inc., Publishers, 2011. ISBN 978-0-7864-5878-3.
- Browning, Judkin. The Seven Days' Battles: The War Begins Anew. Santa Barbara, California: Greenwood Publishing Group, Inc., 2012.
- Burton, Brian K. Extraordinary Circumstances: The Seven Days Battles. Indianapolis, Indiana: Indiana University Press, 2001. ISBN 0-253-33963-4.
- Crenshaw, Douglas. The Battle of Glendale: Robert E. Lee’s Lost Opportunity. The History Press, 2017. ISBN 9781626198920.
- Crenshaw, Doug. Richmond Shall Not Be Given Up: The Seven Days' Battles, June 25-July 1, 1862. Savas Beatie, 2017. ISBN 978-1-61121-355-3.
- Cullen, Joseph P. The Peninsula Campaign 1862: McClellan & Lee Struggle for Richmond. Harrisburg, Pennsylvania: Stackpole Books, 1973.
- Dougherty, Kevin. The Peninsula Campaign of 1862: A Military Analysis. Jackson, Mississippi: University Press of Mississippi, 2005.
- Dowdey, Clifford. The Seven Days: The Emergence of Robert E. Lee. New York: The Fairfax Press, 1964.
- Fox III, John J. Stuart's Finest Hour: The Ride Around McClellan, June 1862. Angle Valley Press, 2014. ISBN 978-0-9711950-5-9.
- Gallagher, Gary W., ed. The Richmond Campaign of 1862: The Peninsula and the Seven Days. Chapel Hill, North Carolina: University of North Carolina Press, 2000.
- Hardy, Michael C. The Battle of Hanover Court House: Turning Point of the Peninsula Campaign, May 27, 1862. Jefferson, North Carolina: McFarland & Company Inc., 2011. ISBN 978-0-7864-6920-8.
- Hastings Jr., Earl C. and David Hastings. A Pitiless Rain: The Battle of Williamsburg, 1862. Shippensburg, Pennsylvania: White Mane Publishing Company, Inc., 1997. ISBN 1-57249-042-X.
- Marks, J. J. The Peninsula Campaign in Virginia. Philadelphia, Pennsylvania: J. B. Lippincott, 1864.
- Martin, David G. The Peninsula Campaign, March–July 1862. Conshohocken, Pennsylvania: Combined Books, 1992.
- Newton, Steven H. The Battle of Seven Pines, May 31 - June 1, 1862. Lynchburg, Virginia: H. E. Howard, Inc., 1993.
- Norder, Steve. Lincoln Takes Command: The Campaign to Seize Norfolk and the Destruction of the CSS Virginia. Savas Beatie, 2020. ISBN 978-1-61121-457-4.
- Quarstein, John V., and J. Michael Moore. Yorktown's Civil War Siege: Drums Along the Warwick. The History Press, 2012. ISBN 9781609496562.
- Sears, Stephen W. To the Gates of Richmond: The Peninsula Campaign New York, Ticknor and Fields, 1992. ISBN 0-89919-790-6.
- Spruill, Matt. Echoes of Thunder: A Guide to the Seven Days Battles. Knoxville, Tennessee: University of Tennessee Press, 2006.
- Stempel, Jim. The Battle of Glendale: The Day the South Nearly Won the Civil War. Jefferson, North Carolina: McFarland & Co., 2011. ISBN 978-0-7864-6300-8.
- Wheeler, Richard. Sword Over Richmond: An Eyewitness History of McClellan's Peninsula Campaign. New York: Harper & Row, Publishers, 1986. ISBN 0-06-015529-9.

=== Petersburg Campaign ===
- Abbott, Henry L. Siege Artillery in the Campaigns Against Richmond. New York: Van Nostrand, 1868.
- Alexander, Edward S. Dawn of Victory: Breakthrough at Petersburg, March 25 – April 2, 1865. El Dorado Hills, California: Savas Beatie, 2014. ISBN 978-1-61121-280-8.
- Axelrod, Alan. The Horrid Pit: The Battle of the Crater, the Civil War's Cruelest Mission. New York: Carroll & Graf Publishers, 2007. ISBN 0-7867-1811-0.
- Bearss, Edwin C. The Five Forks Campaign and the Fall of Petersburg: March 29 - April 2, 1865. El Dorado Hills, California: Savas Beatie, 2014. ISBN 978-1-611212-18-1.
- Bearss, Edwin C. Battle of the Weldon Railroad. no publisher listed, no date.
- Bearss, Edwin C. with Bryce A. Suderow. The Petersburg Campaign: The Eastern Front Battles, June - August 1864. El Dorado Hills, California: Savas Beatie, 2014. ISBN 978-1-61121-090-3.
- Bearss, Edwin C. with Bryce A. Suderow. The Petersburg Campaign: The Western Front Battles, September 1864 - April 1865. El Dorado Hills, California: Savas Beatie, 2014. ISBN 978-1-61121-104-7.
- Bowery Jr., Charles R. and Ethan S. Rafuse, eds. Guide to the Richmond–Petersburg Campaign. Lawrence, Kansas: University Press of Kansas, 2014. ISBN 978-0-7006-1960-3.
- Cannan, John. The Crater: Burnside's Assault on the Confederate Trenches June 30, 1864. New York: Da Capo Press, 2002. ISBN 0-306-81152-9.
- Cavanaugh, Michael A., and William Marvel, The Petersburg Campaign: The Battle of the Crater: "The Horrid Pit," June 25 - August 6, 1864. Lynchburg, Virginia: H.E. Howard, Inc., 1989.
- Chase, J. J. The Charge at Day–Break: Scenes and Incidents at the Battle of the Mine Explosion. Lewiston: Journal, 1875.
- Chick, Sean Michael. The Battle of Petersburg: June 15–18, 1864. Potomac Books, 2015. ISBN 9781612347127.
- Crenshaw, Douglas. Fort Harrison and the Battle of Chaffin's Farm: To Surprise and Capture Richmond. The History Press, 2013. ISBN 9781609495817.
- Cross, David Faris. A Melancholy Affair at the Weldon Railroad: The Vermont Brigade, June 23, 1864. Mechanicsburg, Pennsylvania: White Mane Publishing Co., Inc., 2003. ISBN 9781572493322.
- Davis, William C. Death in the Trenches: Grant at Petersburg. Alexandria, Virginia: Time-Life Books, 1986. ISBN 0-8094-4776-2.
- Eanes, Greg. Destroy the Junction: The Wilson-Kautz Raid and the Battle for Staunton River Bridge, June 21, 1864 to July 1, 1864. Lynchburg, Virginia: H. E. Howard, Inc., 1999.
- Elliott, Charles Pinckney. Elliott's Brigade: How It Held the Crater and Saved Petersburg. Savannah, Georgia: Review Print Co., 1900
- Fox III, John J. The Confederate Alamo: Bloodbath at Petersburg's Fort Gregg on April 2, 1865. Angle Valley Press, 2010.
- Greene, A. Wilson. A Campaign of Giants--The Battle for Petersburg: Volume 1: From the Crossing of the James to the Crater. Chapel Hill, North Carolina: University of North Carolina Press, 2018. ISBN 9781469638577.
- Greene, A. Wilson. The Final Battles of the Petersburg Campaign: Breaking the Backbone of the Rebellion. Knoxville, Tennessee: University of Tennessee Press, 2008. ISBN 978-1-57233-610-0.
- Hess, Earl J. In the Trenches at Patersburg: Field Fortifications and Confederate Defeat. Chapel Hill, North Carolina: University of North Carolina Press, 2009. ISBN 978-0-8078-3282-0.
- Hochling, A. A. and Mary. The Day Richmond Fell. San Diego, California: A. S. Barnes & Co., 1981.
- Hodgkins, William H. Battle of Fort Stedman (Petersburg, Virginia), March 25, 1865. Boston Massachusetts: no publisher listed, 1889.
- Horn, John E. The Destruction of the Weldon Railroad: Deep Bottom, Globe Tavern, and Reams Station, August 14–;25, 1864. Lynchburg, Virginia: H.E. Howard, Inc., 1991.
- Horn, John E. The Petersburg Campaign, June 1864–April 1865. Conshohocken, Pennsylvania: Combined Books, 1993.
- Horn, John. The Siege of Petersburg: The Battles for the Weldon Railroad, August 1864. El Dorado Hills, California: Savas Beatie LLC, 2015. ISBN 978-1-61121-216-7.
- Howe, Thomas J. The Petersburg Campaign: Wasted Valor June 15–18, 1864. Lynchburg, Virginia: H.E. Howard, 1988.
- Levin, Kevin M. Remembering The Battle of the Crater: War as Murder. University Press of Kentucky, 2012. ISBN 9780813136103.
- McCarthy, Michael. Confederate Waterloo: The Battle of Five Forks, April 1, 1865, and the Controversy that Brought Down a General. El Dorado Hills, California: Savas Beatie, 2017. ISBN 9781611213096.
- Newsome, Hampton. Richmond Must Fall: The Richmond-Petersburg Campaign, October 1864. Kent, Ohio: The Kent State University Press, 2013. ISBN 978-1-60635-132-1.
- Patrick, Rembert W. The Fall of Richmond. Baton Rouge, Louisiana: Louisiana State University Press, 1960.
- Pfanz, Donald. The Petersburg Campaign: Abraham Lincoln at City Point, March 20–April 9, 1865. Lynchburg, Virginia: H.E. Howard, 1989.
- Price, James S. The Battle of First Deep Bottom. The History Press, 2014. ISBN 9781609495411.
- Price, James S., and O. James Lighthizer. The Battle of New Market Heights: Freedom Will Be Theirs by the Sword. Charleston, South Carolina: The History Press, 2011. ISBN 9781609490386.
- Rasback, Dennis A. Joshua Lawrence Chamberlain and the Petersburg Campaign: His Supposed Charge from Fort Hell, his Near-Mortal Wound, and a Civil War Myth Reconsidered. Savas Beatie, 2016. ISBN 978-1-61121-306-5.
- Robertson, William Glenn. The Petersburg Campaign: The Battle of Old Men and Young Boys, June 9, 1864. Lynchburg, Virginia: H. E. Howard, 1989.
- Schutz, John F. The Battle of the Crater: A Complete History. Jefferson, North Carolina: McFarland Publishers, 2009.
- Slotkin, Richard. No Quarter: The Battle of the Crater 1864. New York: Random House, 2009. ISBN 978-1-4000-6675-9.
- Sommers, Richard J. Richmond Redeemed: The Siege at Petersburg. Garden City, New York: Doubleday, 1981. ISBN 9780385156264.

=== Second Manassas Campaign ===
- Block, Michael E. The Carnage Was Fearful: The Battle of Cedar Mountain, August 9, 1862. Savas Beatie, 2021. ISBN 978-1-61121-440-6.
- Gaff, Alan D. Brave Men's Tears: The Iron Brigade at Brawner Farm. Dayton, Ohio: Morningside Press, 1988.
- Greene, A. Wilson. The Second Battle of Manassas. National Park Service Civil War Series. Fort Washington, Pennsylvania: U.S. National Park Service and Eastern National, 2006. ISBN 0-915992-85-X.
- Hennessy, John J. Return to Bull Run: The Campaign and Battle of Second Manassas. New York: Simon & Schuster, 1993. ISBN 0-671-79368-3.
- Krick, Robert K. Stonewall Jackson at Cedar Mountain. Chapel Hill, North Carolina: University of North Carolina Press, 1990. ISBN 0-8078-5355-0.
- Langellier, John. Second Manassas 1862: Robert E. Lee's Greatest Victory. Oxford: Osprey Publishing, 2002. ISBN 1-84176-230-X.
- Martin, David G. The Second Bull Run Campaign July – August 1862. Conshohocken, Pennsylvania: Combined Books, 1997. ISBN 0-306-81332-7.
- Mauro, Charles V. The Battle of Chantilly (Ox Hill): A Monumental Storm. Fairfax, Virginia: Fairfax County History Commission, 2002. ISBN 0-914927-35-3.
- Patchan, Scott C. Second Manassas: Longstreet's Attack and the Struggle for Chinn Ridge. Washington, D.C.: Potomac Books, 2011. ISBN 978-1-59797-687-9.
- Stackpole, Edward J. From Cedar Mountain to Antietam. Harrisburg, Pennsylvania: Stackpole, 1959.
- Stewart, Nancy B. Rough Winds: The Battle of New Market. Broadway, Virginia: published by author, 1994.
- Taylor, Paul. He Hath Loosed the Fateful Lightning: The Battle of Ox Hill (Chantilly), September 1, 1862. Shippensburg, Pennsylvania: White Mane Publishers, 2003. ISBN 1-57249-329-1.
- Welker, David. Tempest at Ox Hill: The Battle of Chantilly. Cambridge, Massachusetts: Da Capo Press, 2002. ISBN 978-0-306-81118-0.

=== 1862 Shenandoah Valley Campaign ===
- Allan, William. History of the Campaign of Gen. T. J. (Stonewall) Jackson in the Shenandoah Valley of Virginia. Philadelphia, Pennsylvania: J. B. Lippincott, 1880.
- Armstrong, Richard L. The Battle of McDowell, March 11 – May 18, 1862. Lynchburg, Virginia: H. E. Howard, 1990
- Beck, Brandon H. and Charles S. Grunder. The First Battle of Winchester: May 25, 1862, Jackson's Valley Campaign. Lynchburg, Virginia: H.E. Howard, 1992.
- Clark, Champ. Decoying the Yanks: Jackson's Valley Campaign. Alexandria, Virginia: Time–Life Books, 1984. ISBN 0-8094-4725-8.
- Collins, Darrell. The Battles of Cross Keys and Port Republic. Lynchburg, Virginia: H.E. Howard, 1993.
- Cozzens, Peter. Shenandoah 1862: Stonewall Jackson's Valley Campaign. Chapel Hill, North Carolina: University of North Carolina Press, 2008. ISBN 978-0-8078-3200-4.
- Ecelbarger, Gary L. "We are in for it!": The First Battle of Kernstown. Shippensburg, Pennsylvania: White Mane Publishing Company, Inc., 1997. ISBN 1-57249-053-5.
- Gallagher, Gary W., ed. The Shenandoah Valley Campaign of 1862. Military Campaigns of the Civil War. Chapel Hill: University of North Carolina Press, 2003. ISBN 0-8078-2786-X.
- Krick, Robert K. Conquering the Valley: Stonewall Jackson at Port Republic. New York: William Morrow & Co., 1996. ISBN 0-688-11282-X.
- Martin, David G. Jackson's Valley Campaign: November 1861 - June 1862, revised edition. New York: Da Capo Press, 2007.
- Rankin, Thomas M. Stonewall Jackson's Romney Campaign, January 1–February 20, 1862. Lynchburg, Virginia: H. E. Howard, 1994.
- Reidenbaugh, Lowell. The Battle of Kernstown: Jackson's Valley Campaign. Lynchburg, Virginia: H.E. Howard, 1996.
- Tanner, Robert G. Stonewall in the Valley: Thomas J. "Stonewall" Jackson's Shenandoah Valley Campaign, Spring 1862. Garden City, NY: Doubleday, 1976. ISBN 978-0-385-12148-4.

=== 1864 Shenandoah Valley Campaign ===
- Bearss, Edwin C. The Battle of Monocacy: A Documented Report, edited by Brett Spaulding. Frederick, Maryland: Monocacy National Battlefield, 2003.
- Bernstein, Steven. The Confederacy's Last Northern Offensive: Jubal Early, the Army of the Valley and the Raid on Washington. Jefferson, North Carolina: McFarland & Company, Inc., Publishers, 2011. ISBN 978-0-7864-5861-5.
- Bible, Donahue. Vaughn's Brigade at Piedmont. Mohawk, Tennessee: Dodson Creek Publishers, 1995.
- Caramer, John H. Lincoln Under Fire: The Complete Account of His Experience during Early's Attack on Washington. Baton Rouge, Louisiana: Louisiana State University Press, 1948.
- Coker, Brad. The Battle of Monocacy. Baltimore, Maryland: University of Baltimore, 1982.
- Cooling III, Benjamin Franklin. The Day Lincoln Was Almost Shot: The Fort Stevens Story. Plymouth, United Kingdom: The Scarecrow Press, 2013. ISBN 978-0-8108-8622-3.
- Cooling, B. F. Jubal Early's Raid on Washington 1864. The Nautical & Aviation Publishing Company of America, Inc., 1989. ISBN 0-933852-86-X.
- Cooling, Benjamin F. Monocacy: The Battle That Saved Washington. Shippensburg, Pennsylvania: White Mane, 1997. ISBN 1-57249-032-2.
- Davis, Daniel T. and Phillip S. Greenwalt. Bloody Autumn: The Shenandoah Valley Campaign of 1864. El Dorado Hills, California: Savas Beatie, 2013. ISBN 978-1-61121-165-8.
- Debauter, Roger U. and Brandon H. Beck. Early's Valley Campaign: The Third Battle of Winchester. Lynchburg, Virginia: H.E. Howard, 1997.
- DuPont, H.A. The Campaign of 1864 in the Valley of Virginia and the Expedition to Lynchburg. New York: National American Society, 1925.
- Gallagher, Gary W., ed. The Shenandoah Valley Campaign of 1864. Chapel Hill, North Carolina: University of North Carolina Press, 2006.
- Gallagher, Gary W., ed. Struggle for the Shenandoah: Essays on the 1864 Valley Campaign. Kent, Ohio: Kent State University Press, 1991. ISBN 0-87338-429-6.
- Goldsborough, E. Y. Early's Great Raid ... Battle of Monocacy. no publisher listed, 1898.
- Haselberger, Fritz. Confederate Retaliation: McCausland's 1864 Raid. Shippensburg, Pennsylvania: Burd Street Press, 2001.
- Heatwole, John L. The Burning: Sheridan in the Shenandoah Valley. Charlottesville, Virginia: Rockbridge Pub., 1998.
- Judge, Joseph. Season of Fire: The Confederate Strike on Washington. Berryville, Virginia: Rockbridge Publishing Company, 1994.
- Leepson, Marc. Desperate Engagement: How a Little-Known Civil War Battle Saved Washington, D.C., and Changed American History. New York: Thomas Dunne Books/St. Martin's Press, 2007. ISBN 978-0-312-36364-2.
- Lepa, Jack H. The Shenandoah Valley Campaign of 1864. Jefferson, North Carolina: McFarland & Company Inc., 2003.
- Lewis, Thomas A. The Guns of Cedar Creek. New York: Dell Publishing, 1990.
- Lewis, Thomas A. and the Editors of Time-Life Books. The Shenandoah in Flames: The Valley Campaign of 1864. Alexandria, Virginia: Time–Life Books, 1987. ISBN 0-8094-4784-3.
- Marh, Theodore C. Early's Valley Campaign: The Battle of Cedar Creek, Showdown in the Shenandoah, October 1–31, 1864. Lynchburg, Virginia: H.E. Howard, 1992.
- Meaney, Peter J. The Civil War Engagement at Cool Sprint, July 18, 1864. Berryville, Virginia: published by author, ca. 1980.
- Michel. Robert E. Colonel Harry Gilmor's Raid Around Baltimore. Baltimore, Maryland: Erbe Publishers, 1976.
- Miller, William J. Decision at Tom's Brook: George Custer, Thomas Rosser, and the Joy of the Fight. Savas Beatie, 2016. ISBN 978-1-61121-308-9.
- Noyalas, Jonathan A. The Battle of Cedar Creek: Victory From the Jaws of Defeat. Charleston, South Carolina: The History Press, 2009. ISBN 9781596295933.
- Noyalas, Jonathan A. The Battle of Fisher's Hill: Breaking the Shenandoah Valley's Gibraltar. Charleston, South Carolina: The History Press, 2013. ISBN 978-1-60949-443-8.
- Roe, Alfred. Monocacy. Baltimore, Maryland: Toomy Press, 1996.
- Patchan, Scott C. The Battle of Piedmont and Hunter's Raid on Staunton: The 1864 Shenandoah Campaign. Charleston, South Carolina: The History Press, 2011. ISBN 9781609491970.
- Patchan, Scott C. Forgotten Fury: The Battle of Piedmont. Fredericksburg, Virginia: Sgt. Kirkland Museum and Historical Society, Inc., 1996.
- Patchan, Scott C. Shenandoah Summer: The 1864 Valley Campaign. Lincoln, Nebraska: University of Nebraska Press, 2007. ISBN 978-0-8032-3754-4.
- Patchan, Scott C. The Last Battle of Winchester: Phil Sheridan, Jubal Early, and the Shenandoah Valley Campaign, August 7 – September 19, 1864. Savas Beatie, LLC, 2013. ISBN 978-1-932714-98-2.
- Pond, George E. The Shenandoah Valley in 1864. New York: Charles Scribner's Sons, 1883.
- Powell, David A. Union Command Failure in the Shenandoah: Major General Franz Sigel and the War in the Valley of Virginia, May 1864. Savas Beatie, 2019. ISBN 978-1-61121-434-5.
- Quint, Ryan T. Determined to Stand and Fight: The Battle of Monocacy, July 9, 1864. Savas Beatie, 2017. ISBN 978-1-61121-346-1.
- Schairer, Jack E. Lee's Bold Plan for Point Lookout: The Rescue of Confederate Prisoners That Never Happened. Jefferson, North Carolina: McFarland Publishers.
- Spaulding, Brett W. Last Chance for Victory: Jubal Early's 1864 Maryland Invasion. Gettysburg, Pennsylvania: Thomas Publications, 2012.
- Vandiver, Frank E. Jubal's Raid: General Early's Famous Attack on Washington in 1864. Lincoln: University of Nebraska Press, 1988. ISBN 978-0-8032-9610-7.
- Walker, Gary C. Hunter's Fiery Raid Through Virginia Valleys. Roanoke: A&W Enterprise, 1989.
- Wenger, Warren D. Monocacy: The Defeat that Saved Washington, D.C. Bridgeton, New Jersey: Eugene Printing, 1996.
- Wert, Jeffry D. From Winchester to Cedar Creek: The Shenandoah Valley Campaign of 1864. Carlisle, Pennsylvania: South Mountain Press, 1987.
- Williams Jr., Richard G. The Battle of Waynesboro. Charleston, South Carolina: The History Press, 2014. ISBN 978-1-62619-070-2.
- Worthington, Glenn H. Fighting For Time, or the Battle That Saved Washington and Mayhap the Union. Frederick, Maryland: Frederick County Historical Society, 1932.

=== Siege of Suffolk ===
- Cormier, Steven A. The Siege of Suffolk: The Forgotten Campaign. Lynchburg, Virginia: H. E. Howard, 1989.

=== Stoneman's 1865 Raid ===
- Blackwell, Joshua Beau. The 1865 Stoneman Raid Begins: Leave Nothing for the Rebellion to Stand Upon. Charleston, South Carolina: The History Press, 2011. ISBN 978-1-59629-849-1.
- Blackwell, Joshua Beau. The 1865 Stoneman's Raid Ends: Follow Him to the Ends of the Earth. Charleston, South Carolina: History Press, 2011.
- Hartley, Chris J. Stoneman's Raid, 1865. Winston–Salem, North Carolina: John F. Blair, Publisher, 2010. ISBN 978-0-89587-377-4.

=== Western Virginia Campaign ===
- Andre, Richard, Stan Cohen, and William D. Wintz. Bullets & Steel: The Fight for the Great Kanawha Valley, 1861–1865. Charleston, West Virginia: Pictorial Histories Publishing Company, Inc., 1995.
- Carnes, Eva Margaret. The Tygarts Valley Line: June – July, 1861. Philippi, West Virginia: First Land Battle of the Civil War Centennial Commemoration, Inc., 1961.
- Carring, C. H. Cheat Mountain: Unwritten Chapter of the Late War. Nashville, Tennessee: Albert B. Tavel, Stationer and Printer, 1885.
- Graham, Michael B. The Coal River Valley in the Civil War: West Virginia Mountains, 1861. Charleston, South Carolina: The History Press, 2014. ISBN 978-1-62619-660-5.
- Hall, Granville Davisson. Lee's Invasion of Northwestern Virginia in 1861. Chicago, Illinois: The Mayer & Miller Company, 1911.
- Haselberger, Fritz. Yanks from the South! The First Land Campaign of the Civil War: Rich Mountain, West Virginia. Baltimore, Maryland: Past Glories, 1987.
- Lesser, W. Hunter. Battle at Corricks Ford: Confederate Disaster and Loss of a Leader. Parsons, West Virginia: McClain Printing Company, Inc., 1993.
- Lesser, W. Hunter. Rebels at the Gate: Lee and McClellan on the Front Line of a Nation Divided. Naperville, Illinois: Sourcebooks, Inc., 2004. ISBN 1-57071-747-8.
- Lowry, Terry. September Blood: The Battle of Carnifex Ferry. Charleston, West Virginia: Pictorial Histories Publishing Company, 1985.
- McKinney, Tim. Robert E. Lee at Sewell Mountain: The West Virginia Campaign. Charleston, West Virginia: Pictorial Histories Publishing Co., Inc., 1990.
- Newell, Clayton R. Lee Vs. McClellan: The First Campaign. Washington, D.C.: Regnary Publishing Inc., 1996. ISBN 0-89526-452-8
- Zinn, Jack. The Battle of Rich Mountain. Parsons, West Virginia: McClain Printing Company 1971.
- Zinn, Jack R. E. Lee's Cheat Mountain Campaign. Parsons, West Virginia: McClain Printing Company, 1974.

=== Wilmington Campaign ===
- Fonvielle Jr., Chris E. Fort Anderson: Battle for Wilmington. New York: Da Capo Press, 1999. ISBN 1-882810-40-6.
- Fonvielle Jr., Chris E. Last Rays of Departing Hope: The Wilmington Campaign. Savas Publishing Company, 1997. ISBN 1-882810-09-0.
- Gragg, Rod. Confederate Goliath: The Battle of Fort Fisher. HarperCollins, 1991. ISBN 0-06-016096-9.
- Lamb, William. Colonel William Lamb's Story of Fort Fisher. Carolina Beach, North Carolina: Blockade Runner Museum, 1966.
- McCaslin, Richard B. The Last Stronghold: The Campaign for Fort Fisher. Abilene, Texas: McWhiney Foundation Press, McMurry University, 2003. ISBN 1-893114-31-7.
- McLean, Alexander Torrey. The Fort Fisher and Wilmington Campaign, 1864–1865. Chapel Hill, North Carolina: University of North Carolina Press, 1969.
- Moore, Mark A. Wilmington Campaign and the Battles for Fort Fisher. New York: Savas Publishing, 1999.

=== Gettysburg Campaign ===
- (no author listed) "Corbit's Charge": Civil War Self–Tour in Westminster, Maryland. Westminster, Maryland: Carroll County Visitor Center, no date.
- Adkin, Mark. The Gettysburg Companion: The Complete Guide to America's Most Famous Battle. Harrisburg, Pennsylvania: Stackpole Books, 2008. ISBN 978-0-8117-0439-7.
- Albright, Harry. Gettysburg: Crisis of Command. Hippocrene Books, 1991.
- Bates, Samuel P. The Battle of Gettysburg. Philadelphia, Pennsylvania: T. H. Darrs & Co., 1875.
- Beecham, Robert K. Gettysburg, The Pivotal Battle of the War. Chicago, Illinois: A. C. McClurg & Co., 1911.
- Bennett, Gerald R. Days of "Uncertainty and Dread": The Ordeal Endured by the Citizens of Gettysburg. Littlestown, Pennsylvania: published by the author, 1994.
- Bilby, Joseph G. Small Arms at Gettysburg: Infantry and Cavalry Weapons in America's Greatest Battle. Westholme Publishing, 2007.
- Bloom, Robert L. We Never Expected a Battle: The Ordeal Endured by the Citizens at Gettysburg. Littlestown, Pennsylvania: published by author, 1988.
- Boritt, Gabor S., ed. The Gettysburg Nobody Knows. Oxford University Press, 1997.
- Bowden, Scott and Bill Ward. Last Chance for Victory: Robert E. Lee and the Gettysburg Campaign. New York: Savas Beatie, 2001. ISBN 1-882810-65-1.
- Brenneman, Chris and Sue Boardman. The Gettysburg Cyclorama: The Turning Point of the Civil War on Canvas. Savas Beatie, 2015. ISBN 978-1-61121-264-8.
- Busey, John W. and David G. Martin. Regimental Strengths and Losses at Gettysburg. Hightstown, New Jersey: Longstreet House, 1994.
- Carhart, Tom. Lost Triumph: Lee's Real Plan at Gettysburg – and Why It Failed. New York: G. P. Putnam's Sons, 2005. ISBN 0-399-15249-0.
- Catton, Bruce. Gettysburg: The Final Fury. Garden City, New York: Doubleday and Co., 1974.
- Clark, Champ. Gettysburg: The Confederate High Tide. Alexandria, Virginia: Time-Life Books, 1985. ISBN 0-8094-4758-4.
- Coco, Gregory A. A Strange and Blighted Land – Gettysburg: The Aftermath of a Battle. Gettysburg, Pennsylvania: Thomas Publications, 1995.
- Coddington, Edwin B. The Gettysburg Campaign: A Study in Command. New York: Scribner's, 1968. ISBN 0-684-84569-5.
- Cole, James and Roy E. Frampton. The Gettysburg National Cemetery: A History and Guide. Hanover, Pennsylvania: Sheridan, 1988.
- Cole, Philip M. Civil War Artillery at Gettysburg. Cambridge, Massachusetts: Da Capo Press, 2002.
- Coleman, W. Stephen. Discovering Gettysburg: An Unconventional Introduction to the Greatest Little Town in America and the Monumental Battle that Made It Famous. Savas Beatie, 2017. ISBN 978-1-61121-353-9.
- Desjardin, Thomas A. The Monuments at Gettysburg. Gettysburg, Pennsylvania: Friends of the National Parks at Gettysburg, Inc., 1997.
- Diffendorfer, G.M. Cumberland County's Bit in the Gettysburg Campaign As It Might Have Been Viewed by an Eyewitness Almost a Century Ago. Carlisle, Pennsylvania: Cumberland Valley Savings & Loan Assoc., 1962.
- Downey, Fairfax The Guns at Gettysburg. New York: David Mackay Co., 1958.
- Dunkelman, Mark H. The Coster Avenue Mural in Gettysburg. Privately published, 1989.
- Dundelman, Mark H. Gettysburg's Unknown Soldier: The Life, Death, and Celebrity of Amos Humiston. Westport, Connecticut: Praeger Press, 2000.
- Fielbeger, G. J. The Campaign and Battle of Gettysburg. West Point, New York: United States Military Academy Press, 1915.
- Frassanito, William A. Gettysburg: A Journey in Time. New York: Charles Scribner's Sons, 1975.
- Gallagher, Gary W., ed. Three Days at Gettysburg: Essays on Confederate and Union Leadership. Kent, Ohio: Kent State University Press, 1999. ISBN 0-87338-629-9.
- Gallagher, Gary W., ed. The Third Day at Gettysburg & Beyond. Chapel Hill, North Carolina: University of North Carolina Press, 1994. ISBN 08078-2155-1.
- Gindlesperger, James and Suzanne. So You Think You Know Gettysburg: The Stories Behind the Monuments and the Men Who Fought One of America's Most Epic Battles. John F. Blair, 2010.
- Goodyear, Samuel M. General Robert E. Lee's Invasion of Carlisle, 1863. Carlisle, Pennsylvania: 1942.
- Gottfried, Bradley M. Brigades of Gettysburg: The Union and Confederate Brigades at the Battle of Gettysburg. Cambridge, Massachusetts: Da Capo Press, 2003.
- Gottfried, Bradley M. Roads to Gettysburg: Lee's Invasion of the North, 1863. Shippensburg, Pennsylvania: White Mane Books, 2001. ISBN 1-57249-284-8.
- Gragg, Rod. The Illustrated Gettysburg Reader: An Eyewitness History of the Civil War's Greatest Battle. New York: Regnary House, 2013.
- Green, Charles O. An Incident in the Battle of Middleburg, Va., June 17, 1863. Providence, Rhode Island: 1911.
- Guelzo, Allen C. Gettysburg: The Last Invasion. New York: Vintage Books, 2013. ISBN 978-0-385-34964-2.
- Hall, Jeffry C. The Stand of the U.S. Army at Gettysburg. Indianapolis, Indiana: Indiana University Press, 2003. ISBN 0-253-34258-9.
- Harman, Troy D. Lee's Real Plan at Gettysburg. Mechanicsburg, Pennsylvania: Stackpole Books, 2003. ISBN 0-8117-0054-2.
- Haskell, Frank Aretas. The Battle of Gettysburg. Whitefish, Montana: Kessinger Publishing, 2006. ISBN 978-1-4286-6012-0.
- Hessler, James A. Sickles at Gettysburg: The Controversial Civil War General Who Committed Murder, Abandoned Little Round Top, and Declared Himself the Hero of Gettysburg. Savas Beatie, LLC, 2010. ISBN 978-1-932714-84-5.
- Hoke, Jacob. The Great Invasion of 1863, or General Lee in Pennsylvania. Dayton, Ohio: W. J. Shuey, 1887.
- Hunt, Jeffrey W. Meade and Lee After Gettysburg: The Forgotten Final Stage of the Gettysburg Campaign, from Falling Waters to Culpeper Court House, July 14–31, 1863. Savas Beatie, 2017. ISBN 978-1-61121-343-0.
- Jacobs, Michael. Notes on the Rebel Invasion and the Battle of Gettysburg. Philadelphia, Pennsylvania: J.B. Lippincott, Co., 1864.
- Johnson, Jennifer. Gettysburg: The Bloodiest Battle of the Civil War. Scholastic Library Pub, 2009.
- Luvaas, Jay, and Harold W. Nelson. The U.S. Army War College Guide to the Battle of Gettysburg. 1986.
- Marshall, Francis. The Battle of Gettysburg: The Crest–Wave of the American Civil War. New York: The Neale Publishing Co., 1914.
- Miers, Earl Schenk, and Richard A. Brown Gettysburg. New Brunswick: Rutgers University Press, 1948.
- Mingus Sr., Scott L. Flames Beyond the Susquehanna: The Confederate Expedition to the Susquehanna River, June 1863. El Dorado Hills, California: Savas Beatie, 2011. ISBN 978-1-611210-72-9.
- Nesbitt, Mark. Saber & Scrapegoat: J.E.B. Stuart and the Gettysburg Controversy. Mechanicsburg, Pennsylvania: Stackpole Books, 1994.
- Newsome, Hampton. Gettysburg's Southern Front: Opportunity and Failure at Richmond. Lawrence, Kansas: University Press of Kansas, 2022. ISBN 9780700633470.
- Newton, George. Silent Sentinels: A Reference Guide to the Artillery at Gettysburg. New York: Savas Beatie, 2005. ISBN 1-932714-14-6.
- Nofi, Albert A. The Gettysburg Campaign: June – July 1863. Conshohocken, Pennsylvania: Combined Books, 1986. ISBN 978-0-938289-24-1.
- Nye, Wilbur Sturtevant. Here Come the Rebels!. Morningside Bookshop, 1988. ISBN 0-89029-080-6.
- Orrison, Robert and Dan Welsh. The Last Road North: A Guide to the Gettysburg Campaign, 1863. Savas Beatie, 2016. ISBN 978-1-61121-243-3.
- Palmer, Michael A. Lee Moves North: Robert E. Lee on the Offensive. New York: John Wiley & Sons, 1998.
- Peladeau, Marius B., comp. Burnished Rows of Steel: Vermont's Role in the Battle of Gettysburg, July 1–3, 1863. Newport, Vermont: Vermont Civil War Enterprises, 2002.
- Petruzzi, J. David, and Steven Stanley. The Complete Gettysburg Guide. New York: Savas Beatie, 2009. ISBN 978-1-932714-63-0.
- Pfanz, Harry W. The Battle of Gettysburg. National Park Service Civil War series. Fort Washington, Pennsylvania: U.S. National Park Service and Eastern National, 1994. ISBN 0-915992-63-9.
- Raus, Edmund J. A Generation on the March: The Union Army at Gettysburg. Gettysburg, Pennsylvania: Thomas Publications, 1998.
- Reardon, Carol. Pickett's Charge in History and Memory. Chapel Hill: University of North Carolina Press, 1997. ISBN 0-8078-2379-1.
- Rollins, Richard. The Damned Red Flags of the Rebellion: The Confederate Battle Flag at Gettysburg. Redondo Beach, California: Rank and File Publications, 1997.
- Ryan, Thomas J. Spies, Scouts, and Secrets in the Gettysburg Campaign. El Dorado, CA: Savas Beatie LLC, 2015. ISBN 978-1-61121-178-8.
- Sauers, Richard A. A Caspian Sea of Ink: The Meade–Sickles Controversy. Baltimore, Maryland: Butternut and Blue, 1989.
- Schildt, John W. Roads to Gettysburg. Parsons, West Virginia: McLain Printing Co., 1978.
- Scott, James H. P. The Story of the Battles at Gettysburg. Harrisburg, Pennsylvania: Harrisburg Telegraph Press, 1927.
- Sears, Stephen W. Gettysburg. Houghton Mifflin, 2003. ISBN 978-0-395-86761-7.
- Smith, Timothy H. The Story of Lee's Headquarters, Gettysburg, Pennsylvania. Gettysburg, Pennsylvania: Thomas Publications, 1995.
- Spruill, Mark. Decisions at Gettysburg: The Nineteen Critical Decisions That Defined the Campaign. Knoxville, Tennessee: University of Tennessee Press, 2011.
- Stackpole, Edward J. They Met at Gettysburg. New York: Bonanza Books, 1956.
- Stanley, Steven and J. David Petruzzi. The Gettysburg Campaign in Numbers and Losses: Synopses, Orders of Battle, Strengths, Casualties, and Maps, June 9 – July 14, 1863. Savas Beatie, LLC, 2013. ISBN 978-1-611210-80-4.
- Tagg, Larry R. The Generals at Gettysburg: The Leaders of America's Greatest Battle. Mason City, Iowa: Savas Publishing Co., 1998.
- Thomas, Dean S. Ready . . . Aim . . . Fire!: Small Arms Ammunition in the Battle of Gettysburg.
- Trudeau, Noah Andre. Gettysburg: A Testing of Courage. New York: HarperCollins, 2002. ISBN 0-06-019363-8.
- Tucker, Glenn. High Tide at Gettysburg: The Campaign in Pennsylvania. 1958.
- Weeks, Jim. Gettysburg: Memory, Market, and an American Shrine. Princeton, New Jersey: Princeton University Press, 2003.
- Wheeler, Richard. Gettysburg 1863: Campaign of Endless Echoes. Plume, 1999.
- Wheeler, Richard. Witness to Gettysburg. Mechanicsburg, Pennsylvania: Stackpole Books, 2006.
- Wilson, Clyde Norman. The Most Promising Young Man of the South: James Johnston Pettigrew and His Men at Gettysburg. McWhiney Foundation Press, 1998.
- Wilson, James Harrison. Captain Charles Corbit's Charge at Westminster: An Episode of the Gettysburg Campaign. Wilmington, Delaware: 1913.
- Wingert, Cooper H. The Confederate Approach on Harrisburg: The Gettysburg Campaign's Northernmost Reaches. Charleston, South Carolina: The History Press, 2012. ISBN 978-1-60949-858-0.
- Woodworth, Steven E. Beneath a Northern Sky: A Short History of the Gettysburg Campaign. Scholarly Resources, 2003. ISBN 0-8420-2933-8.
- Wynstra, Robert J. The Rashness of the Hour: Politics, Gettysburg, and the Downfall of Confederate Brigadier General Alfred Iverson. New York: Savas Beatie, 2011.
- Young, Jess Bowman. The Battle of Gettysburg: A Comprehensive Narrative. New York: Harper & Bros., 1913.

==== Cavalry in the Gettysburg Campaign ====
- Brooke–Rawle, William. The Right Flank at Gettysburg: An Account of the Operations of General Gregg's Cavalry Command. Philadelphia, Pennsylvania: published by author, 1905.
- Longacre, Edward. The Cavalry at Gettysburg: A Tactical Study of Mounted Operations during the Civil War's Pivotal Campaign, 9 June - 14 July 1863. Lincoln, Nebraska: University of Nebraska Press, 1993. ISBN 978-0-8032-7941-4.
- Mosby, John S. Stuart's Cavalry in the Gettysburg Campaign. New York: Moffat, Yard & Co., 1908.
- Newhall, F.C. How Lee Lost the Use of His Cavalry before the Battle of Gettysburg. Philadelphia, Pennsylvania: 1878.
- O'Neill Jr. Robert F. The Cavalry Battles of Aldie, Middleburg and Upperville, Small but Important Riots, June 10–27, 1863. Lynchburg, Virginia: H.E. Howard Co., 1993.
- Phipps, Michael. "Come On You Wolverines!": Custer at Gettysburg. Gettysburg, Pennsylvania: Farnsworth House Military Impressions, 1995.
- Riggs, David F. East of Gettysburg: Stuart vs. Custer. Bellevue, Nebraska: Olde Army Press, 1970.
- Robinson, Warren C. Jeb Stuart and the Confederate Defeat at Gettysburg. Lincoln, Nebraska: University of Nebraska Press, 2007. ISBN 978-0-8032-1101-8.
- Rummel III, George A. Cavalry on the Roads to Gettysburg: Kilpatrick at Hanover and Hunterstown. Shippensburg, Pennsylvania: White Mane, 2000.
- Trowbridge, Luther S. The Operations of the Cavalry in the Gettysburg Campaign. Detroit, Michigan: 1888.
- Walker, Paul D. The Cavalry Battle that Saved the Union: Custer vs. Stuart at Gettysburg. Gretna, Louisiana: Pelican Publishing Co., 2002.
- Wittenberg, Eric J. Gettysburg's Forgotten Cavalry Actions. Gettysburg, Pennsylvania: Thomas Publications, 1998.
- Wittenberg, Eric J. Protecting the Flank: The Battles for Brinkerhoff's Ridge and East Cavalry Field, Gettysburg, Pennsylvania. Celina, Ohio: Ironclad Publishing, 2002.
- Wittenberg, Eric J. and J. David Petruzzi. Plenty of Blame to Go Around: Jeb Stuart's Controversial Ride to Gettysburg. New York: Savas Beatie, 2006.

==== Battle of Brandy Station ====
- Beattie, Dan. Brandy Station 1863: First Step Towards Gettysburg. United Kingdom: Osprey Publishing, 2009.
- Borcke, Heros Von and Justus Scheibert. The Great Cavalry Battle of Brandy Station. Winston–Salem, North Carolina: Palaemon Press, 1976.
- Crouch, Richard E. Brandy Station: A Battle Like No Other.
- Downey, Fairfax. Clash of Cavalry: The Battle of Brandy Station, June 9, 1863. New York: David McKay 1959.
- McKinney, Joseph W. Brandy Station, Virginia, June 9, 1863: The Largest Cavalry Battle of the Civil War. Jefferson, North Carolina: McFarland & Co., 2006.
- Wittenberg, Eric J. The Battle of Brandy Station, June 9, 1863: North America's Largest Cavalry Battle. Charleston, South Carolina: The History Press, 2010.
- Wittenber, Eric J. and Daniel T. Davis. Out Flew the Sabres: The Battle of Brandy Station, June 9, 1863. Savas Beatie, 2016. ISBN 978-1-61121-256-3.

==== Second Battle of Winchester ====
- Beck, Brandon H. and Charles S. Grunder. The Second Battle of Winchester, June 12–15, 1863. Lynchburg, Virginia: H. E. Howard, Inc., 1989.
- Downey, Fairfax. Clash of Cavalry: The Battle of Brandy Station, June 9, 1863. New York: 1959.
- Maier, Larry B. Gateway to Gettysburg: The Second Battle of Winchester. Shippensburg, Pennsylvania: Burd Street Press, 2002. ISBN 1-57249-287-2.
- Wittenberg, Eric J. and Scott L. Mingus Sr. The Second Battle of Winchester: The Confederate Victory that Opened the Door to Gettysburg. Savas Beatie, 2016. ISBN 978-1-61121-288-4.

==== Battle of Hanover ====
- (no author listed) Encounter at Hanover: Prelude to Gettysburg. Hanover, Pennsylvania: 1963.
- Anthony, William. History of the Battle of Hanover, (York County, Pennsylvania) Tuesday, June 30, 1863. Hanover, Pennsylvania: published by the author, 1945.
- The Historical Publication Committee of the Hanover Chamber of Commerce. Prelude to Gettysburg: Encounter at Hanover. Shippensburg, Pennsylvania: Burd Street Press, 1962.

==== Battle of Gettysburg First Day ====
- Beck, Brandon H. and Charles S. Grunder. The Second Battle of Winchester, June 12–15, 1863. Lynchburg, Virginia: H. E. Howard, Inc., 1989.
- Biddle, Chapman. The First Day of the Battle of Gettysburg. Philadelphia, Pennsylvania: J. B. Lippencott, 1880.
- Gallagher, Gary W., ed. The First Day at Gettysburg: Essays on Confederate and Union Leadership. Kent, Ohio: Kent State University Press, 1992. ISBN 0-87338-457-1.
- Hassler Jr., Warren W. Crisis at the Crosswords: The First Day at Gettysburg. Tuscaloosa, Alabama: University of Alabama Press, 1970.
- Herdegen, Lance J., and William J. K. Beaudot. In the Bloody Railroad Cut at Gettysburg. Dayton, Ohio: Morningside Press, 1990.
- Mackowski, Chris, Kristopher D. White, and Daniel T. Davis. Fight Like the Devil: The First Day at Gettysburg, July 1, 1863. El Dorado Hills, California: Savas Beatie, 2015. ISBN 978-1-61121-227-3.
- Martin, David G. Gettysburg July 1, revised edition. Conshohocken, Pennsylvania: Combined Books, 1996. ISBN 0-938289-81-0.
- Newton, Steven H. McPherson's Ridge: The First Battle for the High Ground, July 1, 1863. Cambridge, Massachusetts: DaCapo Press, 2002.
- Pfanz, Harry W. Gettysburg – The First Day. Chapel Hill, North Carolina: University Press of North Carolina, 2001. ISBN 0-8078-2624-3.
- Shue, Richard S. Morning at Willoughby Run: The Opening Battle at Gettysburg July 1, 1863. Gettysburg, Pennsylvania: Thomas Publications, 1998. ISBN 0-939631-74-1.

==== Battle of Gettysburg Second Day ====
- Bigelow, John. The Peach Orchard, Gettysburg, July 2, 1863. Minneapolis, Minnesota: Kimball–Storer Co., 1910.
- Gallagher, Gary W., ed. The Second Day at Gettysburg: Essays on Confederate and Union Leadership. Kent, Ohio: Kent State University Press, 1993.
- Hessler, James A. and Britt C. Isenberg. Gettysburg’s Peach Orchard: Longstreet, Sickles, and the Bloody Fight for the "Commanding Ground" Along the Emmitsburg Road. Savas Beatie, 2019. ISBN 978-1-61121-455-0.
- Imhof, John D. Gettysburg: Day Two – A Study In Maps. Baltimore, Maryland: Butternut & Blue, 1999. ISBN 0-935523-70-7.
- LaFantasie, Glenn. W. Twilight at Little Round Top: July 2, 1863 – The Tide Turns at Gettysburg. Hoboken, New Jersey: John Wiley & Sons, Inc., 2005. ISBN 0-471-46231-4.
- Mackowski, Chris, Kristopher D. White, and Daniel T. Davis. Don't Give an Inch: The Second Day at Gettysburg, July 2, 1863 – From Little Round Top to Cemetery Ridge. El Dorado Hills, California: Savas Beatie, 2016. ISBN 978-1-61121-229-7.
- Mingus Sr., Scott L. and David L. Shultz. The Second Day at Gettysburg: The Attack and Defense of the Union Center on Cemetery Ridge, July 2, 1863. Savas Beatie, LLC, 2013. ISBN 978-1-611210-74-3.
- Norton, Oliver W. The Attack and Defense of Little Round Top: Gettysburg, July 2, 1863. New York: Neale, 1913.
- Pfanz, Harry W. Gettysburg: The Second Day. Chapel Hill, North Carolina: University of North Carolina Press, 1987. ISBN 0-8078-1749-X.
- Priest, John Michael. "Stand To It And Give Them Hell": Gettysburg as the Soldiers Experienced It From Cemetery Ridge to Little Round Top, July 2, 1863. El Dorado Hills, California: Savas Beatie, 2014. ISBN 978-1-61121-324-9.
- Shultz, David and David Wieck. The Battle Between the Farm Lanes: Hancock Saves the Union Center, Gettysburg, July 2, 1863. Columbus, Ohio: Ironclad Publishing, Inc., 2006.
- Tucker, Philip Thomas. Barksdale's Charge: The True High Tide of the Confederacy at Gettysburg, July 2, 1863. Casemate Publishers, 2013. ISBN 978-1-61200-179-1.
- Tucker, Philip Thomas. Storming Little Round Top: The 15th Alabama and Their Fight for the High Ground, July 2, 1863. Conshohocken, Pennsylvania: Combined Books, 2001. ISBN 1-58097-060-5.

==== Battle of Gettysburg Third Day ====
- Hess, Earl J. Pickett's Charge – The Last Attack at Gettysburg. Chapel Hill, North Carolina: University of North Carolina Press, 2001. ISBN 0-8078-2648-0.
- Hessler, Jams A. and Wayne E. Motts. Pickett's Charge at Gettysburg: A Guide to the Most Famous Attack in American History. Savas Beatie, 2015. ISBN 978-1611212006.
- Priest, John Michael. Into the Fight: Pickett's Charge at Gettysburg. Shippensburg, Pennsylvania: White Mane Books, 1998.
- Shultz, David L. Double Canister at Ten Yards: The Federal Artillery and the Repulse of Pickett’s Charge, July 3, 1863. Savas Beatie, 2017. ISBN 978-1-61121-272-3.
- Stewart, George R. Pickett's Charge: A Microhistory of the Final Attack at Gettysburg, July 3, 1863. Boston, Massachusetts: 1959.
- Wert, Jeffry D. Gettysburg: Day Three. New York: Simon & Schuster, 2001. ISBN 0-684-85914-9.

==== Retreat from Gettysburg ====
- Brown, Kent Masterson. Retreat from Gettysburg: Lee, Logistics, and the Pennsylvania Campaign. Chapel Hill, North Carolina: University of North Carolina Press, 2005.
- Ryan, Thomas J. and Richard R. Shuas. Lee is Trapped and Must be Taken: Eleven Fateful Days after Gettysburg: July 4 to July 14, 1863. Savas Beatie, 2019. ISBN 978-1-61121-459-8.
- Schildt, John W. Roads from Gettysburg. Shippensburg, Pennsylvania: Burd Street Press, 1998. ISBN 1-57249-071-3.
- Wittenberg, Eric J. and J. David Petruzzi, and Michael F. Nugent. One Continuous Fight: The Retreat from Gettysburg and the Pursuit of Lee's Army of Northern Virginia, July 4th – 14th, 1863. Savas Beatie, 2008. ISBN 978-1-932714-43-2.

==== Parts of the Gettysburg Battlefield ====
- Adelman, Garry E. Little Round Top: A Detailed Tour Guide. Gettysburg, Pennsylvania: Thomas Publications, 2001.
- Adelman, Garry E. and Timothy H. Smith. Devil's Den: A History and Guide. Gettysburg, Pennsylvania: Thomas Publications, 1997.
- Adelman, Garry E. and Timothy H. Smith. The Myth of Little Round Top, Gettysburg, Pennsylvania. Gettysburg, Pennsylvania: Thomas Publications, 2003.
- Archer, John M. Culp's Hill at Gettysburg: The Mountain Trembled. Gettysburg, Pennsylvania: Thomas Publications, 2002.
- Christ, Elwood W. "Over a Wide, Hot, ... Crimson Plain": The Struggle for the Bliss Farm at Gettysburg. Baltimore, Maryland: Butternut and Blue, 1993.
- Jorgenson, Jay. Gettysburg's Bloody Wheatfield. Shippensburg, Pennsylvania: White Mane Books, 2002.
- Jorgenson, Jay. The Wheatfield at Gettysburg: A Walking Tour. Gettysburg, Pennsylvania: Thomas Publications, 2002.
- Pfanz, Harry W. Gettysburg: Culp's Hill and Cemetery Hill. Chapel Hill: University of North Carolina Press, 1993. ISBN 0-8078-2118-7.

==== Casualties and dead from Gettysburg ====
- Busey, John W. The Last Full Measure: Burials in the Soldiers' National Cemetery at Gettysburg. Hightstown, New Jersey: Lonstreet House, 1988.
- Busey, John W. These Honored Dead: The Union Casualties at Gettysburg. Hightstown, New Jersey: Longstreet House, 1996.
- Busey, Travis W. and John W. Busey. Union Casualties at Gettysburg: A Comprehensive Record. Jefferson, North Carolina: McFarland & Co., 2011.
- Coco, Gregory A. Gettysburg's Confederate Dead. Gettysburg, Pennsylvania: Thomas Publications, 2003.
- Coco, Gregory A. A Vast Sea of Misery: A History and Guide to the Union and Confederate Field Hospitals at Gettysburg, July 1 – November 20, 1863. Gettysburg, Pennsylvania: Thomas Publications, 1988.
- Dreese, Michael A. The Hospital on Seminary Ridge and the Battle of Gettysburg. Jefferson, North Carolina: McFarland & Company, Inc., 2002.
- Krick, Robert K. The Gettysburg Death Roster: The Confederate Dead at Gettysburg, 3rd Edition, Revised. Dayton, Ohio: Morningside Bookshop, 1993.
- Redd, Rea Andrew Altars to Amputations: From Gettysburg Churches to Battlefield Hospitals: A History and Walking Tour. Savas Beatie, 2020. ISBN 978-1-61121-508-3.

==== Unit histories in the Gettysburg Campaign ====
- Baumgartner, Richard. Buckeye Blood: Ohio at Gettysburg. Huntington, West Virginia: Blue Acorn Press, 2003.
- Benedict, George G. The Battle of Gettysburg and the Part Taken Therein by Vermont Troops. Burlington, Vermont: Free Press, 1867.
- Desjardin, Thomas A. Stand Fast Ye Boys from Maine: The 20th Maine and the Gettysburg Campaign. Gettysburg, Pennsylvania: Thomas Publications, 1995.
- Dreese, Michael A. The 151st Pennsylvania Volunteers at Gettysburg: Like Ripe Apples in a Storm. Jefferson, North Carolina: McFarland, 2002. ISBN 0-7864-0804-9.
- Gragg, Rod. Covered With Glory: The 26th North Carolina Infantry at the Battle of Gettysburg. New York: HarperCollins, 2000.
- Gregg, David M. The Second Cavalry Division of the Army of the Potomac in the Gettysburg Campaign. Philadelphia, Pennsylvania: published by author, 1907.
- Hamblen, Charles P. Connecticut Yankees at Gettysburg. Kent, Ohio: Kent State University Press, 1993.
- Harris, Samuel. The Michigan Brigade of Cavalry at the Battle of Gettysburg. Cass City, Michigan: Co. A 5th Michigan Cavalry, 1894.
- Herdegen, Lance J. Those Damned Black Hats!: The Iron Brigade in the Gettysburg Campaign. Savas Beatie, 2010.
- McLean Jr., James L. Cutler's Brigade at Gettysburg, Revised Second Edition. Baltimore, Maryland: Butternut and Blue, 1994.
- McNeily, J. S. Barksdale's Mississippi Brigade at Gettysburg: Most Magnificent Charge of the War. Gaithersburg, Mississippi: Olde Soldier Books, Inc., 1987.
- Michigan Monument Commission. Michigan at Gettysburg: July 1, 2, 3, 1863. Detroit, Michigan: Winn & Hammon, 1889.
- Mingus Sr., Scott and Brent Nosworthy. Louisiana Tigers in the Gettysburg Campaign, June–July 1863. Baton Rouge, Louisiana: Louisiana State University Press, 2009. ISBN 978-0-8071-3479-5.
- Murray, R. L. A Perfect Storm of Lead, George Sears Greene's New York Brigade in Defense of Culp's Hill. Wolcott, New York: Benedum Books, 2000. ISBN 0-9646261-2-8.
- New York Monuments Commission. New York at Gettysburg, three volumes. Albany, New York: J. B. Lyon Co., 1902.
- Nicholson, John P., ed. Pennsylvania at Gettysburg, two volumes. Harrisburg, Pennsylvania: W. S. Ray, 1904.
- Osborne, Steward R. Holding the Left at Gettysburg: The 20th New York State Militia on July 1, 1863. Hightstown, New Jersey: Longstreet House, 1990.
- Peladeau, Marius B., comp. Burnished Rows of Steel: Vermont's Role in the Battle of Gettysburg, July 1–3, 1863. Newport, Vermont: Vermont Civil War Enterprises, 2002.
- Penny, Morris M. and J. Gary Laine. Struggle for the Round Tops: Law's Alabama Brigade at the Battle of Gettysburg. Shippensburg, Pennsylvania: Burd Street Press, 1999.
- Root, Edwin R. and Jeffry D. Stocker. "Isn't This Glorious!": The 15th, 19th and 20th Massachusetts Volunteer Infantry Regiments at Gettysburg's Copse of Trees. Moon Trail Books, 2005.
- Speese, Andrew Jackson. Story of Companies H, A and C Third Pennsylvania Cavalry at Gettysburg July 3, 1863. Philadelphia, Pennsylvania: published by the author, 1907.
- Toombs, Samuel. New Jersey Troops in the Gettysburg Campaign, from June 5 to July 31, 1863. Orange, New Jersey: The Evening Hall Publishing House, 1888.

==== Atlases ====
- Editors of Stackpole Books. Gettysburg: The Story of the Battle with Maps. Mechanicsburg, PA: Stackpole Books, 2013. ISBN 978-0-8117-1218-7.
- Gottfried, Bradley M. The Maps of Gettysburg: An Atlas of the Gettysburg Campaign, June 3–13, 1863. New York: Savas Beatie, 2007. ISBN 978-1-932714-30-2.
- Laino, Philip. Gettysburg Campaign Atlas, 2nd ed. Dayton, Ohio: Gatehouse Press 2009. ISBN 978-1-934900-45-1.
- Symonds, Craig L. Gettysburg: A Battlefield Atlas. Baltimore, Maryland: The Nautical & Aviation Publishing Company of America, 1992. ISBN 1-877853-16-X.

== Battles and campaigns: Western Theater ==
- Augustus, Gerald L. The Battle of Campbell's Station: 16 November 1863. Cleveland, Tennessee: Cherohala Press, an imprint of CPT Press, 2013. ISBN 978-1-935931-36-2.
- Bearss, Edwin C. The Tupelo Campaign: June 22 - July 23, 1864: A Documented Narrative & Troop Movement Maps. Washington, D.C.: U.S. Department of the Interior, 1969.
- Beck, Brandon H. Streight's Foiled Raid on the Western & Atlantic Railroad: Emma Sansom's Courage and Nathan Bedford. The History Press, 2016. ISBN 9781626198623.
- Bennett, Stewart. The Battle of Brice’s Crossroads. Charleston, South Carolina: The History Press, 2012. ISBN 9781609495022.
- Bradley, George C. and Richard L. Dahlen. From Conquest to Conciliation: The Sack of Athens and the Court–Martial of Colonel John B. Turchin. Tuscaloosa, Alabama: University of Alabama Press, 2006.
- Bradley, Michael R. The Raiding Winter. Gretna, Louisiana: Pelican Publishing Co., 2013. ISBN 978-1-4556-1817-0.
- Bradley, Michael R. Tullahoma: The 1863 Campaign for the Control of Middle Tennessee. Shippensburg, Pennsylvania: Burd Street Press, 2000.
- Brewer, James D. The Raiders of 1862. Westport, Connecticut: Praeger Publishers, 1977. ISBN 0-275-95404-8
- Catton, Bruce, Grant Moves South. Little, Brown and Co., 1960. ISBN 0-316-13207-1.
- Chatelain, Neil P. Defending the Arteries of Rebellion: Confederate Naval Operations in the Mississippi River Valley, 1861-1865. Savas Beatie, 2020. ISBN 978-1-61121-510-6.
- Coombe, Jack D. Thunder Along the Mississippi: The River Battles that Split the Confederacy. New York: Sarpedon Publishers, 1996. ISBN 1-885119-25-9.
- Daniel, Larry J. and Lynn Bock. Island No. 10: Struggle for the Mississippi Valley. Tuscaloosa, Alabama: University of Alabama Press, 1996.
- Engle, Stephen D. The American Civil War: The war in the West 1861 – July 1863. Oxford, United Kingdom: Osprey Publishing, 2001. ISBN 1 84176 240 7.
- Engle, Stephen D. Struggle for the Heartland: The Campaigns from Fort Henry to Corinth. Bison Books, 2001. ISBN 978-0803267534.
- Force, M. F. From Fort Henry to Corinth. New York: Scribers, 1881.
- Foster, Buck T. Sherman's Mississippi Campaign. Tuscaloosa, AL: University of Alabama Press, 2006. ISBN 978-0-8173-1519-1.
- Hafendorfer, Kenneth A. The Battle of Wild Cat Mountain. Louisville, Kentucky: KH Press, 2003.
- Hartley, Chris J. Stoneman's Raid, 1865. John F. Blair, Publisher, 2010.
- Hess, Earl J. Banners to the Breeze: The Kentucky Campaign, Corinth, and Stones River. Lincoln, Nebraska: University of Nebraska Press, 2000.
- Hess, Earl J. The Civil War in the West: Victory and Defeat From the Appalachians to the Mississippi. Chapel Hill, North Carolina: University of North Carolina Press, 2012. ISBN 978-0-8078-3542-5
- Hess, Earl J. The Knoxville Campaign: Burnside and Longstreet in East Tennessee. Knoxville, Tennessee: University of Tennessee Press, 2013.
- Heweitt, Lawrence Lee. Port Hudson: Confederate Bastion on the Mississippi. Baton Rouge, Louisiana: Louisiana University Press, 1994.
- Hughes Jr., Nathaniel Cheaires. The Battle of Belmont: Grant Strikes South. Chapel Hill, North Carolina: University of North Carolina Press, 1991. ISBN 0-8078-1968-9.
- Hurst, Jack. Born to Battle: Grant and Forrest: Shiloh, Vicksburg, and Chattanooga: The Campaigns That Doomed the Confederacy. New York: Basic Books, 2012. ISBN 978-0-465-02018-8.
- Kolakowski, Christopher L. The Stones River and Tullahoma Campaigns: This Army does not Retreat. Charleston, South Carolina: The History Press, 2011.
- Lepa, Jack H. Breaking the Confederacy: The Georgia and Tennessee Campaigns of 1864. Jefferson, North Carolina: McFarland, 2005. ISBN 0-7864-2178-9.
- Lepa, Jack H. The Civil War in Tennessee, 1862-1863. McFarland & Company, 2007. ISBN 978-0786429783.
- Lepa, Jack H. Grant's River Campaign: Fort Henry to Shiloh. Jefferson, North Carolina: McFarland and Company, 2014. ISBN 978-0-7864-7477-6.
- McBryde, John. The Battle of West Point: Confederate Triumph at Ellis Bridge. Charleston, South Carolina: The History Press, 2013. ISBN 9781609499877.
- McDonough, James Lee. War in Kentucky: From Shiloh to Perryville. Knoxville, Tennessee: University of Tennessee Press, 1994. ISBN 0-87049-847-9.
- Mowrey, David L. Morgan's Great Raid: The Remarkable Expedition from Kentucky to Ohio. Charleston, South Carolina: The History Press, 2013. ISBN 978-1-60949-436-0.
- Parson, Thomas E. Work for Giants: The Campaign and Battle of Tupelo/Harrisburg, Mississippi, June–July 1864. Kent, Ohio: Kent State University Press, 2014. ISBN 978-1-60635-222-9.
- Penn, William A. Kentucky Rebel Town: The Civil War Battles of Cynthiana and Harrison County. University Press of Kentucky, 2016. ISBN 9780813167718.
- Powell, David A. and Eric J. Wittenberg. Tullahoma: The Forgotten Campaign that Changed the Course of the Civil War, June 23–July 4, 1863. El Dorado Hills, California: Savas Beatie, 2020. ISBN 978-1-61121-504-5.
- Sanders, Stuart W. The Battle of Mill Springs Kentucky. Charleston, South Carolina: The History Press, 2013. ISBN 978-1-60949-829-0.
- Savas, Theodore. A Series of Colossal Mistakes: Why Sherman's Failure to Destroy the Augusta Powder Works Prolonged the Civil War. Savas Beatie, 2020. ISBN 978-1-94066-990-8.
- Smith Jr., Myron J. The Fight for the Yazoo, August 1862–July 1864: Swamps, Forts and Fleets on Vicksburg’s Northern Flank. Jefferson, North Carolina: McFarland & Company, Inc., 2012. ISBN 978-0-7864-6281-0.
- Smith, Timothy B. Corinth 1862: Siege, Battle, Occupation. Lawrence, Kansas: University Press of Kansas, 2012. ISBN 9780700623457.
- Tomblin, Barbara Brooks. The Civil War on the Mississippi: Union Sailors, Gunboat Captains, and the Campaign to Control the River. University Press of Kentucky, 2016. ISBN 9780813167039.
- Wills, Brian Steel. The River was Dyed with Blood: Nathan Bedford Forrest & Fort Pillow. Norman, Oklahoma: University of Oklahoma Press, 2014. ISBN 978-0-8061-4453-5.
- Woodworth, Stephen E. Jefferson Davis and His Generals: The Failure of Confederate Command in the West. Lawrence, Kansas: University Press of Kansas, 1990. ISBN 0-7006-0461-8.
- Woodworth, Stephen E. Decision in the Heartland: The Civil War in the West. 2011.

=== Atlanta Campaign ===
- Bonds, Russell S. War Like the Thunderbolt: The Battle and Burning of Atlanta. Yardly, Pennsylvania: Westhome Publishing, 2009. ISBN 978-1-59416-127-8.
- Butkovich, Brad. The Battle of Allatoona Pass: Civil War Skirmish in Bartow County, Georgia. Charleston, South Carolina: The History Press, 2014. ISBN 9781626194618.
- Butkovich, Brad. The Battle of Pickett's Mill: Along the Dead-Line. Charleston, South Carolina: The History Press, 2013. ISBN 9781626190429.
- Cannan, John. The Atlanta Campaign: May - November 1864. Conshohocken, Pennsylvania: Combined Publishing, 1991.
- Carter III, Samuel. The Siege of Atlanta. New York: St. Martin's Press, 1973.
- Castel, Albert. Decision in the West: The Atlanta Campaign of 1864. Lawrence, Kansas: University Press of Kansas, 1992.
- Cox, Jacob D. Sherman's Battle for Atlanta. Cambridge, Massachusetts: Da Capo Press, 1994. ISBN 978-0-306-80588-2.
- Davis, Stephen. All the Fighting They Want: The Atlanta Campaign from Peachtree Creek to the Surrender, July 18-September 2, 1864. Savas Beatie, 2017. ISBN 978-1-61121-319-5.
- Davis, Stephen. Atlanta Will Fall: Sherman, Joe Johnston, and the Yankee Heavy Battalions. Wilmington, Delaware: SR Books, 2001. ISBN 0-8420-2788-2.
- Davis, Stephen. A Long and Bloody Task: The Atlanta Campaign from Dalton through Kennesaw to the Chattahoochee, May 5-July 18, 1864. Savas Beatie, 2016. ISBN 978-1-61121-317-1.
- Davis, Stephen. What the Yankees Did to Us: Sherman's Bombardment and Wrecking of Atlanta. Macon, Georgia: Mercer University Press, 2012. ISBN 978-0-88146-398-9.
- Ecelbarger, Gary. The Day Dixie Died: The Battle of Atlanta. New York: St. Martin's Press, 2010. ISBN 978-0-312-56399-8.
- Evans, David. Sherman's Horsemen: Union Cavalry Operations in the Atlanta Campaign. Bloomington, Indiana: Indiana University Press, 1996. ISBN 0-253-32963-9.
- Hess, Earl J. Fighting for Atlanta: Tactics, Terrain, and Trenches in the Civil War. Chapel Hill, North Carolina: University of North Carolina Press, 2018. ISBN 978-1-4696-4342-7.
- Hess, Earl J. July 22: The Civil War Battle of Atlanta. Lawrence, Kansas: University Press of Kansas, 2023. ISBN 9780700633968.
- Hess, Earl J. Kennesaw Mountain: Sherman, Johnston, and the Atlanta Campaign. Chapel Hill, North Carolina: University of North Carolina Press, 2013. ISBN 978-1-4696-0211-0.
- Hey, William. The Battle of Atlanta and the Georgia Campaign. New York: Twayne, 1958.
- Jenkins Sr., Robert D. The Battle of Peach Tree Creek: Hood's First Sortie, 20 July 1864. Macon, Georgia: Mercer University Press, 2014. ISBN 9780881463965.
- Kelly, Walden. Kennesaw Mountain and the Atlanta Campaign: A Tour Guide. Atlanta, Georgia: Susan Hunter Publications, 1990.
- Luvaas, Jay, and Harold W. Nelson, eds. Guide to the Atlanta Campaign: Rocky Face Ridge to Kennesaw Mountain. Lawrence, Kansas: University Press of Kansas, 2008. ISBN 978-0-7006-1570-4.
- McDonough, James Lee, and James Pickett Jones. War so Terrible: Sherman and Atlanta. New York: W. W. Norton & Co., 1987. ISBN 0-393-02497-0.
- McMurray, Richard M. Atlanta 1864: Last Chance for the Confederacy. Lincoln, Nebraska: Bison Books, 2001.
- McMurray, Richard M. The Road Past Kennesaw: The Atlanta Campaign of 1864. Washington, D.C.: National Park Service, 1972.
- Richardson, Eldon B. Kolb's Farm: Rehearsal for Atlanta's Doom. no publisher listed, 1979.
- Savas, Theodore P. and David A. Woodbury, eds. The Campaign for Atlanta and Sherman's March to the Sea, two volumes. Campbell, California: Savas Woodbury, 1994.
- Scaife, William R. The Campaign for Atlanta. Saline, Michigan: McNaughton & Gunn, 1993.
- Secrist, Philip L. The Battle of Resaca: Atlanta Campaign, 1864. Macon, Georgia: Mercer University Press, 2010.
- Secrist, Philip L. Sherman's 1864 Trail of Battle to Atlanta. Macon, Georgia: Mercer University Press, 2006. ISBN 978-0-86554-745-2.
- Vermilya, Daniel J. The Battle of Kennesaw Mountain. Charleston, South Carolina: The History Press, 2014. ISBN 978-1-62619-388-8.

=== Battle of Shiloh ===
- Cunningham, O. Edward. Shiloh and the Western Campaign of 1862. edited by Gary D. Joiner and Timothy B. Smith. New York: Savas Beatie, 2007. ISBN 978-1-932714-27-2.
- Daniel, Larry. Shiloh: The Battle that Changed the Civil War. New York: Simon and Schuster, 1997. ISBN 0-684-83857-5.
- Groom, Winston. Shiloh, 1862: The First Great and Terrible Battle of the Civil War. Washington, D.C.: National Geographic Society, 2011. ISBN 978-1-4262-0874-4.
- Hoburt, Edwin. The Truth About Shiloh. Springfield, Illinois: Illinois Register Publishing Company, 1909.
- Howard, Samuel A. The Illustrated Comprehensive History of the Great Battle of Shiloh. Kansas City: Franklin Hudson Publishing Company, 1921.
- Martin, David G. The Shiloh Campaign: March - April 1862, revised edition. Da Capo Press, 2007. ISBN 0-306-81259-2.
- McDonough, James Lee. Shiloh – in Hell before Night. Knoxville, Tennessee: University of Tennessee Press, 1977. ISBN 0-87049-199-7.
- Mertz, Gregory A. Attack at Daylight and Whip Them: The Battle of Shiloh, April 6–7, 1862. Savas Beatie, 2019. ISBN 978-1-61121-313-3.
- Nevin, David. The Road to Shiloh: Early Battles in the West. Alexandria, Virginia: Time–Life Books, 1983. ISBN 0-8094-4716-9.
- Reed, D. W. The Battle of Shiloh and the Organizations Engaged. Washington, D.C.: Government Printing Office, 1902.
- Smith, Timothy B. Shiloh: Conquer or Perish. Lawrence, Kansas: University Press of Kansas, 2016. ISBN 9780700623471.
- Sword, Wiley. Shiloh: Bloody April. Dayton, Ohio: Morningside Books, 1974. ISBN 0-89029-770-3.
- Woodworth, Steven E. The Shiloh Campaign. Carbondale, Illinois: Southern Illinois University Press, 2009. ISBN 978-0-8093-2892-5.
- Woodworth, Steven E. Shiloh: Confederate High Tide in the Heartland. Santa Barbara, California: Praeger, 2013. ISBN 978-0-313-39921-3.

=== Battle of Stones River ===
- Belcher, Dennis W. The Cavalries at Stones River: An Analytical History. Jefferson, North Carolina: McFarland & Company, 2017. ISBN 978-1-4766-6536-8.
- Cozzens, Peter. No Better Place to Die: The Battle of Stones River. Urbana, Illinois: University of Illinois Press, 1990. ISBN 0-252-01652-1.
- Daniel, Larry J. Battle of Stones River: The Forgotten Conflict Between the Confederate Army of Tennessee and the Union Army of the Cumberland. Baton Rouge: Louisiana State University Press, 2012. ISBN 978-0-8071-4516-6.
- McDonough, James Lee. Stones River – Bloody Winter in Tennessee. Knoxville, Tennessee: University of Tennessee Press, 1980. ISBN 0-87049-301-9.
- Stevenson, Alexander F. The Battle of Stone's River. Boston, Massachusetts: James R. Osgood, 1884.

=== Carolinas Campaign ===
- (no author) Cavalry Clash in the Sandhills: The Battle of Monroe's Crossroads, North Carolina, 10 March 1865. U.S. Dept. of the Interior, National Park Service, 1997.
- Bradley, Mark L. Last Stand in the Carolinas: The Battle of Bentonville. Campbell, California: Savas Publishing Co., 1995. ISBN 1-882810-02-3.
- Bradley, Mark L. This Astounding Close: The Road to Bennett Place. Chapel Hill, North Carolina: University of North Carolina Press, 2000. ISBN 0-8078-2565-4.
- Broadwater, Robert P. Battle of Despair: Bentonville and the North Carolina Campaign. Macon, Georgia: Mercer University Press, 2004. ISBN 978-0-86554-821-3.
- Campbell, Jacqueline Glass. When Sherman Marched North from the Sea: Resistance on the Confederate Home Front. Chapel Hill, North Carolina: University of North Carolina Press, 2003.
- Conrad, August. The Destruction of Columbia S.C. A Translation of the German by Wm. H. Pleasants. Roanoke, Virginia: Stone Printing and Manufacturing Company, 1902.
- Davis, Daniel T. and Phillip S. Greenwalt. Calamity in Carolina: The Battles of Averasboro and Bentonville, March 1865. El Dorado Hills, California: Savas Beatie, 2015. ISBN 978-1-61121-245-7.
- Dollar Jr., Ernest J. Hearts Torn Asunder: Trauma in the Civil War’s Final Campaign in North Carolina. Savas Beatie, 2020. ISBN 978-1-61121-512-0.
- Dunkerly, Robert M. The Confederate Surrender at Greensboro: Final Days of the Army of Tennessee, April 1865. Jefferson, North Carolina: McFarland & Company, Inc., 2013. ISBN 978-0-7864-7362-5.
- Fowler, Malcolm. The Battle of Averasboro. Raleigh, North Carolina: North Carolina Confederate Centennial Commission, 1965.
- Gibes, James G. Who Burnt Columbia?. Newberry, South Carolina: E.H. Auld Company, 1902.
- Hughes, Nathaniel Cheairs Jr. Bentonville: The Final Battle of Sherman and Johnston. Chapel Hill, North Carolina: University of North Carolina Press, 1996. ISBN 0-8078-2281-7.
- Lucas, Marion Brunson. Sherman and the Burning of Columbia. College Station, Texas: Texas A&M University Press, 1976.
- Moore, Mark A. Moore's Historical Guide to the Battle of Bentonville. New York: Da Capo Press, 2001. ISBN 1-882810-15-5.
- Sokolosky, Wade and Mark S. Smith. The Battle of Wise's Forks, March 1865. Savas Beatie, 2015. ISBN 978-1-61121-266-2.
- Smith, Mark A. and Wade Sokolosky. "No Such Army Since the Days of Julius Caesar": Sherman's Carolinas Campaign from Fayetteville to Averasboro. Ft. Mitchell, Kentucky: Ironclad Publishing, 2005. ISBN 0-9673770-6-4.
- Stokes, Karen. South Carolina Civilians in Sherman's Path: Stories of Courage and Civil War Destruction. Charleston, South Carolina: The History Press, 2013. ISBN 978-1-60949-704-0.
- Wittenburg, Eric J. The Battle of Monroe's Crossroads and the Civil War's Final Campaign. El Dorado Hills, California: Savas Beatie, LLC, 2006.

=== Chickamauga and Chattanooga campaigns ===
- (no author listed) The Battle of Chickamauga. Eastern Acorn Press, 1969.
- (no author listed) The Battles for Chattanooga. Eastern Acorn Press, 1989.
- Abbazia, Patrick. The Chickamauga Campaign, December 1862–November 1863. Gallery Books, 1988.
- Arnold, James R. Chickamauga 1863: The River of Death. United Kingdom: Osprey Publishing, 1992. ISBN 1-85532-263-3.
- Belcher, Dennis W. The Union Cavalry and the Chickamauga Campaign. Jefferson, North Carolina: McFarland & Company, 2018. ISBN 978-1-4766-7082-9.
- Belknap, Charles E. History of the Michigan Organizations at Chickamauga, Chattanooga, and Missionary Ridge, 1863. Robert Smith Printing Company, 1897.
- Bowers, John. Chickamauga & Chattanooga: The Battles that Doomed the Confederacy. New York: Sterling Publishing Co., 1993.
- Bowers, John. Chickamauga and Chattanooga: The Battles That Doomed the Confederacy. New York: HarperCollins Publishers, 1994. ISBN 0-06-016592-8.
- Cozzens, Peter. This Terrible Sound: The Battle of Chickamauga. Urbana, Illinois: University of Illinois Press, 1992. ISBN 978-0-252-01703-2.
- Cozzens, Peter. The Shipwreck of Their Hopes: The Battles for Chattanooga. Urbana, Illinois: University of Illinois Press, 1994. ISBN 0-252-01922-9.
- Downey, Fairfax. Storming the Confederacy: Chattanooga, 1863. New York: David McKay Co., 1960.
- Elder, Lee. That Bloody Hill: Hilliard's Legion at Chickamauga. Jefferson, North Carolina: McFarland & Company, Inc., 2018. ISBN 9781476669588.
- Gracie, Archibald. The Truth about Chickamauga. New York: Houghton Mifflin Co., 1911.
- Jones, Evans C. Gateway to the Confederacy: New Perspectives on the Chickamauga and Chattanooga Campaigns, 1862-1863. Baton Rouge, Louisiana: Louisiana State University Press, 2014. ISBN 9780807155097.
- Korn, Jerry, and the Editors of Time-Life Books. The Fight for Chattanooga: Chickamauga to Missionary Ridge. Alexandria, Virginia: Time–Life Books, 1985. ISBN 0-8094-4816-5.
- Luvaas, Jay. Chickamauga. South Mountain Press, 1991.
- McDonough, James Lee, Chattanooga: A Death Grip on the Confederacy. Knoxville, Tennessee: University of Tennessee Press, 1984. ISBN 0-87049-425-2.
- Mendoza, Alexander. Chickamauga 1863: Rebel Breakthrough. ABC-CLIO, Inc., 2013.
- Norwood, C.W. Chickamauga Campaigns and Chattanooga Battlefields. Chattanooga, Tennessee: Office of the Librarian of Congress in Washington, 1898.
- Powell, David A. All Hell Can't Stop Them: The Battles for Chattanooga-Missionary Ridge and Ringgold, November 24–27, 1863. Savas Beatie, 2019. ISBN 9781611214130.
- Powell, David A. Battle Above the Clouds: Lifting the Siege of Chattanooga and the Battle of Lookout Mountain, October 16 - November 24, 1863. Savas Beatie, 2017. ISBN 978-1-61121-377-5.
- Powell, David A. Failure in the Saddle: Nathan Bedford Forrest, Joseph Wheeler, and the Confederate Cavalry in the Chickamauga Campaign. New York: Savas Beatie, 2011.
- Powell, David A. The Chickamauga Campaign: A Mad, Irregular Battle: From the Crossing of the Tennessee River Through the Second Day, August 22-September 19, 1863. El Dorado Hills, California: Savas Beatie, 2014. ISBN 978-1-61121-174-0.
- Robertson, William Glenn. River of Death--The Chickamauga Campaign: Volume 1: The Fall of Chattanooga. Chapel Hill, North Carolina: University of North Carolina Press, 2018. ISBN 9781469643120.
- Sword, Wiley. Mountains Touched With Fire: Chattanooga Besieged, 1863. New York: St. Martin's Press, 1995. ISBN 0-312-15593-X.
- White, William L. Bushwhacking on a Grand Scale: The Battle of Chickamauga, September 18–20, 1863. Savas Beatie, LLC, 2013. ISBN 978-1-61121-158-0.
- Wittenberg, Eric. Holding the Line on the River of Death: Union Mounted Forces at Chickamauga, September 18, 1863. El Dorado Hills, California: Savas Beatie, 2018. ISBN 9781611214307.
- Woodworth, Stephen E. A Deep Steady Thunder: The Battle of Chickamauga. State House Press, 1998. ISBN 978-1-886661-10-3.
- Woodworth, Stephen E. Six Armies in Tennessee: The Chickamauga and Chattanooga Campaigns. Lincoln, Nebraska: University of Nebraska Press, 1998. ISBN 0-8032-9813-7.
- Woodworth, Stephen E. This Grand Spectacle: The Battle of Chattanooga. McWhiney Foundation Press, 1999. ISBN 9781893114043.

=== Fall of New Orleans ===
- Bielski, Mark F. A Mortal Blow to the Confederacy: The Fall of New Orleans, 1862. Savas Beatie, 2020. ISBN 978-1-61121-489-5.
- Pierson, Michael D. Mutiny at Fort Jackson: The Untold Story of the Fall of New Orleans. University of North Carolina Press, 2016. ISBN 978-1-4696-2911-7.

=== Forts Henry and Donelson ===
- Cooling, Benjamin F. Forts Henry and Donelson: The Key to the Confederate Heartland. Knoxville, Tennessee: University of Tennessee Press, 1987.
- Gott, Kendall D. Where the South Lost the War: An Analysis of the Fort Henry-Fort Donelson Campaign, February 1862. Mechanicsburg, Pennsylvania: Stackpole Books, 2003. ISBN 0-8117-0049-6.
- Knight, James R. The Battle of Fort Donelson: No Terms but Unconditional Surrender. The History Press, 2011. ISBN 9781609491291.
- Smith, Timothy B. Grant Invades Tennessee: The 1862 Battles for Forts Henry and Donelson. Lawrence, Kansas: University Press of Kansas, 2021. ISBN 9780700633166.
- Tucker, Spencer. Unconditional Surrender: The Capture of Forts Henry and Donelson. McWhiney Foundation Press, 2001.

=== Franklin–Nashville Campaign ===
- Bailey, Anne J. The Chessboard of War: Sherman and Hood in the Autumn Campaigns of 1864. Lincoln, NE: University of Nebraska Press, 2000. ISBN 978-0-8032-1273-2.
- Bank, Robert. The Battle of Franklin. New York: 1908.
- Belcher, Dennis W. The Cavalries in the Nashville Campaign. Jefferson, North Carolina: McFarland & Company, 2020. ISBN 978-1-4766-7599-2.
- Cox, Jacob D. The Battle of Franklin, Tennessee, November 30, 1864. New York: 1897.
- Crownover, Sims. The Battle of Franklin. Nashville, Tennessee: 1955.
- Groom, Winston. Shrouds of Glory: From Atlanta to Nashville: The Last Great Campaign of the Civil War. New York: Atlantic Monthly Press, 1995. ISBN 0-87113-591-4.
- Hay, Thomas Robson. Hood's Tennessee Campaign. Dayton, Ohio: Press of the Morningside Bookshop, 1976.
- Horn, Stanley F. The Decisive Battle of Nashville. 1956.
- Jacobson, Eric A., and Richard A. Rupp. For Cause & for Country: A Study of the Affair at Spring Hill and the Battle of Franklin. Franklin, TN: O'More Publishing, 2007. ISBN 0-9717444-4-0.
- Jewell, Carey C. Harvest of Death: A Detailed Account of the Army of Tennessee at the Battle of Franklin. Hicksville, New York: 1976.
- Knight, James R. The Battle of Franklin: When the Devil Had Full Possession of the Earth. Charleston, South Carolina: The History Press, 2009.
- Knight, James R. Hood's Tennessee Campaign: The Desperate Venture of a Desperate Man. Charleston, SC: The History Press, 2014. ISBN 978-1-62619-597-4.
- Lundberg, John R. The Finishing Stroke: Texans in the 1864 Tennessee Campaign. State House Press, 2003. ISBN 978-1-893114-34-0.
- McDonough, James Lee. Nashville: The Western Confederacy's Final Gamble. Knoxville, Tennessee: University of Tennessee Press, 2004. ISBN 1-57233-322-7.
- McDonough, James Lee and Thomas L. Connelly. Five Tragic Hours: The Battle of Franklin. Knoxville, Tennessee: University of Tennessee Press, 1983. ISBN 978-0-87049-396-6.
- Schofield, Levi T. The Retreat from Pulaski to Nashville. Cleveland, Ohio: 1909.
- Smith, Michael Thomas. The 1864 Franklin-Nashville Campaign: The Finishing Stroke. ABC-CLIO, Incorporated, 2014. ISBN 9780313392344.
- Sword, Wiley. The Confederacy's Last Hurrah: Spring Hill, Franklin, & Nashville. Lawrence, Kansas: University Press of Kansas, 1992. ISBN 0-7006-0650-5.
- White, William Lee. Let Us Die Like Men: The Battle of Franklin, November 30, 1864. Savas Beatie, 2019. ISBN 978-1-61121-296-9.

=== Iuka and Corinth Operations ===
- Cozzens, Peter. The Darkest Days of the War: The Battles of Iuka & Corinth. Chapel Hill, North Carolina: University of North Carolina Press, 1997. ISBN 0-8078-2320-1.
- Gentry, Claude. The Battle of Corinth. Baldwyn, Mississippi: 1976.
- Kitchens, Ben Earl. Rosecrans Meets Price: The Battle of Iuka, Mississippi. Florence, Alabama: 1987.
- McDaniel, Robert W. Battle of Davis Bridge. Boliver, Tennessee: no publisher, no date.

=== Meridian and Yazoo River Expeditions ===
- Beck, Brandon. The Battle of Okolona: Defending the Mississippi Prairie. Charleston, South Carolina: The History Press, 2009. ISBN 9781596297784.

=== Mobile Campaign ===
- Friend, Jack. West Wind, Flood Tide: The Battle of Mobile Bay. Naval Institute Press, 2004.
- Hearn, Chester G. Mobile Bay and the Mobile Campaign: The Last Great Battles of the Civil War. Jefferson, North Carolina: McFarland & Company, Inc., 1998. ISBN 0-7864-0574-0.
- O'Brien, Sean Michael. Mobile, 1865: Last Stand of the Confederacy. Praeger, 2001.
- Waugh, John C. and Grady McWhiney. Last Stand at Mobile. McWhiney Foundation Press, 2001.

=== Perryville campaign ===
- Broadwater, Robert P. The Battle of Perryville, 1862: Culmination of the Failed Kentucky Campaign. Jefferson, North Carolina: McFarland & Company, Inc., 2010. ISBN 978-0-7864-6080-9.
- Gillum, Jamie. The Battle of Perryville and the Sixteenth Tennessee Infantry Regiment: A Re–evaluation. CreateSpace, 2011. ISBN 978-1466345799.
- Hafendorfer, Kenneth A. Perryville: Battle for Kentucky. Louisville, Kentucky: K. H. Press, 1991. OCLC 24623062.
- Kolakowski, Christopher L. The Civil War at Perryville: Battling for the Bluegrass. Charleston, South Carolina: The History Press, 2009.
- Lambert, D. Warren. When the Ripe Pears Fell: The Battle of Richmond, Kentucky. Richmond, Kentucky: Madison County Historical Society, 1995.
- Noe, Kenneth W. Perryville: This Grand Havoc of Battle. Lexington, Kentucky: University Press of Kentucky, 2001. ISBN 978-0-8131-2209-0.
- Reid, Richard J. They Met at Perryville. Commercial Print. Co., 1987.
- Sanders, Stuart W. Maney's Confederate Brigade at the Battle of Perryville. Charleston, South Carolina: The History Press, 2014. ISBN 9781626192645.

=== Sherman's March to the Sea ===
- Bailey, Anne J. The Chessboard of War: Sherman and Hood in the Autumn Campaigns of 1864. Lincoln, Nebraska: University of Nebraska Press, 2000. ISBN 978-0-8032-1273-2.
- Bailey, Anne J. War and Ruin: William T. Sherman and the Savannah Campaign. Wilmington, Delaware: Scholarly Resources, 2003.
- Barrett, John G. Sherman's March Through the Carolinas. Chapel Hill, North Carolina: University of North Carolina Press, 1956.
- Cubbison, Douglas. A Pretty Rough Time and One of the Hardest Battles of the War: The Battle of Griswoldville. Saline, Michigan: McNaughton and Gunn for the Blue and Gray Education Society, 1997.
- Davis, Burke. Sherman's March: The First Full-Length Narrative of General William T. Sherman's Devastating March through Georgia and the Carolinas. New York: Random House, 1980.
- Frank, Lisa T. The Civilian War: Confederate Women and Union Soldiers During Sherman's March. Baton Rouge, Louisiana: Louisiana State University Press, 2015. ISBN 978-0-8071-5996-5.t
- Glatthaar, Joseph T. The March to the Sea and Beyond: Sherman's Troops in the Savannah and Carolinas Campaigns. New York: New York University Press, 1985.
- Jones, Charles Colcock. The Siege of Savannah in December 1864, and the Confederate Operations in Georgia and the Third Military District of South Carolina during General Sherman's March from Atlanta to the Sea. Albany, New York: Joel Munsell, 1874.
- Kennett, Lee. Marching Through Georgia: The Story of Soldiers and Civilians During Sherman's Campaign. New York: HarperCollins, 1995. ISBN 0-06-016815-3.
- Livingston, Gary. "Among the Best Men the South Could Boast": The Fall of Fort McAllister. Cooperstown, New York: Caisson Press, 1997.
- Livingston, Gary. Fields of Gray: The Battle of Griswoldville. Cooperstown, New York: Caisson Press, 1996.
- Miles, Jim. To the Sea: A History and Tour Guide of Sherman's March. Turner Publishing Company, 1999.
- Monszalek, John F. Sherman's March to the Sea. Abilene, Texas: McWhiney Foundation, 2005. ISBN 1-893114-16-3.
- Nevin, David. Shermans' March. Alexandria, Virginia: Time–Life Books, 1986.
- Scaife, William R. The March to the Sea. Atlanta, Georgia: McNaughton & Gunn, 1993.
- Smith, David. Sherman's March to the Sea 1864: Atlanta to Savannah. United Kingdom: Osprey Publishing Ltd., 2007. ISBN 978-1-84603-035-2.
- Trudeau, Noah Andre. Southern Storm: Sherman's March to the Sea. New York: Harper Perennial, 2009. ISBN 978-0-06-059868-6.
- Weintraub, Stanley. General Sherman's Christmas Present: Savannah 1864. New York: HarperCollins, 2009. ISBN 978-0-06-170298-3.
- Wells, Charles. The Battle of Griswoldville. Macon, Georgia: published by the author, 1961.
- Wheeler, Richard, ed. Sherman's March. New York: Thomas Y. Crowell, 1978.

=== Vicksburg Campaign ===
- Arnold, James R. Grant Wins the War: Decision at Vicksburg. New York: John Wiley & Sons, Inc., 1997. ISBN 978-0-471-15727-4.
- Ballard, Michael B. Grant at Vicksburg: The General and the Siege. Carbondale, IL: Southern Illinois University Press, 2013. ISBN 978-0-8093-3240-3.
- Ballard, Michael B., Vicksburg: The Campaign that Opened the Mississippi. Chapel Hill, North Carolina: University of North Carolina Press, 2004.
- Bearss, Edwin C. The Siege of Jackson, July 10–17, 1863. Baltimore, Maryland: Gateway Press, 1981.
- Bearss, Edwin C. The Vicksburg Campaign, three volumes. Dayton, Ohio: Morningside Press, 1991, ISBN 0-89029-308-2.
- Beck, Brandon H. Holly Springs: Van Dorn, the CSS Arkansas and the Raid That Saved Vicksburg. Charleston, South Carolina: The History Press, 2011. ISBN 9781609490492.
- Bokros, Dan. The Battle of Raymond: The Untold Turning Point of the Civil War. Lulu Press, 2008. ISBN 978-1-4357-0606-4.
- Carter III, Samuel. The Final Fortress: The Campaign for Vicksburg, 1862–1863 1980.
- Dougherty, Kevin J. The Campaigns for Vicksburg, 1862–63: Leadership Lessons. Savas Beatie, LLC, 2011. ISBN 978-1-61200-003-9.
- Fraser, Mary Ann. Vicksburg: The Battle That Won The Civil War. Macmillan, 1999.
- Grabau, Warren. Ninety-eight Days: A Geographer's View of the Vicksburg Campaign. Knoxville, Tennessee: University of Tennessee Press, 2000.
- Groom, Winston. Vicksburg 1863. New York: Alfred A. Knopf, 2009. ISBN 978-0-307-26425-1.
- Hess, Earl J. Storming Vicksburg: Grant, Pemberton, and the Battles of May 19–22, 1863. Chapel Hill, North Carolina: University of North Carolina Press, 2020. ISBN 978-1-4696-6017-2.
- Hoehling, A. A. Vicksburg: 47 Days of Siege. Englewood Cliffs, New Jersey: Prentice Hall, 1969.
- Korn, Jerry. War on the Mississippi: Grant's Vicksburg Campaign. Alexandria, Virginia: Time–Life Books, 1985. ISBN 0-8094-4744-4.
- Kountz, John S. Record of the Organizations Engaged in the Campaign, Siege, and Defense of Vicksburg. Knoxville, Tennessee: University of Tennessee Press, 2011. ISBN 978-1-57233-760-2.
- Lalicki, Tom. Grierson's Raid: A Daring Cavalry Strike Through the Heart of the Confederacy. Macmillan, 2004.
- Lardas, Mark. Grierson's Raid 1863. Oxford, United Kingdom: Osprey Publishing, 2010.
- McCluney Jr., Larry Allen. The Yazoo Pass Expedition: A Union Thrust into the Delta. The History Press, 2017. ISBN 9781625858399.
- Miers, Earl Schenck. The Web of Victory: Grant at Vicksburg. New York City, New York: Knopf, 1955.
- Miller, Donald L. Vicksburg: Grant's Campaign That Broke the Confederacy. New York: Simon & Schuster Paperbacks, 2020.
- Shea, William L. and Winschel, Terrence J. Vicksburg is the Key: The Struggle for the Mississippi River. University of Nebraska Press, 2003.
- Smith, Timothy B. Bayou Battles for Vicksburg: The Swamp and River Expeditions, January 1-April 30, 1863. Lawrence, Kansas: University Press of Kansas, 2023. ISBN 9780700635665.
- Smith, Timothy B. Champion Hill: Decisive Battle for Vicksburg. El Dorado Hills, California: Savas Beatie, LLC, 2004. ISBN 1-932714-00-6.
- Smith, Timothy B. Early Struggles for Vicksburg: The Mississippi Central Campaign and Chickasaw Bayou, October 25-December 31, 1862. Lawrence, Kansas: University Press of Kansas, 2022. ISBN 9780700633241.
- Smith, Timothy B. The Siege of Vicksburg: Climax of the Campaign to Open the Mississippi River, May 23-July 4, 1863. Lawrence, Kansas: University Press of Kansas, 2021. ISBN 9780700632251.
- Smith, Timothy B. The Union Assaults at Vicksburg: Grant Attacks Pemberton, May 17–22, 1863. Lawrence, Kansas: University Press of Kansas, 2020. ISBN 9780700629060.
- Thienel, Philip M. Seven Story Mountain: The Union Campaign at Vicksburg. Jefferson, North Carolina: McFarland & Co., Inc., 1995.
- Winschel, Terrence J. Triumph & Defeat: The Vicksburg Campaign. El Dorado Hills, California: Savas Beatie LLC, 2004. ISBN 1-932714-04-9.
- Winschel, Terrence J. Vicksburg: Fall of the Confederate Gibraltar. State House Press, 1999. ISBN 978-1-893114-00-5.
- Woodrick, Jim. The Civil War Siege of Jackson, Mississippi. The History Press, 2016. ISBN 9781626197299.
- Woodworth, Steven E., and Charles D. Grear. The Vicksburg Campaign, March 29–May 18, 1863. Carbondale, IL: Southern Illinois University Press, 2013. ISBN 978-0-8093-3269-4.

=== Wilson's Raid ===
- Blount Jr., Russell W. Wilson's Raid: The Final Blow to the Confederacy. The History Press, 2017. ISBN 9781467139038.
- Jones, James Pickett. Yankee Blitzkrieg: Wilson's Raid Through Alabama and Georgia. Athens, Georgia: University of Georgia Press, 1976. ISBN 0-8131-9004-5.
- Misulia, Charles A. Columbus, Georgia 1865: The Last True Battle of the Civil War. Tuscaloosa, Alabama: University of Alabama Press, 2010.

== Battles and campaigns: Trans-Mississippi ==
- Adamson, Hans Christian. Rebellion in Missouri, 1861: Nathaniel Lyon and His Army of the West. New York: Chilton Co., 1961.
- Akridge, Scott H., and Emmett E. Powers. A Severe and Bloody Fight: The Battle of Whitney's Lane and Military Occupation of White County Arkansas, May and June 1862. Searcy, Arkansas: White County Historical Museum, 1996.
- Barnickel, Linda. Milliken's Bend: A Civil War Battle in History and Memory: Baton Rouge, Louisiana: Louisiana State University Press, 2013.
- Beck, Paul N. Columns of Vengeance: Soldiers, Sioux, and the Punitive Expeditions, 1863–1864. Norman, Oklahoma: University of Oklahoma Press, 2013.
- Britton, Wiley. The Civil War on the Border, two volumes. New York: G. P. Putnam's, 1890–1891.
- Carley, Kenneth. The Dakota War of 1862: Minnesota's Other Civil War. Saint Paul, Minnesota: Minnesota Historical Society, 2001.
- Castel, Albert E. Civil War Kansas: Reaping the Whirlwind. Lawrence, KS: University Press of Kansas, 1997. Originally published Ithaca, NY: Cornell University Press, 1958. ISBN 978-0-7006-0872-0.
- Castel, Albert E. General Sterling Price and the Civil War in the West. Baton Rouge: Louisiana State University Press, 1993. ISBN 0-8071-1854-0.
- Christ, Mark K. Civil War Arkansas, 1863: The Battle for a State. Norman, Oklahoma: University of Oklahoma Press, 2010.
- Christ, Mark K., editor. The Die is Cast: Arkansas Goes to War, 1861. Little Rock, Arkansas: Bulter Center Books, 2010.
- Christ, Mark K., editor. The Earth Reeled and Trees Trembled: Civil War Arkansas, 1863–1864. Little Rock, Arkansas: Old State House Museum, 2007.
- Christgau, John. Birch Coulie: The Epic Battle of the Dakota War. Lincoln, Nebraska: University of Nebraska Press, 2012.
- Clampitt, Bradley R., editor. The Civil War and Reconstruction in the Indian Territory. Lincoln, Nebraska: University of Nebraska press, 2015. ISBN 978-0-8032-7727-4.
- Colton, Ray C. The Civil War in the Western Territories: Arizona, Colorado, New Mexico, and Utah. Norman, Oklahoma: University of Oklahoma Press, 1959.
- Cooper–Wiele, Jonathan. Skim Milk Yankees Fighting: The Battle of Athens, Missouri, August 5, 1861. Iowa City, Iowa: Camp Pope Bookshop, 2007.
- Cotham Jr., Edward T. Battle on the Bay: The Civil War Struggle for Galveston. Austin, Texas: University of Texas Press, 1998.
- Cotham Jr., Edward T. Sabine Pass: The Confederacy's Thermopylae. Austin, Texas: University of Texas Press, 2004.
- Cox, Dale. The Battle of Massard Prairie: The 1864 Confederate Attacks on Fort Smith, Arkansas. privately published, 2008.
- Cutrer, Thomas W. Empire of Sand: The Struggle for the Southwest, 1862. Abilene, Texas: State House Press, 2015.
- Cutrer, Thomas W. Theater of a Separate War: The Civil War West of the Mississippi River 1861–1865. Chapel Hill, North Carolina: University of North Carolina Press, 2017. ISBN 978-1-4696-3156-1.
- Dupree, Stephen A. Planting the Union Flag in Texas: The Campaigns of Major General Nathaniel P. Banks in the West. College Station, Texas: Texas A&M University Press, 2008.
- Earle, Jonathan, and Diane Mutti Burke. Bleeding Kansas, Bleeding Missouri: The Long Civil War on the Border. Topeka, Kansas: University Press of Kansas, 2014.
- Etcheson, Nicle. Bleeding Kansas: Contested Liberty in the Civil War Era. Topeka, Kansas: University Press of Kansas, 2004.
- Fellman, Michael. Inside War: The Guerilla Conflict in Missouri during the American Civil War. Oxford: Oxford University Press, 1990.
- Fischer, LeRoy H., ed. The Western Territories in the Civil War. Manhattan, Kansas: Sunflower University Press, 1977.
- Frazier, Donald S. Blood on the Bayou: Vicksburg, Port Hudson, and the Trans–Mississippi. Buffalo Gap, Texas: State House Press, 2015.
- Frazier, Donald S. Cottonclads!: The Battle of Galveston and the Defense of the Texas Coast. Abilene, Texas: McMurry University, 1996.
- Frazier, Donald S. Fire in the Cane Field: The Federal Invasion of Louisiana and Texas, January 1861 –January 1863. State House Press, 2010.
- Frazier, Donald S. Tempest Over Texas: The Fall and Winter Campaigns of 1863–1864. State House Press, 2023. ISBN 978-1-64967-018-2.
- Frazier, Donald S. Thunder across the Swamp: The Fight for the Lower Mississippi, February 1863–May 1863. Austin, Texas: State House Press, 2011.
- Gilmore, Donald L. Civil War on the Missouri-Kansas Border. Pelican, 2006.
- Gomer, Frederick W. Up from Arkansas: Marmaduke's First Missouri Raid Including the Battles of Springfield and Hartville. no publisher, 1999.
- Hatch, Thom. The Blue, the Gray, and the Red: Indian Campaigns of the Civil War. Harrisburg, Pennsylvania: Stackpole Books, 2003.
- Hess, Earl J., Richard W. Hatcher, III, William Garrett Piston, and William L. Shea. Wilson's Creek, Pea Ridge, and Prairie Grove: A Battlefield Guide with a Section on Wire Road. Lincoln, Nebraska: University of Nebraska Press, 2006.
- Hewitt, Lawrence Lee, with Arthur W. Bergeron Jr. and Thomas Schott, editors. Confederate Generals in the Trans–Mississippi: Essays on America's Civil War, two volumes. Knoxville, Tennessee: University of Tennessee Press, 2012–2015.
- Horn and Wallace, publishers, ed. Confederate Victories in the Southwest – Prelude to Defeat. Albuquerque, New Mexico: Horn and Wllace, 1961.
- Irby, James A. Backdoor at Bagdad: The Civil War on the Rio Grande. El Paso, Texas: Texas Western Press, 1977.
- Jones, Robert Huhn. The Civil War in the Northwest: Nebraska, Wisconsin, Iowa, Minnesota, and the Dakotas. Norman, Oklahoma: University of Oklahoma Press, 1960.
- Josephy Jr., Alvin M. The Civil War in the American West. New York: Alfred A. Knopf, 1992. ISBN 0-394-56482-0.
- Kerby, Robert L. Kirby Smith's Confederacy: The Trans–Mississippi South, 1863–1865. New York: Columbia University Press, 1972.. ISBN 0-231-03585-3.
- Lewis, Oscar. The War in the Far West: 1861–1865. New York: Doubleday, 1961.
- Lowe, Richard. The Texas Overland Expedition of 1863. Fort Worth, Texas: Ryan Place, 1996.
- Mayeux, Steven M. Earthen Walls, Iron Men: Fort DeRussy, Louisiana, and the Defense of the Red River. Knoxville, Tennessee: University of Tennessee Press, 2007.
- McLachlan, Sean. Ride Around Missouri: Shelby's Great Raid, 1863. Long Island City, New York: Osprey, 2011. ISBN 978-1-84908-429-1.
- Monaghan, Jay. Civil War on the Western Border. Boston, Massachusetts: Little, Brown, 1955.
- Oehler, C.M. The Great Sioux Uprising. New York: Oxford University Press, 1958.
- Pettis, George Henry. The California Column: Its Campaigns and Services in New Mexico, Arizona, and Texas during the Civil War. Santa Fe, New Mexico: Historical Society of New Mexico, 1908.
- Pierson, Michael D. Mutiny at Fort Jackson: The Untold Story of the Fall of New Orleans. Chapel Hill, North Carolina: University of North Carolina Press, 2008.
- Pittman, Walter. Rebels in the Rockies: Confederate Irregulars in the Western Territories. Jefferson, North Carolina: McFarland & Company, Inc., 2014. ISBN 978-0-7864-7820-0.
- Prushankin, Jeffrey S. The Civil War in the Trans–Mississippi Theater, 1861–1865. Washington, D.C.: Center of Military History, 2014.
- Prushankin, Jeffrey S. A Crisis in Confederate Command: Edmund Kirby Smith, Richard Taylor and the Army of the Trans–Mississippi. Baton Rouge, Louisiana: Louisiana State University Press, 2005. ISBN 0-8071-3088-5.
- Rampp, Larry C. and Donald Louis Rampp. The Civil War in the Indian Territory. Austin, Texas: Presidial Press, 1974.
- Raphael, Morris. The Battle in the Bayou Country. Detroit, Michigan: Harlo Press, 1975.
- Scharff, Virginia, editor. Empire and Liberty: The Civil War and the West. Berkeley, California: University of California Press, 2015.
- Schultz, Robert G. The March to the River: From the Battle of Pea Ridge to Helena, Spring 1862. Iowa City, Iowa: Camp Pope, 2014.
- Smith, David Paul. Frontier Defense in the Civil War: Texas' Rangers and Rebels. College Station, Texas: Texas A&M University Press, 1992. ISBN 0-89096-484-X.
- Spedale, William A. Fort Butler, 1863, Donaldsonville, Louisiana. Baton Rouge, Louisiana: no publisher listed, 1997.
- Thompson, Jerry D. and Lawrence T. Johns III. Civil War and Revolution on the Rio Grande Frontier: A Narrative and Photographic History. Austin, Texas: Texas State Historical Association, 2004.
- Townsend, Stephen A. The Yankee Invasion of Texas. College Station, Texas: Texas A&M University Press, 2006. ISBN 1-58544-487-1.
- Trafzer, Clifford E. The Kit Carson Campaign: The Last Great Navajo War. Norman, Oklahoma: University of Oklahoma Press, 1982.
- Van Nopper, Ina Woestemeyer. Stoneman's Last Raid. Raleigh, North Carolina: State College Print Shop, 1916.
- Warde, Mary Jane. When the Wolf Came: The Civil War and the Indian Territory. Fayetteville, Arkansas: University of Arkansas Press, 2013.
- Warren, Steven L. The Second Battle of Cabin Creek: Brilliant Victory. Charleston, South Carolina: The History Press, 2012. ISBN 978-1-60949-832-0.
- Wood, Larry. The Siege of Lexington Missouri: The Battle of the Hemp Bales. Charleston, SC: The History Press, 2014. ISBN 978-1-62619-536-3.
- Wood, Larry. The Two Civil War Battles of Newtonia. Charleston, South Carolina: The History Press, 2010.

=== Battle of Carthage ===
- Burchett, Kenneth E. The Battle of Carthage, Missouri: First Trans-Mississippi Conflict of the Civil War. Jefferson, North Carolina: McFarland & Company, Inc., 2013. ISBN 978-0-7864-6959-8.
- Cottrell, Steve. The Battle of Carthage and Carthage in the Civil War. Carthage, Missouri: City of Carthage, 1990.
- Hinze, David C. & Karen Farnham. The Battle of Carthage: Border War in Southwest Missouri, July 5, 1861. Gretna, Louisiana: Pelican Publishing Co., 2004. ISBN 978-1-58980-223-0. Originally published: Campbell, California: Savas Publishing Company, 1997. ISBN 1-882810-06-6.

=== Battle of Palmito Ranch ===
- Hunt, Jeffrey W. The Last Battle of the Civil War: Palmetto Ranch. Austin, Texas: University of Texas Press, 2002. ISBN 978-0-292-73461-6.
- Tucker, Phillip Thomas. The Final Fury: Palmito Ranch, the Last Battle of the Civil War. Mechanicsburg, Pennsylvania: Stackpole Books, 2001.

=== Battle of Pea Ridge ===
- Baxter, William. Pea Ridge and Prairie Grove; or, Scenes and Incidents of the War in Arkansas. Cincinnati, Ohio: Poe and Hitchcock, 1864.
- Brooks, Samuel Mathias. Indians at the Battle of Pea Ridge. Arkansas State Teachers College., 1961.
- Bockelman, Charles Arthur. Decision in Arkansas: The Battle of Pea Ridge. Baton Rouge, Louisiana: Louisiana State University Press, 1979.
- Burrow, Roy D. The Battle of Pea Ridge. Charleston, Illinois: 1970.
- Knight, James R. The Battle of Pea Ridge: The Civil War Fight for the Ozarks. Charleston, South Carolina: The History Press, 2012. ISBN 978-1-60949-447-6.
- Moody, Claire Norris. Battle of Pea Ridge: Or, Elkhorn Tavern. Arkansas Valley Printing Company, 1956 .
- Savas, Theodore P. The Battle of Pea Ridge: Union Victory in the West Casemate Publishing, 2001.
- Shea, William L, & Earl J. Hess. Pea Ridge: Civil War Campaign in the West. Chapel Hill, North Carolina: University of North Carolina Press, 1992. ISBN 0-8078-2042-3.
- Shea, William L. and Grady McWhiney. War in the West: Pea Ridge and Prairie Grove. McWhiney Foundation Press, 2012.

=== Battle of Wilson's Creek ===
- Bearss, Edwin C. The Battle of Wilson's Creek. Bozeman, Montana: 1985.
- Brooksher, William Riley. Bloody Hill: The Civil War Battle of Wilson's Creek. Brassy's, 1995. ISBN 1-57488-018-7.
- Patrick, Jeffrey L. Campaign for Wilson's Creek: The Fight for Missouri Begins. Buffalo Gap, Texas: McWhiney Foundation Press, 2011. ISBN 9781893114555.
- Piston, William Garnett & Richard W. Hatcher III. Wilson's Creek: The Second Battle of the Civil War and the Men Who Fought It. Chapel Hill, North Carolina: University of North Carolina Press, 2000. ISBN 0-8078-2515-8.
- Piston, William Garnett and Richard W. Hatcher III. Kansans at Wilson's Creek: Soldiers' Letters from the Campaign for Southwest Missouri. Springfield, Missouri: Wilson's Creek National Battlefield Foundation, 1993.
- Upton, Lucile Morris. Battle of Wilson's Creek. Wilson's Creek Battlefield Foundation, 1950.

=== Camden Expedition ===
- Bearss, Edwin c. Steele's Retreat from Camden and the Battle of Jenkin's Ferry. Little Rock, Arkansas: Eagle Press of Little Rock, 1966.
- Christ, Mark K. "All Cut to Pieces and Gone to Hell": The Civil War, Race Relations, and the Battle of Poison Spring. Little Rock, Arkansas: Butler Center for Arkansas Studies, 2003.
- Forsyth, Michael J. The Camden Expedition of 1864 and the Opportunity Lost by the Confederacy to Change the Civil War. Jefferson, North Carolina: McFarland & Company, Inc., 2008. ISBN 978-0-7864-3735-1.

=== New Mexico Campaign ===
- Alberts, Don. The Battle of Glorieta: Union Victory in the West. College Station, Texas: Texas A&M University Press, 1996. ISBN 0-89096-825-X.
- Cutrer, Thomas W. Empire of Sand: The Struggle for the Southwest,1862. State House Press, 2015. ISBN 978-1933337654.
- Edrington, Thomas. The Battle of Glorieta Pass: A Gettysburg in the West, March 26–28, 1862. Albuquerque, New Mexico: University of New Mexico Press, 1998. ISBN 0-8263-1896-7.
- Fitzpatrick, Charles and Conrad Cran. The Prudent Soldier, the Rash Old Fighter, and the Walking Wiskey Keg: The Battle of Val Verde, New Mexico, 13–21 February 1862. Fort Bliss, Texas: Air Defense Artillery School, 1984.
- Frazier, Donald S. Blood & Treasure: Confederate Empire in the Southwest. College Station, Texas: Texas A&M University Press, 1995. ISBN 0-89096-639-7.
- Hall, Martin H. Sibley's New Mexico Campaign. Austin, Texas: University of Texas Press, 1960.
- Kennedy, Elijay R. The Contest for California in 1861: How Colonel E. D. Baker Saved the Pacific States to the Union. Boston, Massachusetts: Houghton Mifflin, 1912.
- Kerby, Robert L. The Confederate Invasion of New Mexico and Arizona. Los Angeles, California: Westernlore Press, 1958.
- McKee, James C. Narrative of the Surrender of a Command of U.S. Forces at Fort Filmore, New Mexico in July A.D. 1861. Boston, Massachusetts: John A. Lowell, 1886.
- Taylor, John. Bloody Valverde: A Civil War Battle on the Rio Grande, February 21, 1862. Albuquerque: University of New Mexico Press, 1995. ISBN 0-8263-1632-8.
- Whitford, William Clarke. Colorado Volunteers in the Civil War: The New Mexico Campaign in 1862. Colorado State Historical and Natural History Society, 1960.
- Whitlock, Flint. Distant Bugles, Distant Drums: The Union Response to the Confederate Invasion of New Mexico. Boulder, Colorado: University Press of Colorado, 2006. ISBN 0-87081-835-X.

=== Prairie Grove Campaign ===
- Banaski, Michael E. Embattled Arkansas: The Prairie Grove Campaign of 1862. Wilmington, North Carolina: Broadfoot Publishing Company, 1996.
- Baxter, William. Pea Ridge and Prairie Grove; or, Scenes and Incidents of the War in Arkansas. Cincinnati, Ohio: Poe and Hitchcock, 1864.
- Montgomery, Don. The Battle of Prairie Grove. Prairie Grove, Arkansas: Prairie Grove Battlefield State Park, 1996.
- Shea, William L. Fields of Blood: The Prairie Grove Campaign. Chapel Hill, North Carolina: University of North Carolina Press, 2009. ISBN 978-0-8078-3315-5.
- Shea, William L. and Grady McWhiney. War in the West: Pea Ridge and Prairie Grove. McWhiney Foundation Press, 2012.

=== Price's Missouri Raid ===
- Buresh, Lumir F. October 25 and the Battle of Mine Creek. Kansas City, Missouri: The Lowell Press, 1977. ISBN 0-913504-40-8.
- Busch, Walter E. Fort Davidson and Battle of Pilot Knob: Missouri's Alamo. Charleston, South Carolina: The History Press, 2010.
- Crittenden, H.H. The Battle of Westport. Kansas City: 1934.
- Forsyth, Michael J. The Great Missouri Raid: Sterling Price and the Last Major Confederate Campaign in Northern Territory. Jefferson, North Carolina: McFarland & Company, 2015. ISBN 978-0-7864-7695-4.
- Hinton, Richard J. Rebel Invasion of Missouri and Kansas and the Campaign of the Army of the Border Against General Stirling Price in October and November 1864. Topeka, Kansas: Heritage Press, 1994.
- Jenkins, Paul B. The Battle of Westport. Kansas City, Missouri: Franklin Hudson Publishing Company, 1906.
- Kirkman, Paul. The Battle of Westport: Missouri's Great Confederate Raid. Charleston, South Carolina: The History Press, 2011.
- Lause, Mark A. The Collapse of Price's Raid: The Beginning of the End in Civil War Missouri. Columbia, Missouri: University of Missouri Press, 2014.
- Lause, Mark A. Price's Lost Campaign: The 1864 Invasion of Missouri. Columbia, Missouri: University of Missouri Press, 2011. ISBN 978-0-8262-1949-7.
- Lee, Fred L. The Battle of Westport, October 21–23, 1864. Westport Historical Society, 1996. ISBN 0-913504-38-6.
- Monnett, Howard N. Action Before Westport, 1864. Kansas City, Missouri: Westport Historical Society, 1995. ISBN 0-87081-413-3.
- Peterson, Cyrus A. and Joseph M. Hanson. Pilot Knob: the Thermopylae of the West. New York: Neale Publishing Company, 1914.
- Scheel, Gary L. Sixty–Six Miles in Thirty–Nine Hours: the Retreat from Fort Davidson, Pilot Knob to the Battle of Leasburg, September 28 thru October 1, 1864. No publisher, 2002.
- Sinisi, Kyle. The Last Hurrah: Sterling Price's Missouri Expedition of 1864. Lanham, Maryland: Rowman & Littlefield. 2015.
- Stalnaker, Jeffrey D. The Battle of Mine Creek: The Crushing End of the Missouri Campaign. Charleston, South Carolina: The History Press, 2011. ISBN 978-1-60949-332-5.
- Steele, James W. The Battle of The Blue of the Second Regiment, K.S.M., October 22, 1864; The Fight; The Captivity; The Escape. Topeka Kansas: 1895.
- Suderow, Bryce. A Thunder in Arcadia Valley: Price's Defeat, Sept. 27, 1864. Cape Girardeau, Missouri: Southeast Missouri State University, 1986.
- Suderow, Bryce A. and R. Scott House. The Battle of Pilot Knob: Thunder in Arcadia Valley. Cape Girardeau, MO: Southeast Missouri State University Press, 2014. ISBN 978-0-9903530-2-7.

=== Red River Campaign ===
- Anders, Curt. Disaster in Damp Sand: The Red River Expedition. Emmis Books, 1997.
- Ayres, Thomas. Dark and Bloody Ground: The Battle of Mansfield and the Forgotten Civil War in Louisiana. Dallas, Texas: Taylor Trade Pub., 2001. ISBN 9780878331802.
- Bergeron, Arthur. The Red River Campaign: Union and Confederate Leadership and the War in Louisiana. Parabellum Press, 2003.
- Brooksher, William Riley. War Along the Bayous: The 1864 Red River Campaign in Louisiana. Brassey's, 1998, ISBN 1-57488-139-6.
- Forsyth, Michael J. The Red River Campaign of 1864 and the Loss by the Confederacy of the Civil War. Jefferson, North Carolina: McFarland & Company, Inc., 2010. ISBN 978-0-7864-4499-1.
- Hamilton, James K. The Battle of Mansfield. University of Southwestern Louisiana, 1994
- Johnson, Ludwell H. Red River Campaign: Politics and Cotton in the Civil War. Baltimore, Maryland: Johns Hopkins Press, 1958. ISBN 0-87338-486-5.
- Joiner, Gary D. Little to Eat and Thin Mud to Drink: Letters, Diaries, and Memoirs from the Red River Campaigns, 1863–1864. Knoxville, Tennessee: University of Tennessee Press, 2007.
- Joiner, Gary Dillard. One Damn Blunder from Beginning to End: the Red River Campaign of 1864. Wilmington, Delaware: Scholarly Resources, 2002. ISBN 0-8420-2937-0.
- Joiner, Gary D. The Red River Campaign: The Union's Final Attempt to Invade Texas. Buffalo Gap, Texas: Stats House Press, 2013.
- Joiner, Gary D. Through the Howling Wilderness: The 1864 Red River Campaign And Union Failure in the West. Knoxville, Tennessee: University of Tennessee Press, 2006. ISBN 978-1-57233-544-8.
- Mitcham, Samuel W. Richard Taylor and the Red River Campaign Of 1864. Gretna, Louisiana: Pelican Publishing Company, Incorporated, 2012.
- Savas, Theodore P., ed. Red River Campaign: Essays on Union and Confederate Leadership. Casemate Pub., 1999.

== Battles and campaigns: Lower Seaboard Theater and Gulf Approach ==
- Blount Jr., Russell. The Longest Siege: Port Hudson, Louisiana, 1863. Jefferson, North Carolina: McFarland & Company, 2021. ISBN 978-1-4766-8411-6.
- Bostick, Douglas W. Charleston Under Siege: The Impregnable City. Charleston, South Carolina: The History Press, 2010.
- Brennan, Patrick. Secessionville: Assault on Charleston. Campbell, California: Savas Publishing Company, 1996. ISBN 1-882810-08-2.
- Broadwater, Robert P. The Battle of Olustee, 1864: The Final Union Attempt to Seize Florida. Jefferson, North Carolina: McFarland & Company, 2006. ISBN 978-0-7864-2541-9.
- Buker, George E. Blockaders, Refugees & Contrabands: Civil War on Florida's Gulf Coast, 1861–1865. Tuscaloosa, Alabama: University of Alabama Press, 1993.
- Burton, E. Milby. The Siege of Charleston 1861–1865. Columbia, South Carolina: University of South Carolina Press, 1970. ISBN 0-87249-345-8.
- Coker, Michael D. The Battle of Port Royal. Charleston, South Carolina: The History Press, 2009.
- Coles, David J. Men and Arms: Sketches of the Commanders and Units of the Olustee Campaign. Renaissance Printing, 1995
- Coombe, Jack D. Gunfire Around the Gulf: The Last Major Naval Campaign of the Civil War. New York: Bantam Books, 1999.
- Cotham Jr., Edward T. Battle on the Bay: The Civil War Struggle for Galveston. Austin, TX: University of Texas Press, 1998. ISBN 978-0-292-71205-8.
- Cotham Jr., Edward T. Sabine Pass: The Confederate Thermopylae. Austin, TX: University of Texas Press, 2004. ISBN 978-0-292-70594-4.
- Crawford, Samuel Wylie. The Genesis of the Civil War: The Story of Sumter, 1860–1861. New York: Charles L. Webster & Co., 1886.
- Crooks Jr., Daniel J. Lee in the Low Country: Defending Charleston and Savannah, 1861-1862.
- Cox, Dale. The Battle of Natural Bridge, Florida: The Confederate Defense of Tallahassee. Fort Smith, Arkansas: published by author, 2001. ISBN 978-0-6151-6386-4.
- Daugherty, Kevin. Strangling the Confederacy: Coastal Operations in the American Civil War. Casemate, 2010.
- Detzer, David. Allegiance: Fort Sumter, Charleston, and the Beginning of the Civil War. New York: Harcourt, 2001. ISBN 0-15-100641-5.
- Elmore, Tom. Potter's Raid through South Carolina: The Final Days of the Confederacy. The History Press, 2015. ISBN 9781626199590.
- Farley, Charlotte Corley. Florida's Alamo: The Battle of Marianna as 'Twas Told to Me. State Library of Florida, 1980.
- Hearn, Chester G. The Capture of New Orleans 1862. Baton Rouge, Louisiana: Louisiana State University Press, 1995. ISBN 0-8071-1945-8.
- Hendrickson, Robert. Sumter: The First Day of the Civil War. New York: Promontory Press, 1996. ISBN 0-88394-095-7.
- Hewitt, Lawrence Lee. Port Hudson: Confederate Bastion on the Mississippi. Baton Rouge, Louisiana: Louisiana State University Press, 1994.
- Johnson, John. The Defense of Charleston Harbor Including Fort Sumter and the Adjacent Islands. Charleston, South Carolina: Walker, Evans, and Cogswell, 1890.
- Klein, Maury. Days of Defiance: Sumter, Secession, and the Coming of the Civil War. New York: Alfred A. Knopf, 1997. ISBN 0-679-44747-4.
- Roberts, William H. Now for the Contest: Coastal and Naval Operations in the Civil War. Lincoln, Nebraska: University of Nebraska Press, 2004.
- Thigpen, Allen D. The Illustrated Recollections of Potter's Raid, April 5–12, 1865. Sumter, South Carolina: Gamecock City Printing, 1998.
- Vierow, Wendy. The Assault on Fort Wagner: Black Soldiers Make a Stand in South Carolina Battle. New York: The Rosen Publishing Group, 2004. ISBN 0-8239-6223-7.
- Wise, Stephen R. Gate of Hell: Campaign for Charleston Harbor, 1863. Columbia, South Carolina: University of South Carolina Press, 1994. ISBN 0-87249-985-5.

== Battles and Campaigns: Pacific Coast Theater ==
- Lewis, Oscar. The War in the Far West: 1861–1865. Garden City, New York: Doubleday & Company, Inc., 1961.
- Madsen, Brigham D. The Shoshoni Frontier and the Bear River Massacre. Provo, Utah: University of Utah Press, 1985.

== See also ==
- Bibliography of Ulysses S. Grant
