= 13th Missouri Cavalry Regiment =

Cavalry regiment of the Confederate States Army

13th Missouri Cavalry Regiment Wood's Missouri Cavalry Battalion 14th Missouri Cavalry Battalion
- Active: April 6, 1863 to June 8, 1865
- Allegiance: Confederate States of America
- Branch: Confederate States Army
- Type: Cavalry
- Engagements: American Civil War: Battle of Pine Bluff; Battle of Poison Spring; Price's Raid

The 13th Missouri Cavalry Regiment was a cavalry unit that served in the Confederate States Army during the American Civil War. In early April 1863, Captain Robert C. Wood, aide-de-camp to Confederate Major General Sterling Price, was detached to form an artillery unit from some of the men of Price's escort. Wood continued recruiting for the unit, which was armed with four Williams guns, and grew to 275 men by the end of September. The next month, the unit fought in the Battle of Pine Bluff, driving back Union Army troops into a barricaded defensive position, from which the Union soldiers could not be dislodged. By November, the unit, which was known as Wood's Missouri Cavalry Battalion, had grown to 400 men but no longer had the Williams guns. In April 1864, Wood's battalion, which was also known as the 14th Missouri Cavalry Battalion, played a minor role in the defeat of a Union foraging party in the Battle of Poison Spring, before spending the summer of 1864 at Princeton, Arkansas. In September, the unit joined Price's Raid into the state of Missouri, but their assault during the Battle of Pilot Knob failed to capture Fort Davidson.

Wood's battalion fought at the Battle of Little Blue River on October 21 after having participated in some further fighting and operationed against railroads. Two days later, Price's army was defeated at the Battle of Westport, and began retreating through the state of Kansas. During the retreat, on October 25, Wood's battalion was part of the Confederate line when it was shattered at the Battle of Mine Creek. During that action, the unit suffered 72 casualties, 50 of them as prisoners of war and the rest as killed and wounded. It then accompanied Price's army to Laynesport, Arkansas, via the Indian Territory and Texas. At an unknown date, it was enlarged to regimental strength and renamed the 13th Missouri Cavalry Regiment. After Price's Raid, the unit spent the rest of the war serving outpost duty in Arkansas. The Confederate commander of the Trans-Mississippi Department surrendered on June 2, 1865, and the men of the 13th Missouri Cavalry Regiment were paroled six days later. Around 670 men served in the unit over the course of its existence, at least 67 of whom died during that time.

== Background and formation ==
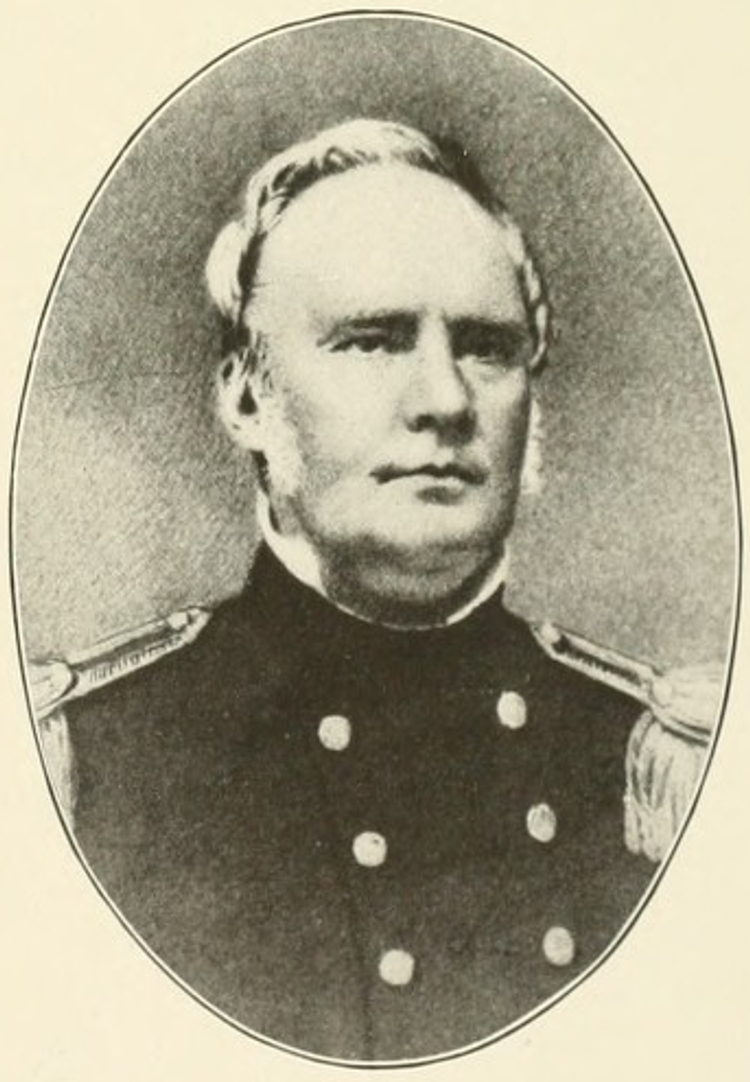
Major General Sterling Price. The unit was frequently under Price's command.

At the outset of the American Civil War in April 1861, Missouri was a slave state. Governor Claiborne Fox Jackson supported secession from the United States, and activated the pro-secession state militia who were sent to the vicinity of St. Louis, Missouri before being dispersed by Union troops in the Camp Jackson affair on May 10. In response, Jackson formed a secessionist militia unit known as the Missouri State Guard; he placed Major General (Note: State militia rank.) Sterling Price in command on May 12. In July, anti-secession state legislators held a vote rejecting secession, while Jackson and the pro-secession legislators voted to secede in November, joining the Confederate States of America and functioning as a government in exile. Militarily, the pro-secession forces won some early victories, but had lost most of their gains by the end of 1861. Price abandoned Missouri in February 1862, and a Confederate defeat at the Battle of Pea Ridge the next month gave the Union control of Missouri. By July 1862, most of the men of the Missouri State Guard had left to join units of the Confederate States Army. Missouri was then plagued by guerrilla warfare throughout 1862 and 1863.

Owing to a shortage of weapons controlled by the Confederate States War Department during the early stages of the war, units formed in the Trans-Mississippi Theater had to be armed by the states. An 1862 Confederate law required recruits to provide their own weapons (muskets, shotguns, rifles, or carbines). Some of the weapons used by Confederate cavalrymen in the Trans-Mississippi were privately produced in Texas. Many weapons were captured from Union forces and then put to use, and 25,000 firearms were ordered to be sent from east of the Mississippi in late 1862 (although only 3,000 were reported as received). Confederate cavalry operating in Arkansas were sometimes expected to produce their own ammunition. Overall, Confederate cavalry in the Trans-Mississippi was often armed with Bowie knives, shotguns, hunting knives, and muskets using the percussion cap system. The use of six-shooters was also popular, while the regulation sabers were not. The shotguns in particular were inferior to carbines.

Confederate cavalry in the Trans-Mississippi had an easier time procuring horses. In 1860, the states of Missouri, Arkansas, Louisiana, and Texas contained more horses than white men of military age. An 1861 Confederate law required cavalry volunteers to provide their own horse; many men in the Trans-Mississippi simply brought their own. Donation, purchase, and breaking wild horses were also sources of cavalry mounts. The turnover in horses was very heavy, many dying or becoming worn out due to enemy fire, disease, starvation, and heavy use. Confederate law required cavalrymen to replace their horses when they were killed or rendered unusable, and reimbursement was only provided if the death occurred in combat. This led to widespread theft and forced purchases of horses in 1863 and 1864, although such depredations were officially forbidden. For Trans-Mississippi Confederates, horses were generally much easier to acquire than weapons, food, or clothing.

During the American Civil War, cavalry was most commonly used to perform reconnaissance, operating against enemy communications, and screening movements from enemy observation. When mounted, cavalry forces generally avoided direct fights with infantry, and in pitched battles, the men generally fought dismounted with detachments of the units serving as horse holders. In the Trans-Mississippi, Confederate cavalry was used heavily for raiding purposes after the Battle of Prairie Grove.

=== Formation ===
On April 1, 1863, Price was sent to Little Rock, Arkansas to command a division. Five days later, Price's aide-de-camp, Captain Robert C. Wood, and 16 men of the general's escort were transferred to form a new artillery unit. By May 9, the unit had grown to 26 men manning four Williams guns and was under the authority of Brigadier General John S. Marmaduke. The Williams guns were powered by hand cranks, and fired 1 pound (0.45 kg) projectiles at a rate of 18 or 20 per minute. They are sometimes considered to be early machine guns. Wood was authorized to recruit cavalrymen by the Confederate District of Arkansas on June 12. According to Union estimates made in August in Fulton County, Arkansas, Wood had collected about 150 men and still had the four cannons, which were described by the Unionists as "flying artillery". The Williams guns were most likely manned by men in Captain William Woodson's company of the formation. No evidence exists that suggests the pieces were ever used in battle.

== Service history ==
=== Pine Bluff and Poison Spring ===
Map of Arkansas, showing several locations of importance during the war

On September 28, Wood and the 275 men he had recruited by then were ordered to move from their camp at Arkadelphia, Arkansas, to join Marmaduke's command. This order was rescinded because the unit, which was organized into a six-company battalion, was considered by Wood to be too poorly disciplined to be an effective combat unit. Earlier that month, Union forces commanded by Major General Frederick Steele had taken Little Rock; this success was followed by the occupation of several points along the Arkansas River. One of these outposts was at Pine Bluff, which was defended by 550 Union cavalrymen and 300 freed slaves commanded by Colonel Powell Clayton. Marmaduke decided to lead an attack against the post, which occurred on October 25. Wood's battalion took part in this action, which was known as the Battle of Pine Bluff. The Confederate force was advancing from the east, and Marmaduke drew up a plan of attack that involved dividing his force. Wood's battalion was part of the detached force, which used side roads to attack from the southeast.

The detached force followed this path of approach, and Wood's battalion and most of the rest of the column dismounted after reaching a brickyard 0.5 miles (0.8 km) from the town. The still-mounted portion of the Confederate force attacked down a road, scattering Union pickets. Wood's battalion was ordered to support this advance, which occurred around 09:00. After hearing a cannon shot used as a signal, the Missourians attacked down the road, but were stopped at the outskirts of Pine Bluff. The unit was then reinforced by Texans under the command of Major B. D. Chenoweth and Pratt's Texas Battery. After some sharpshooting, the Union defenders were driven further into the town. This was followed by another Confederate attack through the streets, until the Union troops reached a barricade made of cotton bales. Wood's men used a lull in the fighting to create their own cotton bale defenses. The Union defenders bolstered the strength of their cotton bale line with nine artillery pieces, and the Confederates were unable to take the position, despite launching several attacks and attempting to burn down the courthouse. The unit is reported to have suffered two casualties at Pine Bluff.

A strength report issued in October 1863 stated that the battalion had a strength of 219 men and 222 horses. At some point after November 1, Wood's battalion was augmented by two companies that had been recruited by James T. Cearnal during Shelby's Raid. The unit issued a strength report on November 10, which stated that it consisted of 400 men in 8 companies. The report did not mention any artillery component; what happened to the four cannons previously associated with it is not known. Documents dated as late as October 27 refer to the artillery component, those from November 3 and later do not. The Williams guns may have been sent to a different unit in November. Throughout the rest of 1863, Wood's battalion served as an independent unit under Marmaduke's command; it spent the early portion of the next year associated with Price's headquarters.

In March 1864, Steele was sent from Little Rock with 8,500 men to thrust into southwestern Arkansas in support of the Union Red River campaign, which was targeting Shreveport, Louisiana. Opposing Steele were 7,500 Confederates commanded by Price, including Wood's battalion. On April 15, Steele took the town of Camden, Arkansas, but had trouble securing enough food for his army. After the capture of Camden, Wood's battalion began fighting a series of small actions against parties sent out from the main Union position. One such party was sent out on April 17 to gather supplies. The next day, the Confederates moved to attack it, resulting in the Battle of Poison Spring. Shortly before the battle opened, Wood's battalion, by this point known as the 14th Missouri Cavalry Battalion, arrived on the field, having been sent by Price to reinforce Marmaduke, who was exercising command despite not being the most senior Confederate officer on the field. The Confederates then attacked the column, which included a sizable wagon train. Despite attempting to put up a defense, the Union line was quickly broken. Wood's unit was deployed briefly after the line broke, but was soon disengaged to prepare wagons captured during the fighting to be moved. After the fighting ended, some captured African American soldiers were massacred; postmortem mutilations were also inflicted on some of the Union dead.

In Louisiana, the Red River campaign had been repulsed, enabling the Confederates to focus on Steele. Isolated and running low on food, the Union troops abandoned Camden on April 26, and were harried by pursuing Confederates during their retreat. The 14th Missouri Cavalry Battalion participated in skirmishing during the pursuit. When Steele's column reached the crossing of the Saline River, they were caught by the Confederate pursuers, who launched several futile attacks on April 30, in the Battle of Jenkins' Ferry. The Union soldiers were able to escape across a pontoon bridge and eventually reached Little Rock. The 14th Missouri Cavalry Battalion had been held out of the Jenkins' Ferry fighting as a reserve unit. It then spent mid-1864 defending an outpost at Princeton, Arkansas.

=== Price's Raid ===
==== St. Louis and Jefferson City ====
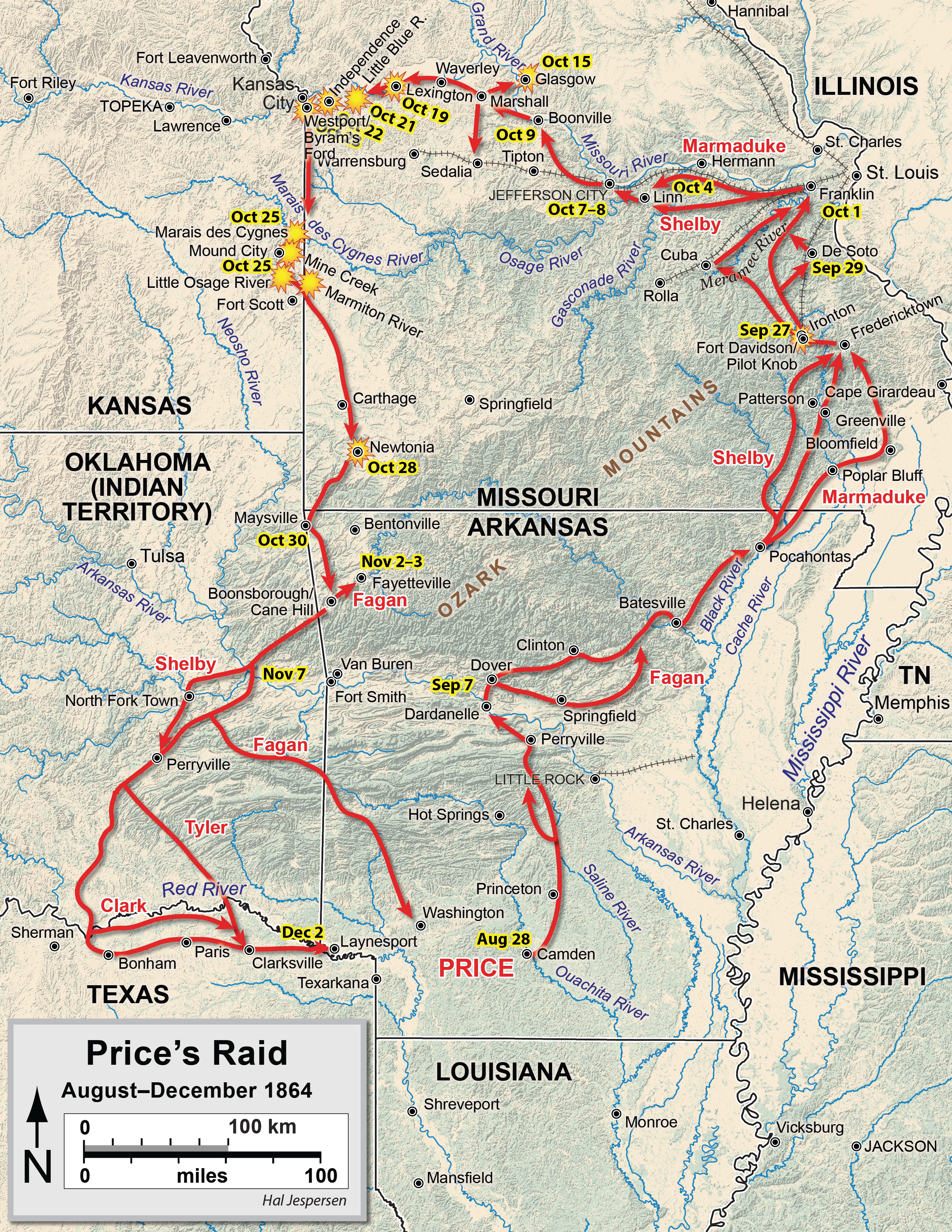
Map of Price's Raid, which took place in 1864. The red lines denote Confederate movements, the black circles are cities, and the yellow stars mark the sites of major battles.

In the 1864 United States presidential election, incumbent president Abraham Lincoln supported continuing the war, while former Union general George B. McClellan promoted ending it. By the beginning of September 1864, events in the eastern United States, especially the Confederate defeat in the Atlanta campaign, gave Lincoln an edge in the election over McClellan. At this point, the Confederacy had very little chance of victory. Meanwhile, in the Trans-Mississippi Theater, the Confederates had defeated a Union expedition during the Red River campaign from March through May. As events east of the Mississippi River turned against the Confederates, General Edmund Kirby Smith, commander of the Confederate Trans-Mississippi Department, was ordered to transfer the infantry under his command to the fighting in the Eastern and Western Theaters. This proved to be impossible, as the Union Navy controlled the Mississippi River, preventing a large-scale crossing. Despite having limited resources for an offensive, Smith decided that an attack designed to divert Union troops from the principal theaters of combat would have the same effect as the proposed transfer of troops. Price and the new Confederate Governor of Missouri, Thomas Caute Reynolds, (Note: Jackson had died in early December 1862 of stomach cancer; Reynolds replaced him in office on February 14, 1863.) suggested that an invasion into Missouri would be an effective operation; Smith approved the plan and appointed Price to command it. Price expected that the offensive would create a popular uprising against Union control of Missouri, divert Union troops away from principal theaters of combat, (Note: Many of the Union troops defending Missouri had been transferred out of the state, leaving the Missouri State Militia as the state's primary defensive force.) and aid McClellan's chance of defeating Lincoln. On September 19, Price's column of cavalrymen entered the state. When Price organized his army, Wood's battalion was attached to Marmaduke's division.

After entering the state, Price learned of a Union force holding Fort Davidson and the town of Pilot Knob. Price believed that his army could subdue the garrison, and sent Brigadier General Joseph O. Shelby's division north of the area to operate against a railroad, while Marmaduke's and Major General James F. Fagan's divisions moved against Fort Davidson. On September 27, the Confederates attacked the Union soldiers, who had taken up positions within the fort. During the ensuing Battle of Pilot Knob, Wood's battalion served with Brigadier General John B. Clark Jr.'s brigade, which attacked down from Shepherd Mountain against the fort. The battalion was part of Clark's right wing, along with the 3rd and 10th Missouri Cavalry Regiments and was the second unit from the right. When the attack against Fort Davidson occurred, these three units separated from the rest of Clark's brigade and fought alongside Brigadier General William L. Cabell's brigade. Despite taking heavy losses, Cabell's men and the attached units of Clark's command crossed a dry creek bed and were able to reach the fort's moat; the rest of Clark's brigade did not pass the creek bed. The Confederate attack was unable to reach the fort, whose defenders were protected from much of the Confederate fire by sandbags. After the attack fizzled out, the men of Clark's brigade fell back to the creek bed, although Cabell's men made another unsuccessful attack. Wood's battalion had suffered about 30 casualties during the fighting. The Union defenders abandoned the fort that night, and Wood's battalion was part of a force that pursued them.

Wood's battalion and the 4th Missouri Cavalry Regiment traveled to Cuba, Missouri, on September 30, where they destroyed part of the railroad and burned a depot. Also on the 30th, parts of the unit skirmished with Union militia at the bridge near Moselle. The unit later rejoined Clark's main body, with which it burned a bridge over the Meramec River. Meanwhile, Price had decided against attempting to take St. Louis, and began to head westwards towards Jefferson City. Wood's battalion was intended to travel to Jefferson City by train after boarding in the area of Hermann, but the railroad tracks were impassable. As a result, Wood's men burned the train and traveled mounted. They also burned a bridge over the Gasconade River. Price eventually decided that Jefferson City was too strongly defended to be taken, so the Confederates instead continued their movement west. Wood's battalion moved on a route that bypassed Jefferson City and reached Marshall via California, Missouri. Four companies of recruits were assigned to Wood's battalion while the unit was at Marshall, although they served separately during the campaign.

==== Movement west ====
As the Confederates moved west, they began to meet more Union resistance. Union Major General James G. Blunt fought a delaying action in the Second Battle of Lexington on October 19, but his force was brushed aside. Clark's brigade saw some action during the fighting at Lexington. Blunt's retreating men left a rear guard to hold the crossing of the Little Blue River. The Confederates attacked this holding force on October 21, bringing on the Battle of Little Blue River. Elements of Clark's brigade had crossed the river and were fighting against the rear guard when Blunt arrived on the field with reinforcements, pressuring the Confederates. Wood's battalion crossed the river, dismounted, and took up a position in an orchard to support the right side of the wavering Confederate line. Eventually, the weight of Union numbers forced the Confederates back towards the river, but Clark's men were reinforced, stabilizing the situation. The Confederates were eventually able to bring enough reinforcements across the river to successfully attack and defeat the Union line. Blunt's men fell back to Independence, Missouri. Wood's horse was killed during the fighting.

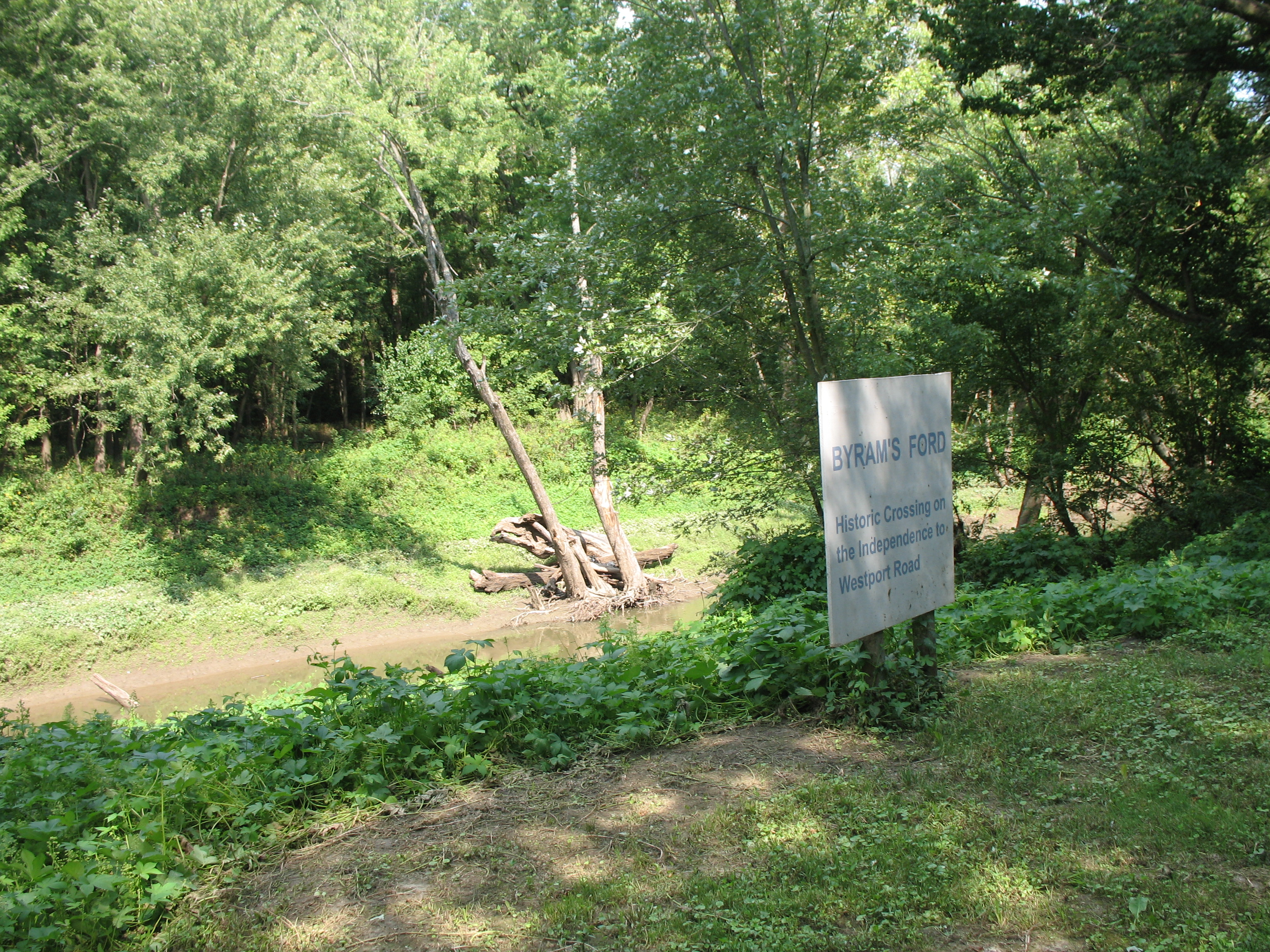
Modern photograph of the crossing site at Byram's Ford

By the morning of October 22, the Union troops had fallen back to a line along the Big Blue River. The Union line was under the command of Major General Samuel R. Curtis and contained many units of the Kansas State Militia. The Confederates occupied Independence. While Confederate forces broke through the line at the Big Blue River during the opening stages of the Battle of Byram's Ford on October 22, Union cavalry commanded by Major General Alfred Pleasonton, who had been pursuing Price's army from the east, caught up to the Confederates at Independence, resulting in the Second Battle of Independence. Pleasonton's men forced Cabell's brigade back through Independence, capturing several prisoners. While Clark's brigade, including Wood's battalion, managed to slow the Union pursuit, Pleasonton continued fighting into the night, which was uncommon during the American Civil War. The 3rd Iowa Cavalry Regiment drove the Confederates back, and almost all of Clark's brigade fell back across the Big Blue River that night.

The next day, the Battle of Byram's Ford resumed as Pleasonton's men attacked the Confederate position at the Big Blue River. Union cavalrymen drove the Confederate front lines back from the river towards a height known as Potato Hill, where Clark's brigade was aligned. At around 11:00, Union soldiers armed with repeating rifles attacked Potato Hill and drove off the Confederates, most of whom retreated before the fighting reached close quarters. Marmaduke's division eventually escaped from the Union pursuit and fell back to the south. Simultaneously with the fighting at Byram's Ford on October 23, the rest of Price's army was defeated at the Battle of Westport. The Confederates began retreating and entered the state of Kansas.

==== Retreat ====
On October 25, Price's column paused at the crossing of Mine Creek, in Linn County, Kansas, as the Confederates' wagon train attempted to cross the ford of the river. While the crossing was taking place, 2,600 Union cavalrymen led by Lieutenant Colonel Frederick W. Benteen and Colonel John F. Philips caught up to the Confederates, who formed a line between the Union soldiers and Mine Creek. Clark's brigade was on the Confederate right flank. Benteen and Philips' men attacked; Wood's battalion was in the front rank of the Confederate line and was second from the right when the attack hit. During the fighting, which became known as the Battle of Mine Creek, the Union soldiers quickly shattered the Confederate line. The Confederates's single-shot weapons were at a disadvantage against the repeating rifles the Union soldiers carried. About 600 Confederate soldiers, including Marmaduke, were captured. Fifty of the prisoners were from Wood's battalion, which lost a total of 72 men killed, wounded, or captured at Mine Creek. After Mine Creek, Wood's battalion retreated with the rest of Price's army through the Indian Territory into Texas, with an eventual destination of Laynesport, Arkansas. Complete casualty figures for the battalion over the course of the campaign are unknown. While one member of the unit stated that it lost almost 350 of the 400 men in the unit, the historian James McGhee rejects this claim as exaggerated.

At an unknown date, probably while the unit was in Texas or Arkansas, the four companies that had been attached to the battalion during the campaign and the eight existing companies were consolidated down into ten companies. Although the number of companies was reduced, there was an increase in manpower and it was designated a regiment, the 13th Missouri Cavalry Regiment. The ten companies were designated with the letters A–I and K and were composed of Missourians. Wood became the regiment's colonel, Richard J. Wickersham the lieutenant colonel, and William T. Payne was its major. The men of the unit spent the rest of the war performing outpost duty in Arkansas. Smith surrendered the Trans-Mississippi Department on June 2, 1865, and the men of the 13th Missouri Cavalry Regiment were paroled at Shreveport on June 8. The National Park Service states that the unit may have been disbanded in May 1865. Muster rolls indicate that about 670 men served in the regiment over the course of its existence, and at least 67 of them died during their military service.

== Sources ==
- Bearss, Edwin C. (Winter 1964). "Marmaduke Attacks Pine Bluff". The Arkansas Historical Quarterly. 23 (4). Arkansas Historical Association: 291–313. doi:10.2307/40030666. ISSN 0004-1823. JSTOR 40030666.
- Collins, Charles D. Jr. (2016). Battlefield Atlas of Price's Missouri Expedition of 1864 (PDF). Fort Leavenworth, Kansas: Combat Studies Institute Press. ISBN 978-1-940804-27-9.
- Forsyth, Michael J. (2003). The Camden Expedition of 1864. Jefferson, North Carolina: McFarland & Company, Inc. ISBN 0-7864-1554-1.
- Gottschalk, Phil (1991). In Deadly Earnest: The Missouri Brigade. Columbia, Missouri: Missouri River Press. ISBN 978-0-9631136-1-0.
- Johnson, Ludwell H. (1993) [1958]. Red River Campaign: Politics and Cotton in the Civil War. Kent, Ohio: Kent State University Press. ISBN 0-87338-486-5.
- Kennedy, Frances H., ed. (1998). The Civil War Battlefield Guide (2nd ed.). Boston/New York: Houghton Mifflin. ISBN 978-0-395-74012-5.
- Lause, Mark A. (2011). Price's Lost Campaign: The 1864 Invasion of Missouri. Columbia, Missouri: University of Missouri Press. ISBN 978-0-8262-1949-7.
- Lause, Mark A. (2016). The Collapse of Price's Raid: The Beginning of the End in Civil War Missouri. Columbia, Missouri: University of Missouri Press. ISBN 978-0-826-22025-7.
- McGhee, James E. (2008). Guide to Missouri Confederate Regiments, 1861–1865. Fayetteville, Arkansas: University of Arkansas Press. ISBN 978-1-55728-870-7.
- Oates, Stephen B. (1994) [1961]. Confederate Cavalry West of the River (PhD). Austin, Texas: University of Texas Press. ISBN 0-292-71152-2.
- Parrish, William Earl (2001) [1973]. A History of Missouri: 1860–1875. Columbia, Missouri: University of Missouri Press. ISBN 978-0-8262-1376-1.
- Sinisi, Kyle S. (2020) [2015]. The Last Hurrah: Sterling Price's Missouri Expedition of 1864 (paperback ed.). Lanham, Maryland: Rowman & Littlefield. ISBN 978-1-5381-4151-9.
- Wright, John D. (2013). The Routledge Encyclopedia of Civil War Biographies. New York: Routledge. ISBN 978-0-415-87803-6.
