= 10th Texas Field Battery =

Artillery battery in the Confederate States Army

10th Texas Field Battery Pratt's Texas Battery Hynson's Texas Battery
- Active: March 1, 1861 – May/June, 1865
- Allegiance: Confederate States of America
- Branch: Confederate States Army
- Type: Artillery
- Engagements: American Civil War; Marmaduke's Second Expedition into Missouri; Skirmish at Taylor's Creek; Little Rock campaign; Battle of Bayou Fourche; Battle of Pine Bluff; Battle of Ditch Bayou; Price's Raid; Battle of Fort Davidson; Second Battle of Independence; Battle of Byram's Ford; Battle of Marais des Cygnes; Battle of Mine Creek

The 10th Texas Field Battery (also known as Pratt's Texas Battery and Hynson's Texas Battery) was an artillery battery that served in the Confederate States Army during the American Civil War. After being formed in early 1861 by Benjamin H. Pratt, the battery served with a cavalry formation led by Colonel William Henry Parsons for part of 1862. It was called upon to enter Missouri in support of troop movements related to the Battle of Prairie Grove, but this did not occur. It then operated along the Mississippi River in early 1863, harassing enemy shipping. The unit then participated in Marmaduke's Second Expedition into Missouri and the Battle of Pine Bluff in 1863. Late in 1864, the battery, now under the command of H. C. Hynson, served in Price's Raid, participating in several battles and skirmishes, including the disastrous Battle of Mine Creek. One source claims the unit's service ended on May 26, 1865, while a Confederate report dated June 1, 1865, states that it existed but did not have cannons. Confederate forces in the Trans-Mississippi Department surrendered on June 2.

== Early service ==
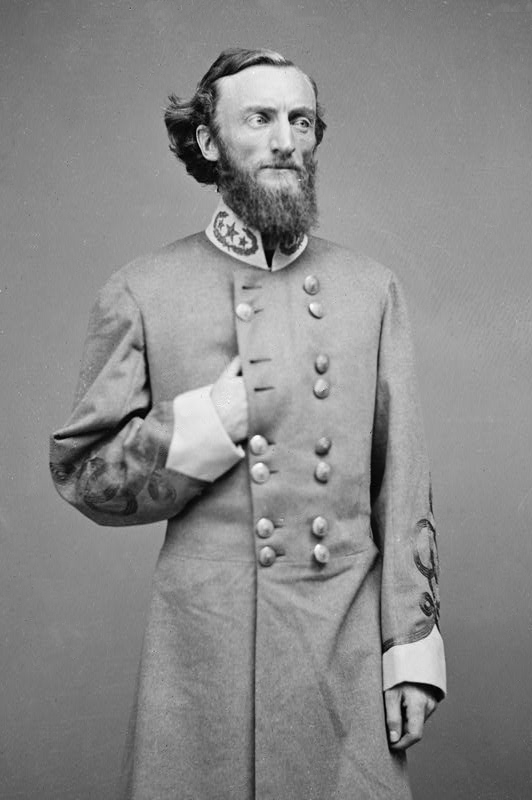
John S. Marmaduke, CSA

The 10th Texas Field Battery was organized on March 1, 1861. The unit was raised by Captain Benjamin H. Pratt, a Texas railroad builder. When the battery was mustered into Confederate service in Jefferson, Texas, it contained 72 men drawn from Harrison, Marion, and Cass counties. Arriving in Arkansas in May 1862, Pratt's battery was assigned to Colonel William Henry Parsons's brigade, which was split up across the Arkansas Delta, harassing Union forces along the White River. At this time, the battery had eight cannons, but often operated in two- or four-gun sections. It sometimes harassed Union shipping on the Mississippi River during mid-1862. The battery continued to operate with Parsons's brigade through late 1862, although it was often not under Parsons's direct command. Late in 1862, Pratt's battery and Parsons's brigade were intended to be sent to Missouri to tie down Union troops in support of the movements leading up to the Battle of Prairie Grove, but this did not occur. During the early part of 1863, the battery served along the Mississippi River and sometimes harassed Union Navy transports and gunboats; it was claimed to have caused one sinking and to have damaged another ship. In the spring, the battery served under Brigadier General John S. Marmaduke during Marmaduke's Second Expedition into Missouri.

Marmaduke's raid saw Confederate cavalry strike into Missouri in hopes of distracting Union troops from more important areas and peaked with an abortive attempt to capture Cape Girardeau, Missouri. From April 17 to May 2, Pratt's battery served in the raid, under Colonel George Washington Carter. Two guns of the battery were part of a force sent to strike Patterson beginning on April 19 at midnight, and while the battery was present on the field at Cape Girardeau, it was only lightly engaged. After the raid failed due to the repulse at Cape Girardeau and the arrival of Union reinforcements, Marmaduke's men concentrated on Crowley's Ridge in early May. Still serving in Carter's brigade, the battery, which was now armed with four cannons, moved to Colt, Arkansas, (then known as Taylor's Creek) as part of a plan to capture a Union cavalry force operating in the area. Early on May 11, Carter's men made contact with the Union cavalry, bringing on the Skirmish at Taylor's Creek. During the action, Marmaduke detached two of Pratt's cannons 3 miles (4.8 km) to the south, as he was worried about Union reinforcements and wanted to protect the center of his line. After a brief skirmish, the Union cavalry retreated, but were able to escape as Carter did not order a pursuit. The battery then returned to operating against river shipping, this time both on the Mississippi River and the Arkansas River. When Confederate troops abandoned the city of Little Rock, Arkansas, on September 10, Pratt's battery was at the Arkansas River, where it covered the crossing of the retreating Confederate units. The main part of the battery covered a ford, while a smaller portion was sent to support Etter's Arkansas Battery. Both Etter's guns and the detachment from Pratt's battery were soon silenced by Union counterbattery fire. Later that day, in the Battle of Bayou Fourche, Pratt's battery, which was armed with 12-pounder howitzers at this time, supported Colonel Robert C. Newton's cavalry with artillery fire.

When Marmaduke moved against the city of Pine Bluff, Arkansas, in October, Pratt's battery accompanied him. On October 24, Marmaduke readied his forces to begin moving towards the city and its Union garrison. Near the Saline River, the Confederate force split to conduct a pincer attack. Pratt's battery was part of Newton's wing of the Confederate force, as part of Major B. D. Chenoweth's brigade. Early on the 25th, Newton's cavalry reached a brickyard southeast of Pine Bluff, where they dismounted and waited for the other wing of the Confederate force to fire a signal shot, which would begin the Battle of Pine Bluff. Once the shot was fired, Newton's men, led by Wood's Missouri Cavalry Battalion, charged the town, but were halted by Union defenders. Pratt's battery was then deployed to fire on Union sharpshooters deployed in houses; the defenders were driven back further into the town by the fire. The Union soldiers were eventually driven back into a barricaded position in the town square. Pratt's battery was brought up to fire on the position and particularly Union troops in the cupola of the courthouse. While the courthouse cupola defenders were driven out of their positions, the main Union barricades held. Ruffner's Missouri Battery had been firing from a churchyard, and Pratt's battery joined the Missouri gunners in that position. The Union position could not be subdued, and Marmaduke believed that a frontal attack would be too costly, so the Confederates abandoned the town in the mid-afternoon. The battery then spent the winter of 1863–1864 stationed in northeastern Louisiana. Beginning on May 23, 1864, the battery accompanied a force of Missouri cavalry led by Colonel Colton Greene to a landing on the Mississippi River in Arkansas, where it fired on several transports through June 4. The intention was to disrupt the portion of the Union supply line dependent on the Mississippi River. At this time, Pratt's battery had six cannons. It was split into multiple detachments in order to maximize disruption of river traffic. On May 24, the battery dueled with the gunboat USS Curlew for about half an hour before withdrawing, and it fought other skirmishes with elements of the Union Navy and the Mississippi Marine Brigade. When Union forces responded to Greene's harassment of river traffic by landing a sizable infantry force near the Confederate position on June 5, the Confederates withdrew and Pratt's battery covered a bridge during the Battle of Ditch Bayou, which was fought on June 6. At Ditch Bayou, the Confederates held off Union forces for some time before withdrawing when they ran out of artillery ammunition. The Union troops were unable to mount an effective pursuit.

== Price's Raid ==
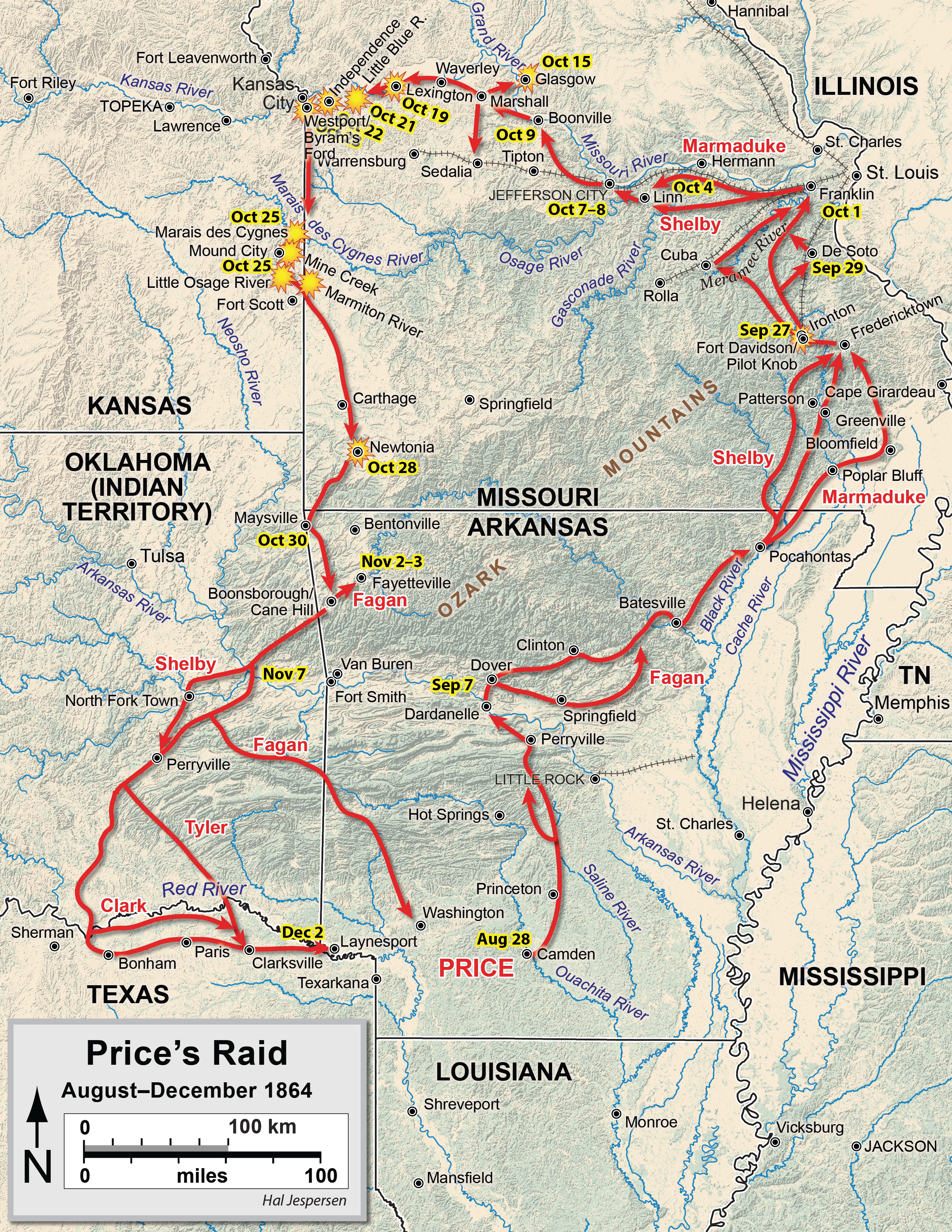
Map of Price's Raid

On February 19, 1864, Pratt was elevated to the rank of major and placed in command of a four-battery formation known as the Second Horse Artillery Battalion that included in it his former unit. Second Lieutenant H. C. Hynson took command of the battery and was promoted to captain. When Major General Sterling Price invaded Missouri in late 1864, Hynson's battery accompanied the expedition. During Price's Raid, the battery was armed with three cannons and was assigned to Marmaduke's division. On September 27, Price's men were preparing to attack a Union defensive position at Fort Davidson. As part of the preparation for the Battle of Fort Davidson, two guns each from Harris's Missouri Battery and Hynson's battery were attempted to be dragged up to the top of Shepherd Mountain. According to historian Kyle Sinisi, only two pieces could be brought to the summit, while the historians Bryce Suderow and R. Scott House state that four were placed on the mountain. Another gun from the battery was sent to a position near a creek in order to support the direct assaults against the fort, along with another cannon from Harris's battery. Fire from Union artillery in the fort forced the two guns to withdraw. Union cannon also fired on the pieces on Shepherd Mountain, with much greater effectiveness than the Confederate fire down from the mountain. The Confederate attacks against Fort Davidson were unsuccessful, although the fort was taken the next day after its defenders abandoned it. Price then moved his army northwest; plans to attack the cities of St. Louis and Jefferson City were abandoned due to the strength of the positions.

During the movement across Missouri, Hynson's battery fought in a skirmish at California on the afternoon of October 9. The Confederate column continued west and reached the vicinity of Kansas City in late October. On October 22, pursuing Union cavalry caught up with Price's rear guard near Independence, bringing on the Second Battle of Independence. Hynson's battery was engaged during the action, which ended in a Confederate defeat. The next day, the battery saw more action as part of a Confederate defensive line during the Battle of Byram's Ford. Concurrently with the fighting at Byram's Ford, Price's army was decisively defeated at the Battle of Westport and began retreating through Kansas. The victorious Union soldiers pursued Price, and caught up to part of his army, bringing on the Battle of Marais des Cygnes on October 25. At Marais des Cygnes, Hynson's battery was armed with three cannons, variously reported as either a 6-pounder smoothbore and two Parrott rifles or a 6-pounder smoothbore and two 12-pounder Napoleons. The battery made a stand at a river crossing during part of the action, and towards the end of the battle, the battery was part of a force commanded by Brigadier General John B. Clark Jr. that provided a rear guard for the retreating Confederates. Due to an ammunition shortage, Hynson's battery left the 6-pounder on the field when Clark's men finally abandoned their positions. One Confederate officer present at the battle stated that the battery "did such good execution that the enemy were compelled to fall back".

Later on the 25th, Price's Confederates fought another action, the Battle of Mine Creek. Hynson's gunners manned two cannons on the right of the Confederate line at the battle. Another cannon in the middle of the Confederate line was either crewed by Hynson's men or Hughey's Arkansas Battery. During the battle, Union cavalry charged the Confederate line, and came under canister fire from Hynson's and Harris's batteries. Once the Union attack hit home, the Confederate defenders routed, and Mine Creek ended in a Confederate disaster, with many cannons and hundreds of men, including Marmaduke, captured. Price's defeated survivors continued retreating until they reached Texas in December. Pratt was fatally wounded during the retreat. A listing of Confederate artillery units produced by Ohio State University states that the battery's service ended on May 26, 1865, while a Confederate strength report as of June 1, 1865 lists the battery as being located at Marshall, Texas, but without any cannons. Confederate forces in the Trans-Mississippi Department surrendered on June 2.

== Sources ==
- Bearss, Edwin C. (Winter 1964). "Marmaduke Attacks Pine Bluff". The Arkansas Historical Quarterly. 23 (4). Arkansas Historical Association: 291–313. doi:10.2307/40030666. ISSN 0004-1823. JSTOR 40030666.
- Castel, Albert (1998). "Pilot Knob, Missouri". In Kennedy, Frances H. (ed.). The Civil War Battlefield Guide (2nd ed.). Boston/New York: Houghton Mifflin. ISBN 978-0-395-74012-5.
- Christ, Mark K. (2010). Civil War Arkansas 1863: The Battle for a State. Norman, Oklahoma: University of Oklahoma Press. ISBN 978-0-8061-4433-7.
- Collins, Charles D. Jr. (2016). Battlefield Atlas of Price's Missouri Expedition of 1864 (PDF). Fort Leavenworth, Kansas: Combat Studies Institute Press. ISBN 978-1-940804-27-9.
- Doyle, Daniel R. (2011). "The Civil War in the Greenville Bends". Arkansas Historical Quarterly. 70 (2): 131–161.
- Frazier, Donald S. (2020). Tempest Over Texas: The Fall and Winter Campaigns of 1863–1864. State House Press. ISBN 9781933337852.
- Kennedy, Frances H., ed. (1998). The Civil War Battlefield Guide (2nd ed.). Boston/New York: Houghton Mifflin. ISBN 978-0-395-74012-5.
- Kohl, Rhonda M. (Summer 2005). "Raising Thunder with the Secesh: Powell Clayton's Federal Cavalry at Taylor's Creek and Mount Vernon, Arkansas, May 11, 1863". The Arkansas Historical Quarterly. 64 (2): 146–170. doi:10.2307/40031057. JSTOR 40031057.
- Lause, Mark A. (2016). The Collapse of Price's Raid: The Beginning of the End in Civil War Missouri. Columbia, Missouri: University of Missouri Press. ISBN 978-0-826-22025-7.
- Neal, Diane; Kremm, Thomas W. (1993). Lion of the South: General Thomas C. Hindman. Macon, Georgia: Mercer University Press. ISBN 0-86554-422-0.
- Sibley, F. Ray (2014). Confederate Artillery Organizations: An Alphabetical Listing of the Officers and Batteries of the Confederacy, 1861–1865. El Dorado Hills, California: Savas Beatie. ISBN 978-1-61121-230-3.
- Sinisi, Kyle S. (2020) [2015]. The Last Hurrah: Sterling Price's Missouri Expedition of 1864 (paperback ed.). Lanham, Maryland: Rowman & Littlefield. ISBN 978-1-5381-4151-9.
- Slawson, Douglas J. (2010). "The Vincentian Experience of the Civil War in Missouri". American Catholic Studies. 121 (4): 31–60.
- Smith, Myron J. (2021). After Vicksburg: The Civil War on Western Waters, 1863–1865. Jefferson, North Carolina: McFarland & Company. ISBN 978-1-4766-4370-0.
- Suderow, Bryce A.; House, R. Scott (2014). The Battle of Pilot Knob: Thunder in Arcadia Valley. Cape Girardeau, Missouri: Southeast Missouri State University Press. ISBN 978-0-9903530-2-7.
- Sutherland, Daniel E. (1994). "1864: "A Strange, Wild Time"". In Christ, Mark K. (ed.). Rugged and Sublime: The Civil War in Arkansas. Fayetteville, Arkansas: University of Arkansas Press. p. 104–144. ISBN 1-55728-357-5.
- The War of the Rebellion: A Compilation of the Official Records of the Union and Confederate Armies. Vol. 22. Washington, D.C.: United States Government Printing Office. 1888. OCLC 262466842.
- The War of the Rebellion: A Compilation of the Official Records of the Union and Confederate Armies. Vol. 48, Part 2: Union and Confederate Correspondence. Washington, D.C.: United States Government Printing Office. 1896. OCLC 262466842.
