= Fort Curtis (Missouri) =

Coordinates: 37°35′25″N 90°37′35″W

Fort Hovey was a small Civil War era earth-and-wood fort built on a hill overlooking the junction of the road running south out of Ironton, Missouri and the road running east to Fredericktown, Missouri. Fort Hovey was intended to help protect the Arcadia Valley and the iron mines located on Pilot Knob. The fort was located on Fort Hill near the town of Arcadia, Missouri on the (then) property of the Fort Hill Methodist Episcopal Church, South and the present day Arcadia Valley United Presbyterian Church. This fortification was named Fort Hovey in honor of the commander of the 33rd Illinois Volunteer Infantry Regiment (Union), Colonel Charles E. Hovey. The 33rd. Illinois was stationed there during the Autumn and Winter of 1861-62, at which time they built the fort.

After the Union victory led by Brig. Gen. Samuel R. Curtis at the Battle of Pea Ridge, Arkansas on March 8, 1862, Fort Hovey was renamed Fort Curtis in his honor. Fort Curtis was occupied until the Confederate troops advanced into Missouri in 1864. The fort was then abandoned and the Union troops were relocated to Fort Davidson, about 2.5 miles north at the town of Pilot Knob. Fort Curtis was briefly used as an observation post by Confederate Soldiers just before, during and shortly after the Battle of Pilot Knob.

Today, the location of Fort Hovey/Fort Curtis is marked with a waymarker.

Fort Curtis is also the name of a Union fort that existed in Helena, Arkansas during the Battle of Helena on July 4, 1863. Helena, Arkansas is located on the Mississippi River. A historic marker on Fort Curtis is located on Perry Street in Helena just 1/2 block east of the intersection of Perry and Columbia Streets. It was also named in honor of Brig. General Samuel R. Curtis.

== Location ==
Located on Church Street in Arcadia, Missouri near the junction or Missouri State Highway 21 and Missouri State Highway 72.

N37°35'25" W90°37'35"

The site of Fort Curtis in Helena, Arkansas is located on the block bound by the present day Perry Street (north side), Franklin Street (east side), Porter Street (south side), and Columbia Street (west side). The First Baptist Church of Helena and the Sidney H. Horner House now occupy the site.
