= Fort Davidson =

Historic site in Missouri

Fort Davidson Battle of Pilot Knob State Historic Site
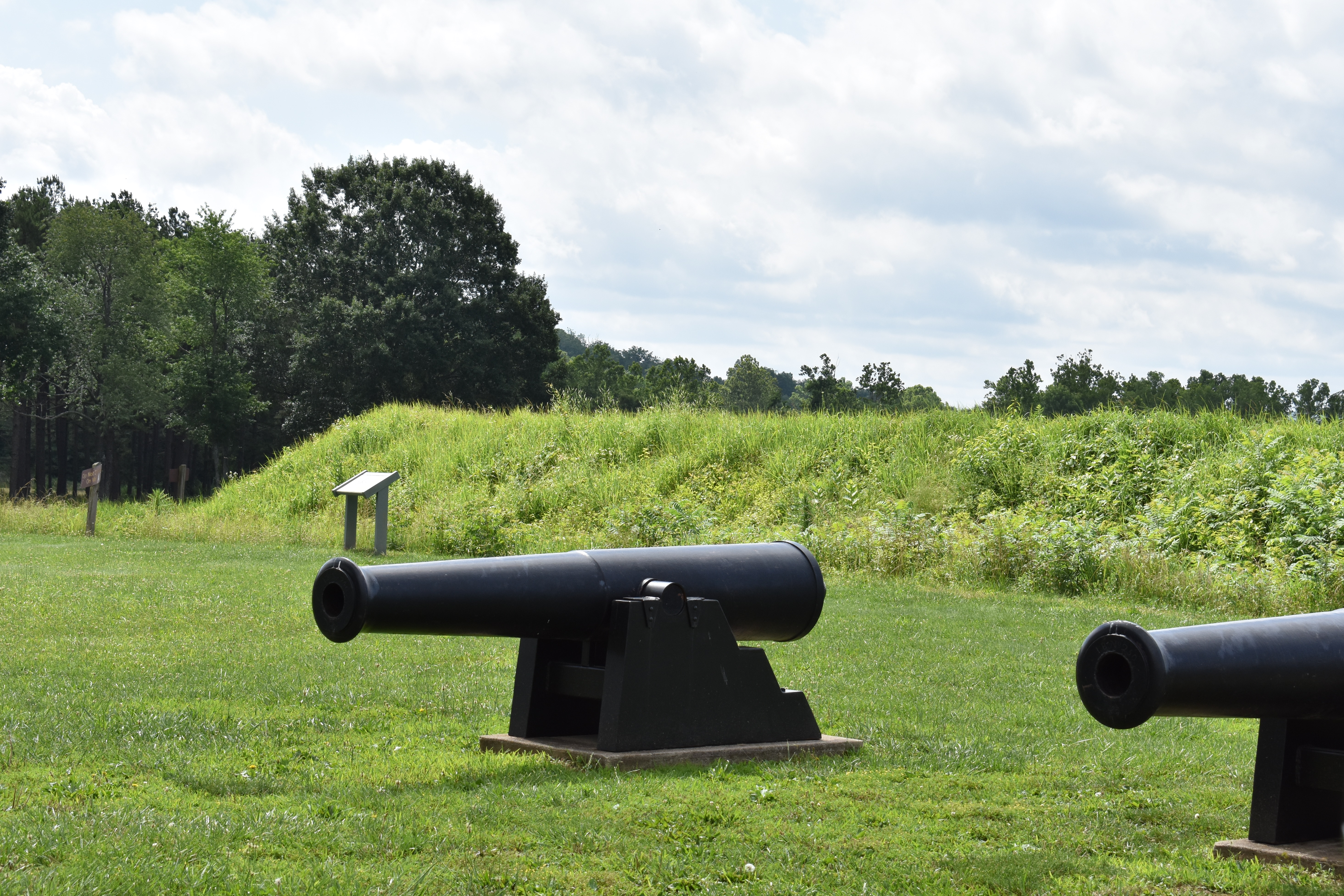
- Cannons at Fort Davidson

- Location within Missouri Location within the United States
- Location: Pilot Knob, Iron County, Missouri, United States
- Coordinates: 37°37′11″N 90°38′24″W
- Area: 77.4 acres (31.3 ha)
- Established: 1968
- Visitors: 139,425 (in 2019)
- Website: Battle of Pilot Knob State Historic Site
- Fort Davidson
- U.S. National Register of Historic Places
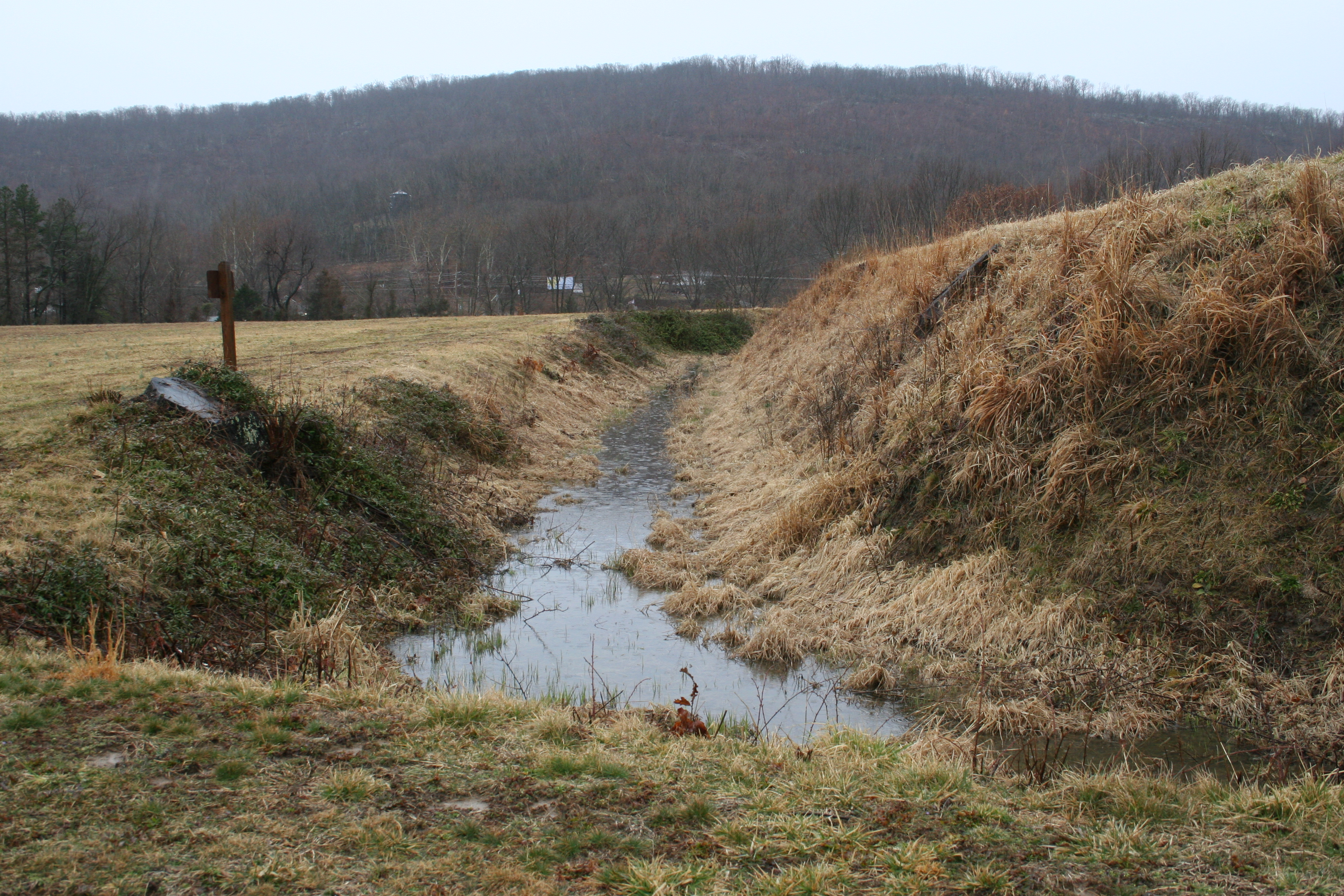
- Fort Davidson earthworks and moat
- Location: Pilot Knob, Missouri
- Area: 9.9 acres (4.0 ha)
- Built: 1863
- NRHP reference No.: 70000332
- Added to NRHP: February 26, 1970

Fort Davidson, a fortification near the town of Pilot Knob, Missouri, was the site of the Battle of Fort Davidson during the American Civil War. Built by Union Army soldiers during the American Civil War, the fort repulsed Confederate attacks during the Battle of Fort Davidson on September 27, 1864, during Price's Raid. That night, the Union garrison blew up the fort's magazine and abandoned the site. A mass grave was constructed on the site to bury battlefield dead. After the war, the area was used by a mining company, before passing into private hands and eventually the administration of the United States Forest Service. In 1968, the Battle of Pilot Knob State Historic Site was created as a Missouri State Park. The fort itself was added to the National Register of Historic Places in 1970. As of 2020, a visitors center containing a museum is located within the park. The museum contains a fiber optic display, as well as artifacts including Brigadier General Thomas Ewing Jr.'s sword. The fort's walls are still visible, as is the crater created when the magazine was detonated. A monument marks the location of the mass grave.

== History ==
Fort Davidson is near the town of Pilot Knob, which is located in a plain between four peaks: Pilot Knob, Shepherd Mountain, Rock Mountain, and Cedar Hill. Fort Davidson was preceded by an earlier structure known as Fort Hovey (later renamed Fort Curtis, after Major General Samuel R. Curtis), which was built by Union Army soldiers in 1861, during the American Civil War. Fort Curtis was armed with four 32-pounder cannons, three 24-pounder howitzers, and two Coehorn mortars. Eventually, eight smaller artillery pieces were added to the fort. Fort Curtis's location was viewed as a disadvantage, as it was not located in a place where it could easily guard the important local iron deposits and a nearby railroad. Fort Davidson was constructed in 1863 near the base of Pilot Knob in order to better protect those features.

Built in the shape of a hexagon, Fort Davidson had earthen walls. In his book Price's Lost Campaign: The 1864 Invasion of Missouri, the historian Mark A. Lause stated that the fort's walls were 100 feet (30 m), while the historian Kyle Sinisi stated that they were 150 feet (46 m) long. These walls were either 5 feet (1.5 m), as per Sinisi, or 9 feet (2.7 m) high, as per Fort Davidson's National Register of Historic Places nomination form and the historian Albert E. Castel. Two rifle pits, also described as trenches, were constructed: one to the north and one to the southwest. The fort's magazine was located in the inner portion of the fort and was located underground, with 15 feet (4.6 m) of dirt and some wood planking serving as protective covering. An 1864 inspection produced a report finding that the terrain of the mountains exposed defenders of Fort Davidson to potential enfilade fire. Surrounding the fort was a 10 feet (3.0 m) wide moat. Castel and Lause state that the moat was around 6 feet (1.8 m) deep, the NRHP form provides the depth as 7 feet (2.1 m) and Sinisi and a writer for the Missouri Archaeological Society give a depth of 8 feet (2.4 m). Fort Davidson was named for Brigadier General John Wynn Davidson, who had commanded Union troops in the area in 1862.

=== Battle of Fort Davidson ===
In September 1864, Major General Sterling Price of the Confederate States Army led his Army of Missouri from Arkansas into Missouri with hopes of capturing St. Louis and challenging Union control of the state, in a campaign known as Price's Raid. On September 24, Price learned that a Union force held the town of Pilot Knob, which represented one end of the St. Louis and Iron Mountain Railroad. Uncomfortable with having a Union garrison to the rear of his line of advance, Price decided to capture it. The Union force at Pilot Knob consisted of 1,456 soldiers of whom 450 were militia and 150 were civilians. In command was Brigadier General Thomas Ewing Jr., who was disliked by Missouri Confederates due to his decision to issue General Orders No. 11 the prior year, which had depopulated four counties of western Missouri. Price, meanwhile, ordered part of his army under the command of Brigadier General Joseph O. Shelby to operate north of Pilot Knob and disrupt the railroad. The rest of the Confederate army, under the command of Brigadier General John S. Marmaduke and Major General James F. Fagan aimed for the town itself.

On the morning of September 27, Confederate troops forced Union advance guards from the towns of Arcadia and Ironton. Artillery fire from Fort Davidson halted the Confederate advance. Ewing withdrew most of his men into Fort Davidson. That afternoon, the Confederates placed artillery on Shepherd Mountain, but the Union guns within Fort Davidson were able to drive the Confederate cannoneers off. Price's plan was to attack with five different units advancing from multiple directions, but these attacks were not well coordinated, and the Union defenders were able to repulse the attacks in piecemeal. Few Confederates were even able to reach Fort Davidson's moat, and those that did were unable to breach the walls. Price eventually called off attacks for the day intending to resume combat the next day. However, that night, the fort's defenders evacuated the post and blew up the magazine. Confederate troops who were supposed to be guarding the escape route Ewing took did not notice the movement. Ewing's command suffered 213 casualties, while Confederate losses were between 800 and 1,000. Men killed during the battle were buried by Confederate soldiers in a mass grave at the site.

== Battle of Pilot Knob State Historic Site ==
After the war ended in 1865, a mining company used the area of the fort as a livestock corral. Union veterans held a meeting commemorating the battle at the fort site in 1882, and Grand Army of the Republic meetings were held within the enclosure. After the mining company sold the land the fort was located on in 1905, a local organization known as the Pilot Knob Memorial Association bought Fort Davidson from a third party. Attempts to have the site designated as a national battlefield failed. Eventually, the land passed to General Ewing's son Thomas, who eventually transferred it to the United States Forest Service at some point after 1934. Little interpretation existed at the site under Forest Service administration. In either 1968 or 1969, the Battle of Pilot Knob State Historic Site was added to the Missouri State Parks system through an agreement with the Forest Service. By 1969, the walls of the fort were reported to have been reduced to roughly 5 feet (1.5 m) high, and the crater was measured at roughly 50 feet (15 m) by 100 feet (30 m). The fort was then added to the NRHP on February 26, 1970, with a reference number of 70000332. The NRHP listing encompasses 9.9 acres (4.0 ha). The Missouri Department of Natural Resources acquired full control of the site in 1987.

The ruins of Fort Davidson are preserved in the Battle of Pilot Knob State Historic Site. The fort's walls are still visible, as is the crater created when the magazine was detonated. The mass grave is marked with a granite monument bearing the inscription "Whatever transgressions existed on either side, let the passage of time bury amid the ruins of the past". A visitor center and museum, for which construction was started in 1991, is located within the state park. Among other things, the building contains a research library, artifacts such as Ewing's sword, and a fiber optic display. A playground, picnic area, and a trail provide other amenities at the site. As of 2023, the park encompassed 77.4 acres (31.3 ha), including six structures, 3.4 miles (5.5 km) of trails, and 0.24 miles (0.39 km) of roadways. It logged 130,065 visitors that year and had an annual budget of $66,601. The American Battlefield Trust has been involved in the preservation of 41 acres (17 ha) at the site. Archaeology at the battlefield site has uncovered projectiles, projectile fragments, and various other military-related artifacts.

== Sources ==
- Busch, Walter E. (2011) [2010]. Fort Davidson and the Battle of Pilot Knob (ebook ed.). Charleston, South Carolina: The History Press. ISBN 978-1-61423-028-1.
- Castel, Albert (1998). "Fort Davidson, Missouri". In Kennedy, Frances H. (ed.). The Civil War Battlefield Guide (2nd ed.). Boston/New York: Houghton Mifflin. ISBN 978-0-395-74012-5.
- Collins, Charles D. Jr. (2016). Battlefield Atlas of Price's Missouri Expedition of 1864 (PDF). Fort Leavenworth, Kansas: Combat Studies Institute Press. ISBN 978-1-940804-27-9.
- Lause, Mark (2011). Price's Lost Campaign: The 1864 Invasion of Missouri (ebook ed.). Columbia, Missouri: University of Missouri Press. ISBN 9780826272638.
- Martens, Richard E. (2011). "Civil War Artifacts from the Battle of Pilot Knob, Iron County, Missouri" (PDF). Missouri Archaeological Society. pp. 12–16.
- Piggott, Charla A. (December 17, 1969). "National Register of Historic Places Inventory Nomination Form". Missouri Department of Natural Resources.
- Sinisi, Kyle S. (2020) [2015]. The Last Hurrah: Sterling Price's Missouri Expedition of 1864 (paperback ed.). Lanham, Maryland: Rowman & Littlefield. ISBN 978-1-5381-4151-9.
- "Update to the Civil War Sites Advisory Commission Report on the Nation's Civil War Battlefields: State of Missouri" (PDF). Washington, D.C.: American Battlefield Protection Program. March 2011.
