= Fort Curtis =

Fort Curtis may refer to:

- Fort Curtis (Missouri), a former Union Army installation near Ironton, Missouri
- Fort Curtis (Arkansas), a partially-reconstructed fort in Helena-West Helena, Arkansas
