= Forrest Shepherd =

American scientist

Forrest Shepherd (October 31, 1800 – December 7, 1888) was an American scientist.

Shepherd, son of Daniel and Anna (Forrest) Shepherd, was born in Boscawen, N. H., October 31, 1800. He entered Dartmouth College in 1823, but spent the Senior year at Yale College. He was admitted to the bachelor's degree at both Colleges in 1827. He remained in New Haven as a graduate student for two or three years, and on April 29, 1832, married Sophia W. Storer, of Rutland, Vt. In 1841 and 1842 he took a partial course in the Yale Divinity School.

His active life was spent in teaching and in the study of the natural sciences, and while his home remained in New Haven he was absent during a large portion of the time on geological and geographical explorations. In 1846 he visited the southern shore of Lake Superior, where he surveyed and located several of the copper and iron mines which have since become important; and in 1847 he surveyed the mineral lands between Lake Superior and Hudson's Bay. In 1848 he traveled extensively in Great Britain, in 1849 in Cuba and Central America, and in 1850 and 1851 he explored nearly the whole of California. In 1856 and 1857 he explored the island of Newfoundland, and in 1859 and 1860 New Brunswick and the islands in the Bay of Fundy. In 1865 he visited Northern Mexico and the southwestern part of the union.

From 1847 to 1856 he held the Professorship of Economic Geology and Agricultural Chemistry in Western Reserve College, at Hudson, Ohio, delivering an annual course of lectures in fulfillment of the duties of his chair. During the American Civil War, Shepherd wrote to President Abraham Lincoln suggesting that hydrogen chloride be employed to incapacitate Confederate troops or force them to retreat, but his idea was not adopted.

His wife died before him, and his later years were spent with his children. He died in Norwich, Connecticut, December 7, 1888, in his 89th year, while visiting his eldest daughter, the widow of the Rev. William Hutchison. He left also a daughter, the wife of the Rev. Charles T. Weitzel, and a son.

Shepherd is the namesake of Shepherd Mountain in Missouri.
