= The Collapse of Price's Raid =

2016 book by Mark A. Lause

The Collapse of Price's Raid: The Beginning of the End in Civil War Missouri
- Cover of the book
- Author: Mark A. Lause
- Language: English
- Subject: Price's Raid
- Genre: Non-fiction
- Publisher: University of Missouri Press
- Publication date: 2016
- Publication place: United States
- Pages: 262
- ISBN: 978-0-8262-2025-7

The Collapse of Price's Raid: The Beginning of the End in Civil War Missouri is a 2016 book by Mark A. Lause and is the second volume in his series about Price's Raid (a campaign during the American Civil War), after Price's Lost Campaign: The 1864 Invasion of Missouri. The book, which is sourced to the Official Records of the War of the Rebellion and contemporary newspaper accounts, as well as to some secondary sources, takes up the story of Price's Raid in early October, after the goal of the campaign shifted, from being a full-scale invasion, to being a raid.

Reviewers noted that the book provided a detailed record of the troops’ movements in the campaign, and also described the political and racial aspects underlying reactions to the raid. The work was criticized for its lack of maps, including one reviewer’s assertion that many readers would be forced to use an atlas in following the narrative. It likewise was criticized for lacking a separate bibliography, and for its reading’s potential difficulty; still, the same reviewers also described the book as "well documented", and as useful to "serious students of the Civil War".

== Content ==
The Collapse of Price's Raid was published in 2016 by the University of Missouri Press and was written by Mark A. Lause. As the second volume in the series, after Price's Lost Campaign: The 1864 Invasion of Missouri, it picks up the story of Price's Raid in the middle of the campaign in early October. By that point, Price had abandoned the idea of a full-scale invasion of Missouri, and instead began to focusing on raiding and gathering supplies. Two of the book's primary sources are the Official Records of the War of the Rebellion and various contemporary newspapers' accounts, although some secondary source material was used. Focuses of the book include the political considerations behind Union reactions to the raid, as well as the highly varied nature of the units, including Confederate States Army and Union Army personnel, in addition to various militia and bushwhacker units. The roles of African Americans and Native Americans are mentioned in the work, with Lause contending that race played a significant role in decision-making during the campaign. Also discussed are the effects of the raid on the local civilian populations.

== Reception ==
In the Journal of Southern History, reviewer Kristen Anderson considered the book's lack of maps problematic, saying detailed descriptions of troop movements could be difficult to visualize. She called the book well researched overall, noting that the effects of United States Native American policy on the campaign was less developed. David Sesser, reviewing for Arkansas Review, said the book did "an admirable job" of compiling unit movements during the campaign. He praised the detailed notes, but cited the limited index, lack of a bibliography, and absence of maps. He said background information was only in the first volume, making the second volume harder to read. Overall, Sesser said the book was useful for "serious students of the Civil War", but not so much for a "casual reader". Professor Patricia Owens reviewed the book for Kansas History. Owens predicted that without maps, readers might need an atlas to follow geographic information. She said the book's notes were "well documented", despite the lack of a bibliography. The large number of names might confuse some readers, though. Owens called the book "informative", saying its treatment of Union politics would interest Kansas history buffs, especially those interested in Governor of Kansas Thomas Carney.

== Sources ==
- Anderson, Kristen (2017). "The Collapse of Price's Raid: The Beginning of the End in Civil War Missouri (review)". Journal of Southern History. 83 (2): 435–436. doi:10.1353/soh.2017.0117. ISSN 2325-6893. S2CID 159653285.
- Owens, Patricia Ann (2016). "The Collapse of Price's Raid: The Beginning of the End of the Civil War in Missouri". Kansas History. 39 (4): 269. ISSN 0149-9114.
- Sesser, David (2017). "The Collapse of Price's Raid: The Beginning of the End in Civil War Missouri". Arkansas Review: A Journal of Delta Studies. 48 (1): 56–57. ISSN 1075-4008.
