= Battle of Fort Davidson =

Battle of the American Civil War

- Part of the American Civil War
Date	September 27, 1864
Location	Iron County, Missouri 37.6194°N 90.6415°W
Result	Union victory

Belligerents
Confederate States	United States (Union)

Commanders and leaders
(Confederate States of America) James Fagan (Confederate States of America) John Marmaduke	(United States) Thomas Ewing

Units involved
(Confederate States of America) Fagan's Division (Confederate States of America) Marmaduke's Division	(United States) Fort Davidson

Strength
5,700–8,700	1,456

Casualties and losses
500–1,000	213
- Location within Missouri

The Battle of Fort Davidson, also known as the Battle of Pilot Knob, was a battle of Price's Missouri Expedition fought on September 27, 1864, near Pilot Knob, Missouri. Confederate troops under the command of Major-General Sterling Price had entered Missouri in September 1864 with hopes of challenging Union control of the state. On September 24, Price learned that Union troops held Pilot Knob. Two days later, he sent part of his command north to disrupt and then moved towards Pilot Knob with the rest of his army. The Confederate divisions of Major-General James Fagan and Brigadier-General John Marmaduke drove Union troops under Brigadier-General Thomas Ewing and Major James Wilson from the lower Arcadia Valley into Fort Davidson on September 26 and on the morning of September 27.

On the afternoon of the 27th, Price aligned troops around Fort Davidson in order to attack it from multiple sides. While intended to occur together, the attacks occurred separately and were repulsed in the same fashion. Brigadier-General William Cabell's Confederate brigade made three separate attacks against the fort, and succeeded in crossing the fort's moat on the final attempt, but were unable to enter the fort. That night, Ewing decided to abandon the fort. His men blew up the fort's magazine and slipped past Confederate troops guarding the escape routes undetected. Some of Price's men temporarily pursued Ewing beginning the next day, but eventually broke off the pursuit to rejoin Price's main body. With his troops dispirited by the unsuccessful attacks at Fort Davidson, Price decided against attacking St. Louis. The Confederate army then moved westwards, before being beaten at the Battle of Westport on October 23. Price's men then withdrew to Texas, having been defeated several more times during the retreat and pursued much of the way. The site of Fort Davidson is preserved as a historic site and is listed on the National Register of Historic Places.

== Background ==
At the start of the American Civil War in 1861, the state of Missouri was a slave state, but did not secede. However, the state was politically divided: Governor Claiborne Jackson and the Missouri State Guard (MSG) supported secession and the rebellion, while Brigadier-General Nathaniel Lyon and the Union Army supported the United States and opposed secession. Under Major-General Sterling Price, the MSG defeated Union armies at the battles of Wilson's Creek and Lexington in 1861, but by the end of the year, Price and the MSG were restricted to the southwestern portion of the state. Meanwhile, Jackson and a portion of the state legislature voted to secede and join the Confederacy, while another element of the legislature voted to reject secession, essentially giving the state two governments. In March 1862, a Confederate defeat at the Battle of Pea Ridge in Arkansas gave the Union control of Missouri, and Confederate activity in the state was largely restricted to guerrilla warfare and raids throughout 1862 and 1863.

By the beginning of September 1864, events in the eastern United States, especially the Confederate defeat in the Atlanta campaign, gave Abraham Lincoln, who supported continuing the war, an edge in the 1864 United States presidential election over George McClellan, who favored ending the war. At this point, the Confederacy had very little chance of winning the war. Meanwhile, in the Trans-Mississippi Theater, the Confederates had defeated Union attackers during the Red River campaign in Louisiana, which took place from March through May. As events east of the Mississippi River turned against the Confederates, General Kirby Smith, Confederate commander of the Trans-Mississippi Department, was ordered to transfer the infantry under his command to the fighting in the Eastern and Western theaters. However, this proved to be impossible, as the Union Navy controlled the Mississippi River, preventing a large-scale crossing. Despite having limited resources for an offensive, Smith decided that an attack designed to divert Union troops from the principal theaters of combat would have an equivalent effect to the proposed transfer of troops, through decreasing the Confederates' numerical disparity east of the Mississippi. Price and the Confederate governor, Thomas Reynolds, suggested that an invasion of Missouri would be an effective offensive; Smith approved the plan and appointed Price to command the offensive. Price expected that the offensive would create a popular uprising against Union control of Missouri, divert Union troops away from the principal theaters of combat (many of the Union troops previously defending Missouri had been transferred out of the state, leaving the Missouri State Militia to be the state's primary defensive force), and aid McClellan's chance of defeating Lincoln in the election. On September 19, Price's column, named the Army of Missouri, entered the state.

== Prelude ==
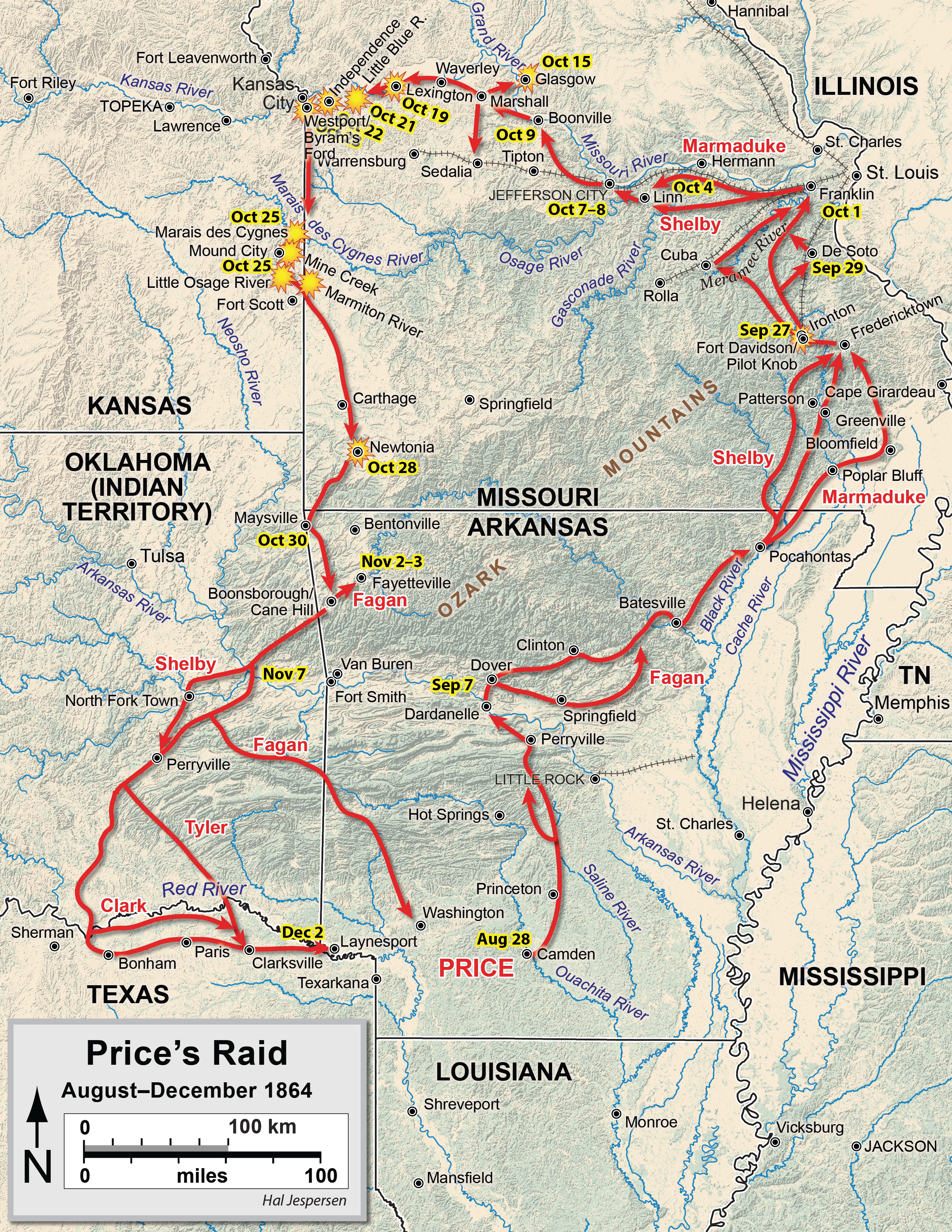
Map of Price's raid

When Price entered the state, he had about 13,000 men with him, many of which were poorly armed or had no weapons at all. The Confederate force included 14 cannons, but these were of small bore, which limited their effectiveness against fortifications. Price's force was divided into three divisions, commanded by Major-General James Fagan and brigadier-generals John Marmaduke and Joseph O. Shelby. Around 10,000 Union soldiers were scattered across Missouri, of whom about 3,000 were assigned to the St. Louis region, under the command of Brigadier-General Thomas Ewing Many of Ewing's men were in units of the Missouri State Militia or the Enrolled Missouri Militia. While many of the MSM men had guerilla warfare experience, the EMM soldiers were poorly trained and equipped.

Price learned that the town of Pilot Knob and one end of the St. Louis and Iron Mountain Railroad was held by Union troops while he was at Fredericktown on September 24. Price did not want to leave a Union force free to operate in his rear, so he decided to move aggressively against the Union column. To accomplish this, he sent Shelby with his division north of Pilot Knob to disrupt the railroad on September 26, while sending Fagan and Marmaduke directly against the Union troops. Ewing commanded the Union force near Pilot Knob, which was 1,456 strong: 856 Union Army soldiers, 450 MSM men, and a group of 150 mobilized civilians. Additionally, Price learned on the 25th that Union Major-General Andrew Smith and 8,000 men were near St. Louis, which caused him to doubt his ability to take the city.

On September 26, Price began moving his army from Fredericktown towards the Arcadia Valley, with Fagan's division in the lead. The entrance to the valley, Shut-In Gap, was unguarded, so Fagan sent Colonel William F. Slemons's brigade, temporarily under the command of Colonel John C. Wright, forward. Wright, with about 250 men, surprised a small Union detachment, which managed to send a messenger warning a detachment of the 47th Missouri Infantry Regiment at Ironton and the Union command at Fort Davidson, further north. Ewing responded by sending 80 men from the 3rd MSM Cavalry Regiment to investigate the reports. Wright's men scattered the MSM soldiers, but were repulsed by the detachment of the 47th Missouri Infantry when they tried to drive through Ironton. After hearing the sounds of battle from the valley, Ewing sent Major James Wilson and several hundred cavalrymen towards the fighting and later followed Wilson himself with a force from the 14th Iowa Infantry Regiment and two cannons from the 2nd Missouri Light Artillery Regiment. The two groups joined with the Union detachment already in Ironton around 15:00, attacked under the command of Wilson, and drove Wright back towards the gap. Ewing, under the impression that he was fighting with Shelby's men, left Wilson and his force in the valley and personally returned to Fort Davidson. He then made preparations to defend the fort against Confederate attack and send extra supplies up the railroad to Smith.

As more Confederate troops passed through Shut-In Gap, Wilson realized that he was facing a very large enemy force. At around 22:30, Ewing gave Wilson permission to withdraw to a more secure position near Ironton. The reports also made Ewing unsure about the wisdom of attempting to hold Pilot Knob. That night, he asked several of his subordinates for their opinions about the best course of action. After some discussion, Ewing decided to hold the fort, influenced by the uncertainty of being able to hold the poorly trained portions of his force together during a retreat. The political aspirations of Ewing and Colonel Thomas C. Fletcher of the 47th Missouri Infantry also contributed to the decision to fight it out, as a retreat was thought to be politically detrimental. The supplies and some civilians were evacuated via the railroad.

=== Fort Davidson ===
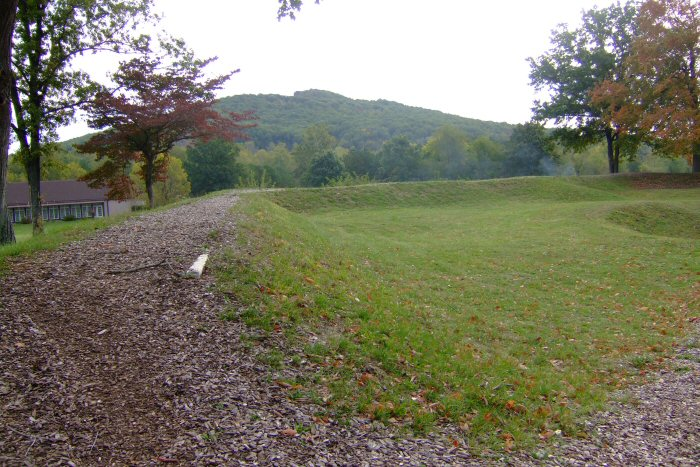
One side of Fort Davidson as seen today. The crater from the powder magazine blast is visible on the far right. Pilot Knob is the hill at the back.

Fort Davidson is near the town of Pilot Knob, Missouri, which is located in a plain between four peaks: Pilot Knob, Shepherd Mountain, Rock Mountain, and Cedar Hill. Fort Davidson was preceded by an earlier structure known as Fort Hovey (later renamed Fort Curtis, after Major-General Samuel Curtis), which was built by Union Army soldiers in 1861 south of the future location of Fort Davidson. Fort Curtis was armed with four 32-pounder guns, three 24-pounder howitzers, and two Coehorn mortars. Eventually, eight smaller artillery pieces were added to the fort. Fort Curtis's location was viewed as a disadvantage, as it was not located in a place where it could easily guard the important local iron deposits and a nearby railroad. Fort Davidson was constructed in 1863 near the base of Pilot Knob in order to better protect those features.

Built in the shape of a hexagon, Fort Davidson had earthen walls. In his book Price's Lost Campaign: The 1864 Invasion of Missouri, the historian Mark A. Lause stated that the fort's walls were 100 feet (30 m) long, while the historian Kyle Sinisi stated that they were 150 feet (46 m) long. These wall were either 5 feet (1.5 m), as per Sinisi, or 9 feet (2.7 m) high, as per Fort Davidson's National Register nomination form and historian Albert Castel. Two rifle pits, also described as trenches, were constructed: one to the north and one to the southwest. The fort's magazine was located in the inner portion of the fort and was located underground, with 15 feet (4.6 m) of dirt and some wood planking serving as protective covering. An 1864 inspection produced a report finding that the terrain of the mountains exposed defenders of Fort Davidson to potential enfilade fire. Surrounding the fort was a 10-foot-wide (3.0 m) moat. Castel and Lause state that the moat was around 6 feet (1.8 m) deep, the NRHP form provides the depth as 7 feet (2.1 m) and Sinisi and a writer for the Missouri Archaeological Society give a depth of 8 feet (2.4 m). Fort Davidson was named for Brigadier-General John W. Davidson, who had commanded Union troops in the area in 1862.

== Battle ==
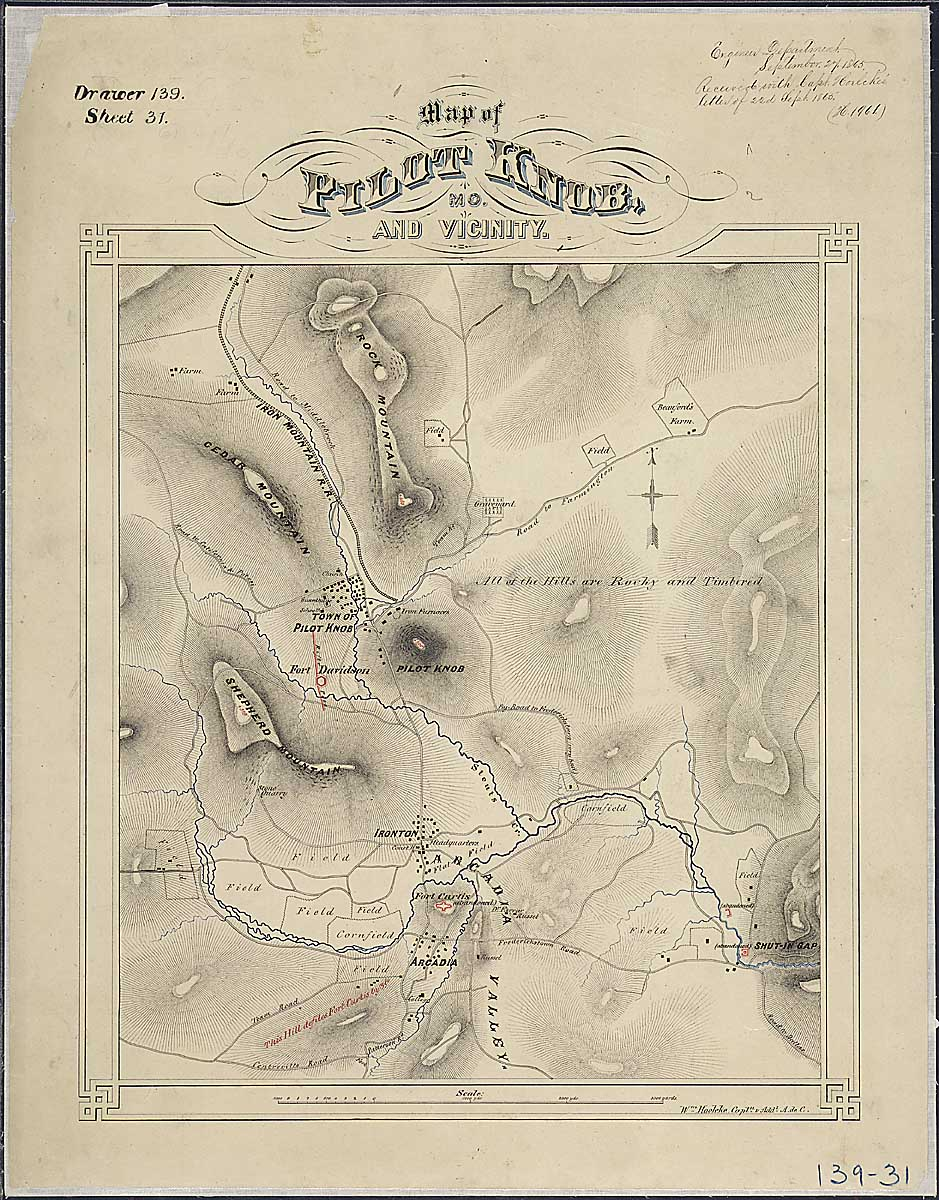
1865 map of Pilot Knob and its vicinity

By the morning of September 27, Marmaduke's men had reinforced Fagan. That morning, the combined Confederate force attacked and drove Wilson back; the Confederates were eventually able to take the ground between Shepherd Mountain and Pilot Knob. At 09:15, Union artillery from the fort drove off Confederate troops who were advancing from Ironton, but men from the 14th Iowa Infantry who had been holding a forward position came under friendly fire from both the fort and a group of 3rd MSM Cavalry troops under the command of Wilson holding Pilot Knob. This caused the Iowans to withdraw into Fort Davidson. Ewing was offered surrender terms, but declined, at least partially because he feared execution by Price's men as revenge for his issuance of General Order 11 the previous year, which had deported civilians from four Missouri counties. Confederate artillery then opened fire on Wilson's men at Pilot Knob, who withdrew into the fort. After Wilson fell back, the Confederate guns fired on Fort Davidson, but with little effect. With Wilson gone, Fagan moved men to the area between Pilot Knob and Rock Mountain, where they began pillaging houses until Union artillery fire drove them to the other side of Pilot Knob.

Meanwhile, Confederate troops began aligning for an attack. The brigades of Slemons and Colonel Thomas McCray aligned on Pilot Knob, and Brigadier-General William Cabell's brigade held the gap between Pilot Knob and Shepherd Mountain. Brigadier-General John Clark's brigade was on Shepherd Mountain, and Colonel Thomas Freeman's brigade and Slayback's battalion were north of Shepherd Mountain. Colonel Archibald Dobbins's brigade was also north of the town, in a position to block a Union retreat. Price's plan called for concurrent attacks. Historian Albert Castel placed Confederate strength in the two divisions of Marmaduke and Fagan at about 8,700 men, while the historian Kyle Sinisi estimated that Price had about 4,700 men available to attack the fort with, after detaching 20 percent of his force to hold the dismounted attackers's horses. Fagan and Marmaduke had supported the idea of a frontal attack, expecting the fort to fall quickly; Price's chief engineer had instead suggested that artillery should be placed on top of Shepherd Mountain and used to bombard Fort Davidson into submission.

To support the attack, the Confederates attempted to move four cannons, taken from Hynson's Battery and Harris's Battery, onto Shepherd Mountain, but only two of the guns were able to be moved into position due to rough terrain. In the early afternoon, Ewing sent part of the 14th Iowa Infantry forward to scout the Confederate position; it was driven back under heavy fire. Wilson was also sent on detached duty to hold the town of Pilot Knob. The two Confederate artillery pieces on the mountain attempted to shell the fort, but had little success. At about 14:00, the main Confederate attack began. The Confederate attacks would not be well coordinated, allowing Union troops to repulse them individually.

Clark's and Cabell's brigade started the attack. The right wing of Clark's brigade separated from the brigade's left, and served alongside Cabell's men. After crossing a creek bed, some of the Confederate reached as far as the fort's moat before firing. The Confederate fire had little effect, as most of it was stopped by sandbags. Fort Davidson was occupied at well over twice its designed capacity, and Ewing exploited this by having some of his men load weapons while others fired. This provided heavy fire that drove Cabell's and Clark's men back to the creek bank. Some of the Confederates, in particular the 4th and 8th Missouri Cavalry regiments, had made it no further than the creek.

When Slemons's and McCray's men attacked the fort from Pilot Knob, they captured Wilson, who was later executed by Confederate soldiers, and scattered his men. When the Confederates came under fire from the fort, they broke quickly. Wright, who was now back in regimental command, led his men alongside Cabell's, and made it most of the way to the moat before being repulsed. Later, Cabell's brigade made another charge, this time with the support of two cannons, but was again repulsed. North of the fort, Slayback's and Freeman's men finally attacked at 16:00. They detached a number of men to harass some Union wagons near Rock Mountain, before attacking the north rifle pits with the rest of their commands. The defenders of the line, men of the 3rd MSM Cavalry, eventually retreated, but the Confederates were unable to take the fort and fell back. Cabell order his brigade to make a third attack, and some of this men were able to cross the moat, before being driven off by hand grenades thrown by Union defenders. Cabell's survivors fell back beyond the creek; Clark's men abandoned the creek line after dark.

After the fighting died down, commander Alonzo Slayback sent Ewing a note that the U.S. Colored Troops within the fort would be massacred if captured. Price decided to try further attacks the next day. Believing that the moat had been the primary obstacle, Price ordered his men to spend the night building ladders to be used in crossing the moat. Meanwhile, Ewing decided to abandon the fort that night. The Union soldiers slipped past Confederate soldiers of Dobbins's brigade surrounding the fort, and a trailing group detonated Fort Davidson's magazine. The Confederates neither noticed the escape nor reacted to the explosion. Union casualties were 213. Castel placed Confederate casualties as between 800 and 1,000, while Sinisi placed Confederate casualties at around 500. Cabell's brigade lost about 10 percent of its strength.

== Aftermath ==
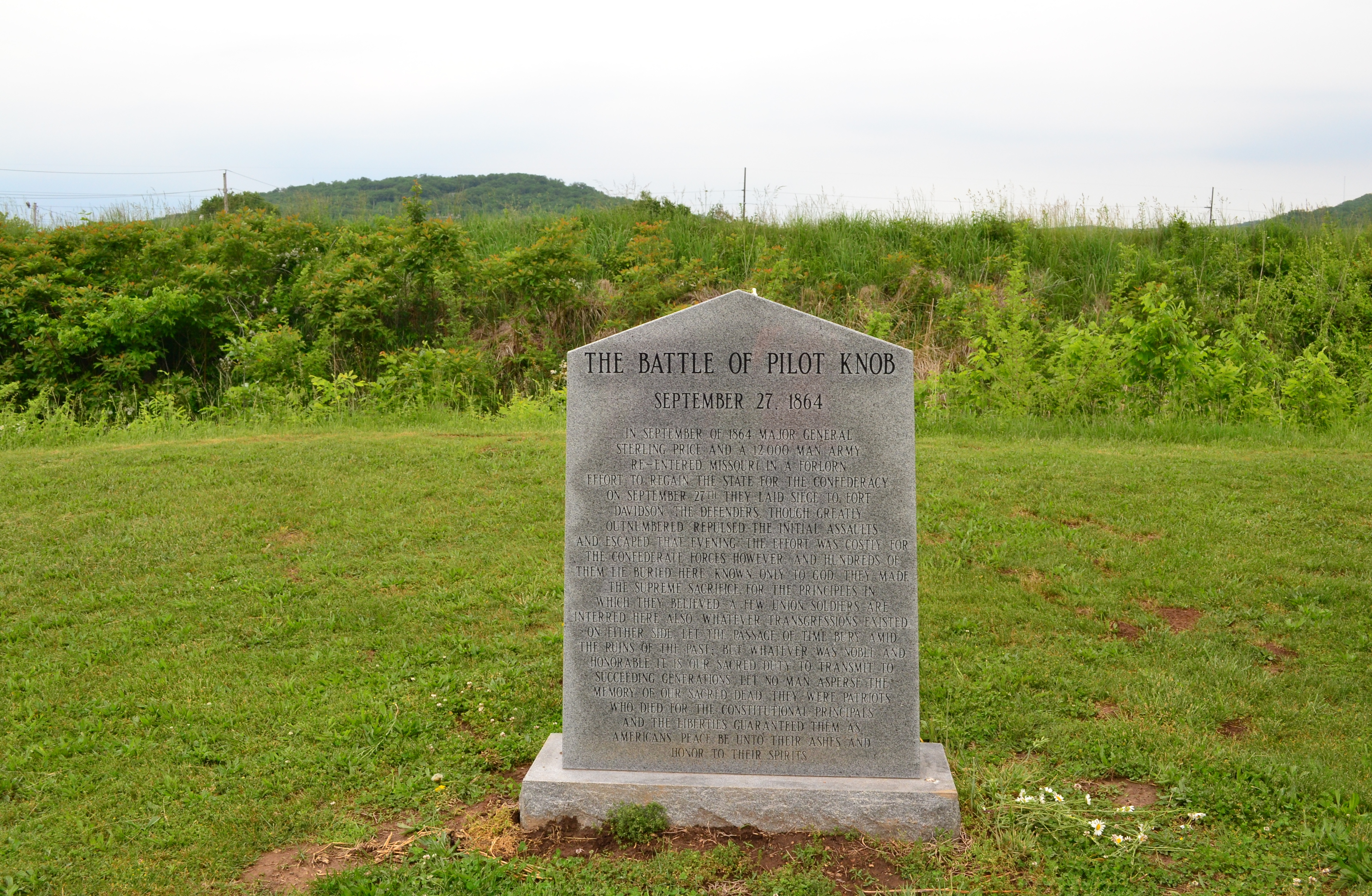
Battle of Pilot Knob Monument at the site of the fort

Ewing's survivors retreated in the direction of Rolla via Leasburg and was pursued part of the way by Shelby's and Marmaduke's men, while Price took Fagan's division north, destroying railroad depots in the process. The Confederates pursuing Ewing's men eventually broke off the pursuit and rejoined Price's main body on September 29. On October 1, Confederate troops occupied the town of Pacific, which was within 40 miles (64 km) of St. Louis. Confederate morale was depressed by the bloody attacks, which also revealed that the units of Price's army were largely of low quality. Price decided to cancel the attack against St. Louis, and instead moved westwards towards the state capital of Jefferson City.

On October 7, Price's army had reached high ground near Jefferson City. However, Price, with the failed attacks against Fort Davidson in mind, decided that the garrison of the city was too strong to attack, and instead continued moving west. With Union troops near the Kansas–Missouri state line, and more following him west, Price's army moved towards Kansas City, fighting several small actions on the way. On October 23, Price was defeated near Kansas City by a sizable Union force in the Battle of Westport. The Confederates retreated back through Kansas, suffering several further defeats along the way, including a disastrous rout at Mine Creek on October 25, in which Marmaduke and hundreds of other men were captured. Union troops pursued Price's defeated army all the way to the Arkansas; the Confederates eventually retreated all the way to Texas. During the campaign, Price had lost over two-thirds of his men.

== Legacy ==
In 1968, the Fort Davidson battlefield was added to the Missouri State Park system. The fort was further added to the National Register of Historic Places on February 26, 1970. A mass grave containing battlefield dead is marked by a granite monument, and the fort's walls, as well as the crater created when the magazine was detonated, are still visible at the site. A visitors center is located at the site, and contains a research library, a fiber optic display, and artifacts, including Ewing's sword. The American Battlefield Trust has been involved in the preservation of 41 acres (17 ha) at the site.

== See also ==
- List of American Civil War battles
- Troop engagements of the American Civil War, 1864

== Bibliography ==
- Busch, Walter E. (2011) [2010]. Fort Davidson and the Battle of Pilot Knob (ebook ed.). Charleston, South Carolina: The History Press. ISBN 978-1-61423-028-1.
- Castel, Albert (1998). "Pilot Knob, Missouri". In Kennedy, Frances H. (ed.). The Civil War Battlefield Guide (2nd ed.). Boston/New York: Houghton Mifflin. ISBN 978-0-395-74012-5.
- Collins, Charles D. Jr. (2016). Battlefield Atlas of Price's Missouri Expedition of 1864 (PDF). Fort Leavenworth, Kansas: Combat Studies Institute Press. ISBN 978-1-940804-27-9.
- Hatcher, Richard (1998). "Wilson's Creek, Missouri". In Kennedy, Frances H. (ed.). The Civil War Battlefield Guide (2nd ed.). Boston/New York: Houghton Mifflin. ISBN 978-0-395-74012-5.
- Kennedy, Frances H., ed. (1998). The Civil War Battlefield Guide (2nd ed.). Boston/New York: Houghton Mifflin. ISBN 978-0-395-74012-5.
- Lause, Mark (2011). Price's Lost Campaign: The 1864 Invasion of Missouri (ebook ed.). Columbia, Missouri: University of Missouri Press. ISBN 9780826272638.
- Martens, Richard E. (2011). "Civil War Artifacts from the Battle of Pilot Knob, Iron County, Missouri" (PDF). Missouri Archaeological Society. pp. 12–16.
- Piggott, Charla A. (December 17, 1969). "National Register of Historic Places Inventory Nomination Form" (PDF). Missouri Department of Natural Resources. Archived from the original (PDF) on May 29, 2010.
- Sinisi, Kyle S. (2020) [2015]. The Last Hurrah: Sterling Price's Missouri Expedition of 1864 (paperback ed.). Lanham, Maryland: Rowman & Littlefield. ISBN 978-1-5381-4151-9.
