= Pilot Knob (Iron County, Missouri) =

Mountain in Iron County, Missouri, United States

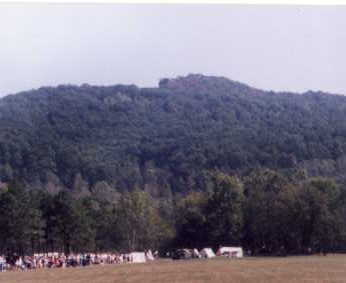
- Pilot Knob. Note distinctive summit formation. (1998)

Highest point
- Elevation: 1,470 ft (450 m)
- Coordinates: 37°37′10″N 90°37′33″W

Geography
- Location: Iron County, Missouri, U.S.
- Parent range: Saint Francois Mountains
- Topo map: USGS Lake Killarney

Pilot Knob National Wildlife Refuge
- IUCN category IV (habitat/species management area)
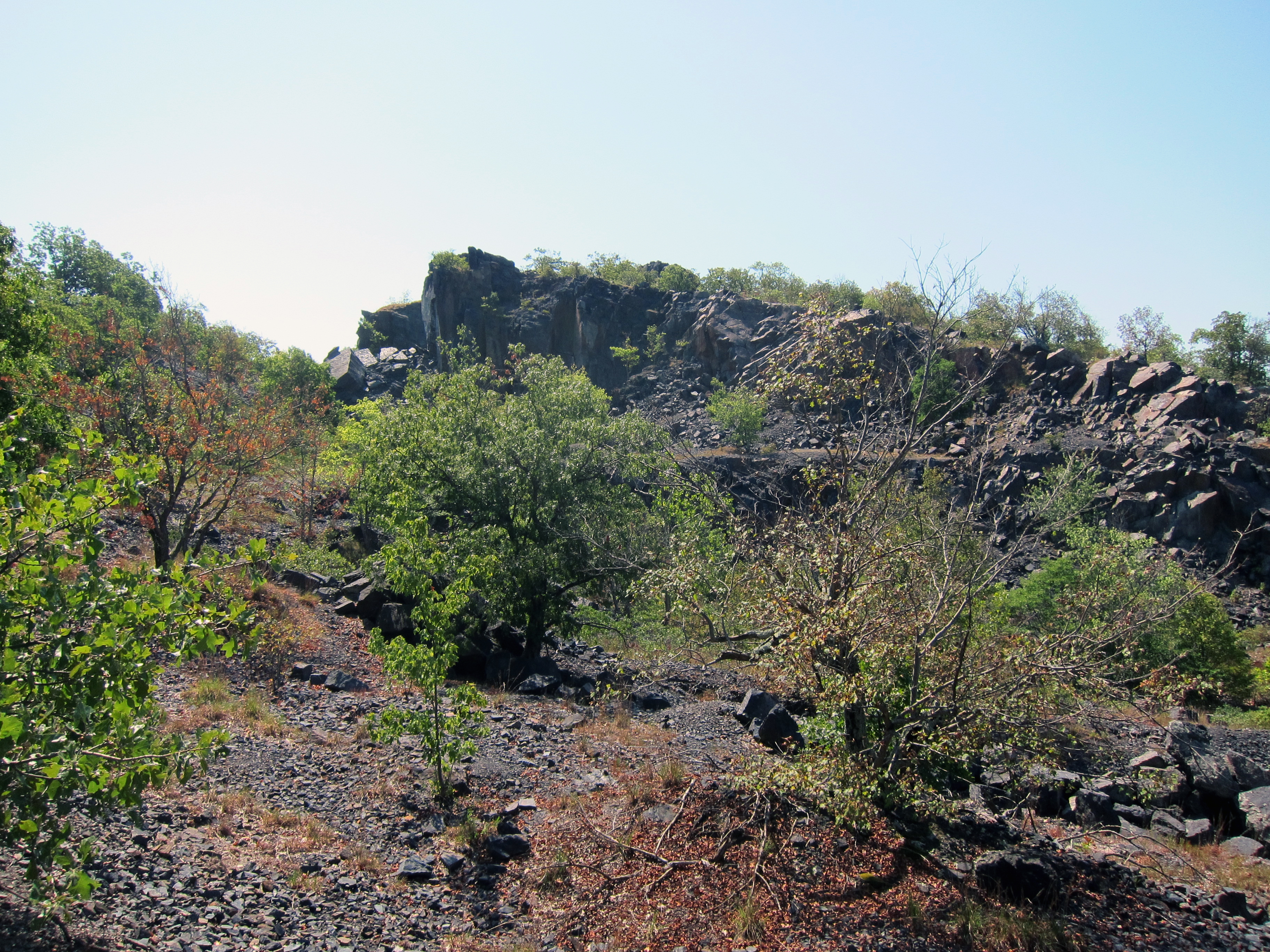
- Pilot Knob National Wildlife Refuge, July 2012

- Location within the United States
- Location: Iron County, Missouri, United States
- Area: 90 acres (0.36 km^{2})
- Established: 1987
- Governing body: U.S. Fish and Wildlife Service
- Website: Pilot Knob National Wildlife Refuge

Pilot Knob is located in the Arcadia Valley of Iron County, Missouri, between the towns of Ironton and Pilot Knob. Pilot Knob, so named because of its distinctive shape and prominent position, reaches an elevation of 1,470 feet (450 m) rising 581 feet (177 m) above the Arcadia Valley floor and has a large deposit of iron ore in its upper regions. Pilot Knob is a peak in the St. Francois Mountains.

The mountain was heavily mined in the 19th century, leaving many open mine workings. The summit of the mountain consists of the 90-acre (36 ha) Pilot Knob National Wildlife Refuge which is the home for nearly one-third of the world's population of Indiana bats. The bats hibernate in the abandoned mine workings. Pilot Knob Ore Company donated the land for conservation purposes after ceasing its mining operations on July 22, 1987. Currently the Pilot Knob National Wildlife Refuge is closed to the public to protect habitat for the endangered Indiana bat. There is an eight-foot-tall (2.44 meters) chain link fence around 40 acres (16 ha) of the land for safety reasons, keeping individuals away from the open mine shafts.

== History ==
The rock formation is approximately 1450 million years old.

Based on notes and writings of three individuals who traveled with a band of Spanish Conquistadors and explorers, the first Europeans to see the Arcadia Valley and Pilot Knob would have been Hernando DeSoto and his army as it crossed Missouri in September 1541. Specifically, the date being September 7. They reportedly crossed some mountains and came into the region where Ironton is now located. There they found a good salt spring for making of salt cakes. The next day the army's stragglers caught up to the main body where Pilot Knob is now located. The following day de Soto's band departed the area, moving towards present day Lesterville.

By 1800 members of the Algonquian peoples of Native Americans had moved into the area with a village of the Delaware Tribe established at the base of Pilot Knob. This village existed as late as 1819. In the late 1830s during the infamous forced relocation march named the Trail of Tears the Cherokee Tribe came through the valley.

The completion of the Iron Mountain Railroad all the way to the town of Pilot Knob in 1857 provided easy the transportation of iron ore mined from the Pilot Knob to the growing St. Louis. During the Civil War, with a looming invasion of Missouri by the Confederate Army under the command of General Sterling Price, the Union constructed and stationed troops at Ft. Davidson, an earth work fortification near the base of Pilot Knob in the small town of Pilot Knob. In September 1864 the invasion materialized and the Battle of Fort Davidson (also called the Battle of Pilot Knob) was fought in the valley below Pilot Knob.

During the years before Pilot Knob was closed to the public, one could hike to the top and experience a blast of cool air flowing out of one of the mine shafts nicknamed the "Devil's Icebox". In the early 20th century Easter sunrise services were held on the top of Pilot Knob.

== Sources ==
- "Pilot Knob Wildlife Refuge, U.S. Fish and Wildlife Service".
- "Summit Post.org (location)".
- "Summit Post.org (elevation)".
- "The DeSoto Chronicles". Archived from the original on July 5, 1998.
- "DeSoto's Missouri Trails".
- Conard, Howard Louis (1901). Encyclopedia of the History of Missouri (1901).
- "History of Iron County".
- Reader's Digest, (August 1987) v. 131, nos. 783–787, page 61. "19 Hours in "Devil's Icebox"" Mention of Devils Icebox
