= Arcadia Valley =

Valley in Missouri, U.S.

Coordinates: 37°36′24″N 90°37′30″W

Pilot Knob as photographed in 1876

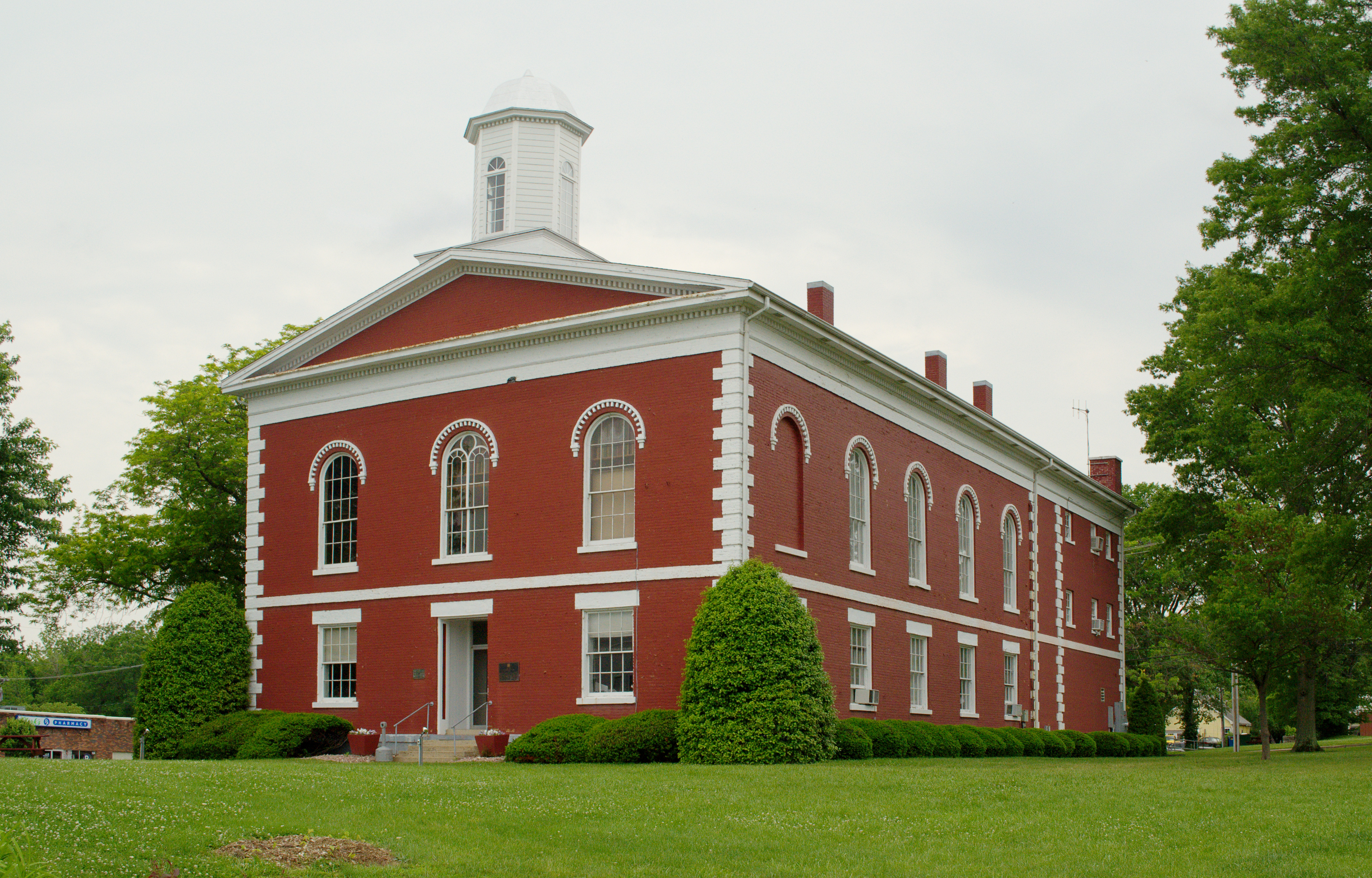
Iron County courthouse

Arcadia Valley is a valley in the St. Francois Mountains of the Ozark Plateau in Iron County, Missouri, United States. Located about 80 miles south of St. Louis, the valley includes the towns of Arcadia, Ironton and Pilot Knob, all founded in the 19th century.

Arcadia Valley has been a non-indigenous settlement for over 300 years. It became a permanent settlement as a mining community, primarily mining iron and lead ore. It is known for its graceful antebellum homes and turn-of-the-20th-century mercantile buildings, as well as the red brick Iron County courthouse. It was a popular 19th-century summer resort. In 1864, during the Civil War, the valley was the site of a significant battle at Fort Davidson in Pilot Knob.

Elephant Rocks State Park is located in the valley, and Johnson's Shut-Ins State Park and Taum Sauk State Park are nearby.

== See also ==
- Lead Belt
- John Wesley Emerson
