= Shepherd Mountain =

Mountain in Missouri, United States

- Location within Missouri

Highest point
- Elevation: 1,598 ft (487 m)
- Coordinates: 37°36′25″N 90°38′46″W

Geography
- Location: Iron County, Missouri, U.S.
- Parent range: Saint Francois Mountains
- Topo map: USGS Ironton

Shepherd Mountain is a summit in Iron County in the U.S. state of Missouri. Shepherd Mountain lies just west of Ironton and Stouts Creek in the Arcadia Valley.

Shepherd Mountain has the name of Forrest Shepherd, a geologist. The mountain was the scene of action during the Battle of Fort Davidson.

Shepherd Mountain is home to Shepherd Mountain Bike Park. A downhill mountain bike park with several trails to choose from. There are also several hiking trails.
