= Price's Lost Campaign: The 1864 Invasion of Missouri =

2011 book by Mark A. Lause

- Front cover
- Author: Mark A. Lause
- Language: English
- Subject: Price's Raid
- Genre: Non-fiction
- Publisher: University of Missouri Press
- Publication date: 2011
- Publication place: United States
- Pages: 280
- ISBN: 978-0-8262-1949-7

Price's Lost Campaign: The 1864 Invasion of Missouri is a 2011 book written by Mark A. Lause and published by the University of Missouri Press. The book discusses the early stage of Price's Raid, especially how what was originally designed as a full-fledged invasion became known to posterity as a less-important raid. Other themes include the failings of Confederate leader Sterling Price and Union leader William S. Rosecrans and a debunking of Lost Cause myths suggesting that the Confederate soldiers refrained from total war and behaved with chivalry during the campaign. The book's coverage cuts off midway through the campaign, when Price decided not to attempt to capture Jefferson City, Missouri, which Lause views as when the campaign shifted from an invasion to a raid. Several reviewers have criticized the decision to break off coverage at that point. Other points of concern mentioned by reviewers include the lack of a bibliography, insufficient quantity and quality of maps, and copy editing errors. The book was praised for its objective treatment of the campaign and the quality of Lause's research. A sequel, The Collapse of Price's Raid, was published in 2016.

== Content ==
Price's Lost Campaign was written by Mark A. Lause and published in 2011 by the University of Missouri Press. Lause is a history professor with the University of Cincinnati who has published multiple books on nineteenth-century history, focusing on the American Civil War and on working-class history in the United States. He graduated with a PhD from the University of Illinois at Chicago in 1985. His book details the early stages of Price's Raid, a late 1864 campaign during the American Civil War. Within the scope of the book are the actions that occurred from the onset of the campaign to when Sterling Price, the expedition's commander, decided to abandon an attempt to capture Jefferson City, Missouri. While the later actions of the campaign, including the important battles of Westport and Mine Creek are not significantly discussed in the book, the decision to cut off the coverage at that point was justified by Lause as being where the campaign ceased to be an invasion proper and became a raid.

Lause argues that Price's Raid was initially designed as a Confederate attempt to free Missouri from Union control and that it only later devolved into a raid. Other themes of the book include challenging the myth that the Confederates refused to engage in total war as well as examining Union Major General William S. Rosecrans' motivations behind his response to the raid. The book mentions some of the looting that occurred during the campaign, as well as the murders of civilians, including some Confederate sympathizers. Lause suggests that Rosecrans was more concerned with protecting the Missouri economy than civilians. Price is also criticized for being more concerned about his reputation than the outcome of the campaign. Ethan S. Rafuse, reviewing for Civil War Book Review stated that Price's Lost Campaign was one of the first major works written about Price's Raid since a 1964 work of limited scope titled Action Before Westport, 1864, although Patrick E. McLear, in a review for Civil War History mentioned that at least five books had been written on the subject since 1959. A timeline and order of battle are presented at the end of the book as appendixes. Lause posits that while the campaign began as an invasion, both sides recast the event as a less important raid for self-serving reasons. In 2016, Lause published The Collapse of Price's Raid, also through the University of Missouri Press, completing the story of the campaign.

== Reception ==
Professor Terry L. Beckenbaugh, reviewing the book for Annals of Iowa, stated that, while logically justifiable, the decision to end the coverage of the campaign when the Confederates abandoned their attempt on Jefferson City prevented the book from providing the complete story. He considered that the omission of the battles of Westport and Mine Creek would be "a disappointment" to some readers. He also mentioned the paucity of maps (two in the entire book) as a flaw. Beckenbaugh opined that Price's Lost Campaign was a "significant addition to the historiography of the Civil War in the [T]rans-Mississippi". Rafuse, reviewing in 2012, stated that the book was an objective treatment of the campaign. He noted that the book provides critical assessments of the failings of both Confederate commander Price and Union commander Rosecrans, as well as disproving Lost Cause myths that present a chivalric view of the Confederate army. However, he also stated that ending the coverage at Jefferson City resulted in the book being incomplete and suggested that the number of maps was insufficient. Despite its limitations, Rafuse opined that the book contained "impressive" and "compelling" levels of detail and praised Lause's ability to approach the subject objectively.

Bradley R. Clampitt, writing for the Journal of Southern History praised the book for its coverage of the Battle of Fort Davidson, as well its analysis of how the campaign, initially designed as an invasion, became known to posterity as a simple raid. However, Clampitt also criticized certain elements of the book. He argued that a single chapter about the Confederate retreat would have been sufficient to make the book feel complete if it had been added. In addition, Clampitt criticized Lause's weak prose and the number of copy editing errors present in the book, quoting two consecutive ungrammatical sentences. When reviewing Price's Lost Campaign for Kansas History, Professor William Garrett Piston viewed Lause's treatment of the later events of the campaign as adequate, but stated that an epilogue discussing how the campaign was remembered in posterity was lacking. While Piston praised the book's research, he also noted the lack of a bibliography and stated that the footnotes were written in such a way that it was difficult to trace quotes back to individual sources. He also criticized both the quantity and quality of the book's maps, stating that not only were there too few maps, but that they were low-quality copies of maps that dated to the 19th century. Overall, Piston described Price's Lost Campaign as "well-written" and "an important contribution to studies of the Civil War in the Trans-Mississippi".

Alex Mendoza reviewed the book for America's Civil War and stated that there was much that could be learned from Price's Lost Campaign and that it was "thoroughly researched and well-written" despite the fact that only two maps, taken from the Official Records of the War of the Rebellion, were included. McLear described the book as "an excellent account" about difficult subject matter. He also praised the intricacy of Price's Lost Campaign in analyzing the motivations of leaders on both sides. Overall, McLear stated that, unless new primary source material unexpectedly emerges, that Price's Lost Campaign would be "the standard work on Price's invasion of Missouri".

== Sources ==
- Anderson, Kristen (2017). "The Collapse of Price's Raid: The Beginning of the End in Civil War Missouri (review)". Journal of Southern History. 83 (2): 435–436. doi:10.1353/soh.2017.0117. ISSN 2325-6893. S2CID 159653285.
- Beckenbaugh, Terry L. (2012). "Price's Lost Campaign: The 1864 Invasion of Missouri". Annals of Iowa. 71 (2). State Historical Society of Iowa: 180–181. doi:10.17077/0003-4827.1626. ISSN 0003-4827.
- Clampitt, Bradley R. (2013). "Price's Lost Campaign: The 1864 Invasion of Missouri". Journal of Southern History. 79 (2): 497–498. ISSN 0022-4642.
- McLear, Patric E. (2013). "Price's Lost Campaign: The 1864 Invasion of Missouri by Mark A. Lause (review)". Civil War History. 59 (1): 116–118. doi:10.1353/cwh.2013.0006.
- Mendoza, Alex (2012). "Price's Lost Campaign: The 1864 Invasion of Missouri". America's Civil War. 25 (3): 65. ISSN 1046-2899. ProQuest 1014185000.
- Piston, William Garrett (2012). "Price's Lost Campaign: The 1864 Invasion of Missouri". Kansas History. 35 (2). Kansas Historical Society: 141. ISSN 0149-9114.
- Rafuse, Ethan S. (2012). "Price's Lost Campaign: The 1864 Invasion of Missouri". Civil War Book Review. 14 (1). Louisiana State University Libraries. doi:10.31390/cwbr.14.1.13.
