= Battle of Pine Bluff =

1863 battle of the American Civil War

- Part of the American Civil War
Date	October 25, 1863 (163 years ago)
Location	Pine Bluff, Arkansas 34°13′47″N 92°00′12″W
Result	Union victory

Belligerents
United States (Union)	Confederate States

Commanders and leaders
(United States) Powell Clayton	(Confederate States of America) John S. Marmaduke

Units involved
Post of Pine Bluff	Marmaduke's Division

Strength
550 cavalry and militia, 300 freedmen, 9 guns	2,000 cavalry, 12 guns

Casualties and losses
16 dead and 40 wounded or missing	41 dead, wounded or missing
- Location in Arkansas

The Battle of Pine Bluff was fought on October 25, 1863, in Pine Bluff, Arkansas, during the American Civil War. The Post of Pine Bluff, a U.S. garrison commanded by Colonel Powell Clayton, successfully defended the town against attacks led by Confederate Brigadier-General John S. Marmaduke's cavalry division. Much of the fighting took place near the Jefferson Court House, which the Confederates tried unsuccessfully to set ablaze. The Union victory ensured Pine Bluff was occupied by Federal troops until the end of the Civil War.

== Background ==
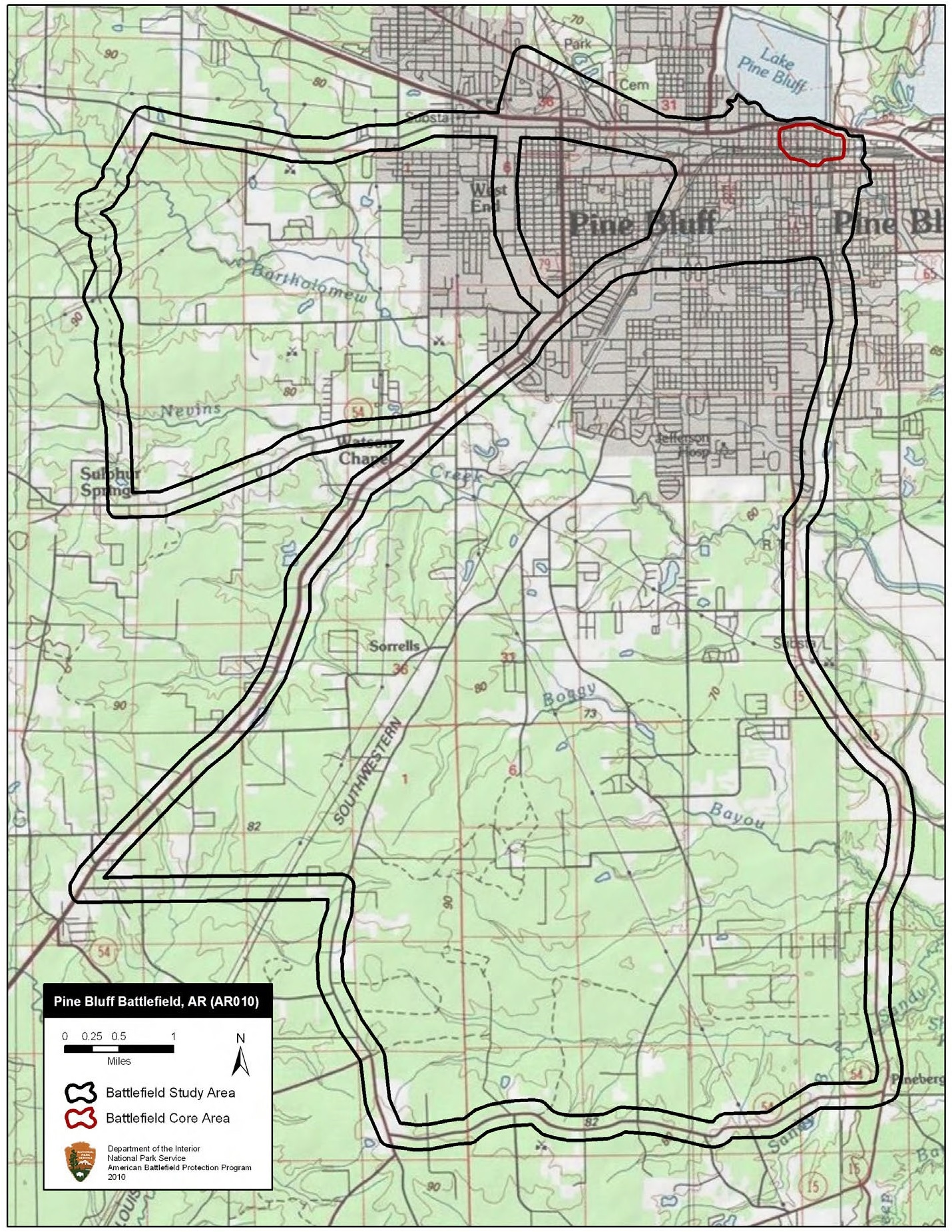
Map of Pine Bluff Battlefield core and study areas by the American Battlefield Protection Program.

After the capture of Little Rock on September 10, 1863, Federal troops occupied several towns along the Arkansas. Confederate Brigadier-General John S. Marmaduke, commanding a cavalry division, decided to test their strength at Pine Bluff. On Sunday, October 25, Marmaduke attacked the Post of Pine Bluff, a U.S. garrison commanded by Colonel Powell Clayton of the 5th Kansas Cavalry.

== Battle ==
At 8 a.m., Marmaduke's 2,000 Confederate cavalry approached Pine Bluff from three sides. The 550 federal cavalrymen and Missouri militia, supported by 300 freedmen, barricaded the court house square with cotton-bales and positioned the cannon to command the adjacent streets. Marmaduke's Division made several attacks upon the square, then attempted to set the county court house on fire. They were unsuccessful and withdrew to Princeton, Arkansas.

== See also ==
- List of American Civil War battles
- List of battles 1801–1900
- Troop engagements of the American Civil War, 1863
