= Albert E. Castel =

American historian (1928–2014)

- Born: November 11, 1928; Wichita, Kansas, U.S.
- Died: November 14, 2014 (aged 86); Columbus, Ohio, U.S.
- Education: University of Chicago (PhD)
- Occupations: Historian, author

Albert E. Castel (November 11, 1928 – November 14, 2014) was an American historian and author.

He specialized in Civil War history and historiography.

== Life ==
He was born on November 11, 1928, in Wichita, Kansas.

He obtained a bachelor's and master's degree from Wichita State University in 1950 and 1951, respectively. In 1955, he earned a PhD from the University of Chicago. His dissertation, entitled A Frontier State at War: Kansas, 1861-1865, won honorable mention in the American Historical Association's Albert J. Beveridge Competition, after which it was published in 1958 as a monograph by Cornell University Press. From 1960 to 1991, he taught history at the Western Michigan University .

He died on November 14, 2014, in Columbus, Ohio.

== Awards ==
He won the Lincoln Prize for Best Civil War book in 1992 for his book Decision in the West.

== Bibliography ==
- 1958. A Frontier State at War: Kansas, 1861–1865. Ithaca, NY: Cornell University Press (Reprint: Lawrence, KS: Kansas Heritage Press, 1992).
- 1962. William Clarke Quantrill: His Life and Times. New York City: Frederick Fell Publishers, Inc. (Reissued: Norman, OK: University of Oklahoma Press, 1999).
- 1968. General Sterling Price and the Civil War in the West. Baton Rouge, LA: Louisiana State University Press (Reissued, 1993).
- 1979. The Presidency of Andrew Johnson. Lawrence, KS: Regents Press of Kansas.
- 1992. Decision in the West: The Atlanta Campaign of 1864. Lawrence, KS: University Press of Kansas.
- 1996. Winning and Losing the Civil War. Columbia, SC: University of South Carolina Press.
- 1997. Civil War Kansas: Reaping the Whirlwind. Lawrence, KS: University Press of Kansas.
- 1998. Bloody Bill Anderson: The Short, Savage Life of a Civil War Guerrilla (with Tom Goodrich). Mechanicsburg, PA: Stackpole Books (Reissued: Lawrence, KS: University Press of Kansas, 2006).
- 2001. Articles of War: Winners, Losers, (and Some Who Were Both) During the Civil War. Mechanicsburg, PA: Stackpole Books.
- 2011. Victors in Blue: How Union Generals Fought the Confederates, Battled Each Other, and Won the Civil War. Lawrence, KS: University Press of Kansas.
