= Pilot Knob, Missouri =

City in Iron County, Missouri, United States

- City
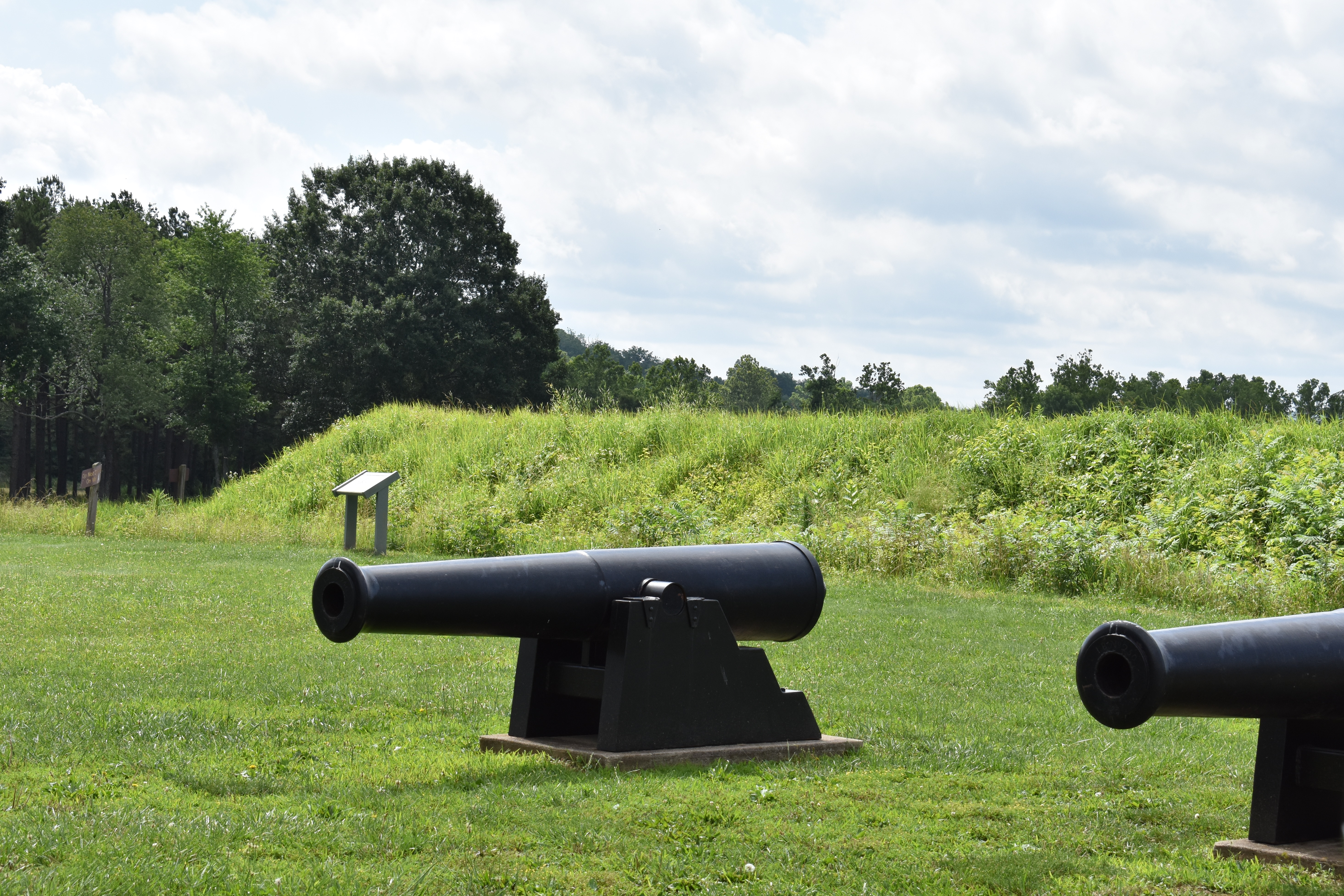
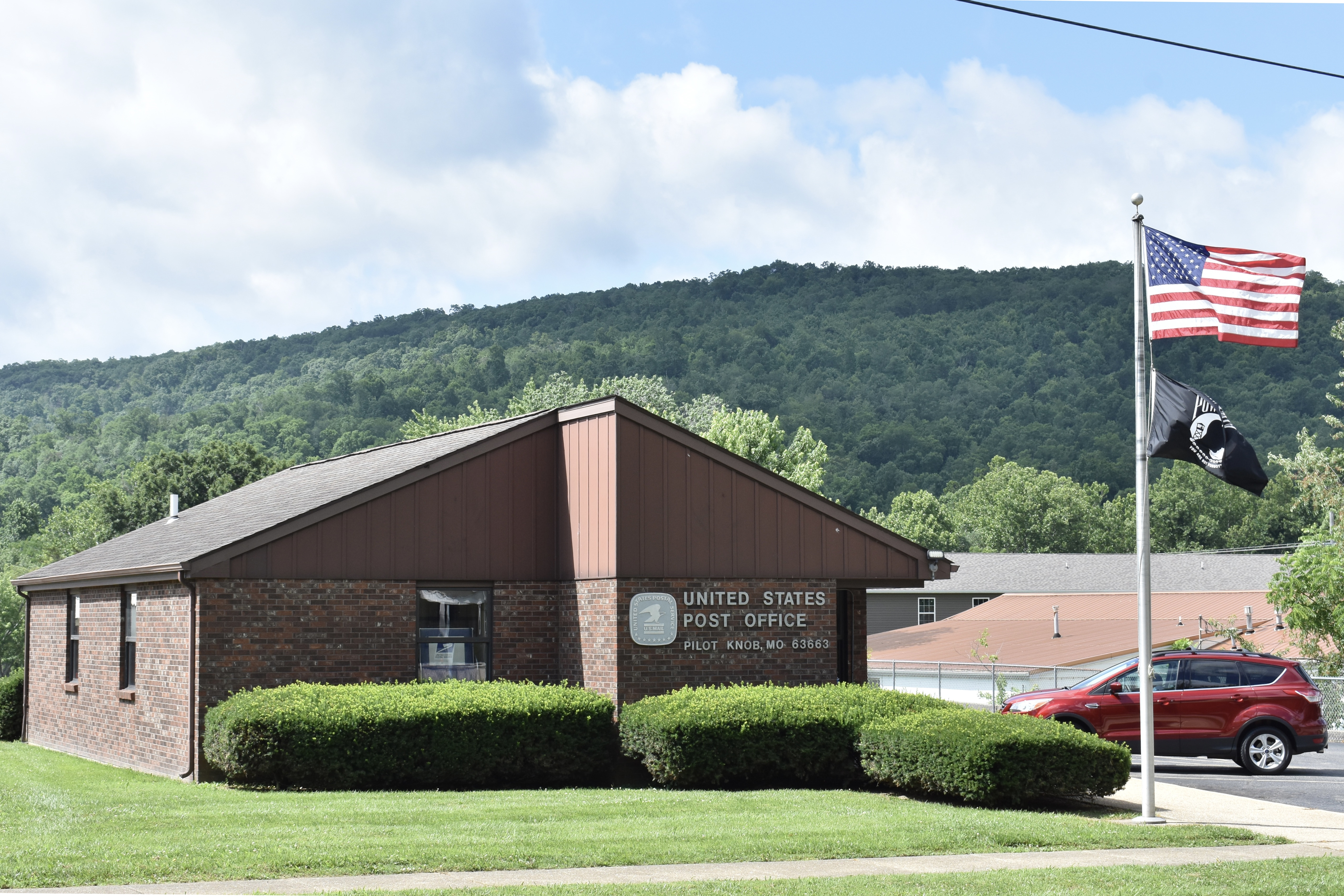
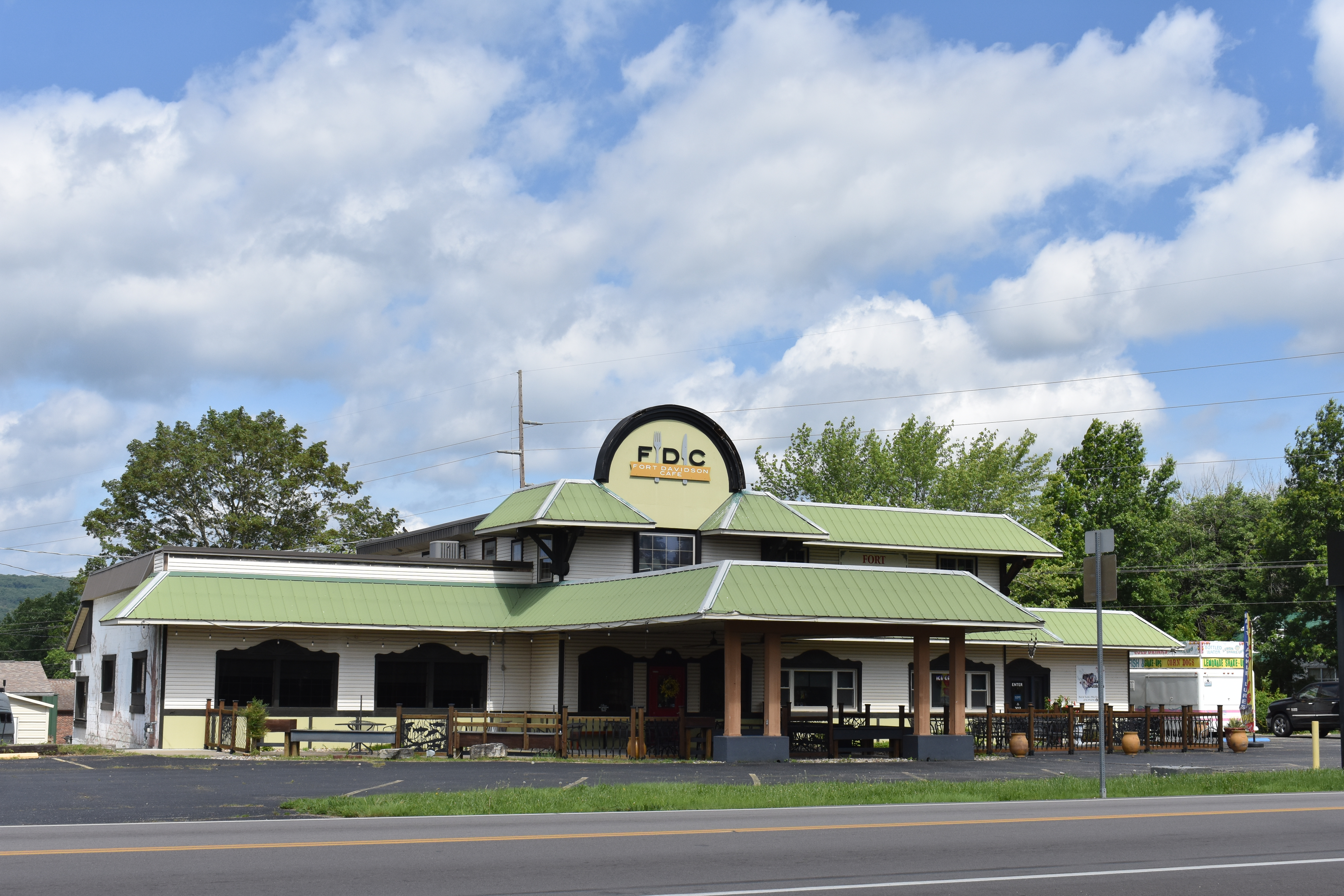
- Battle of Pilot Knob State Historic Site Post Office Fort Davidson Hotel

- Location of Pilot Knob, Missouri
- Coordinates: 37°37′25″N 90°38′44″W
- Country: United States
- State: Missouri
- County: Iron

Area
  - Total: 0.90 sq mi (2.32 km^{2})
  - Land: 0.90 sq mi (2.32 km^{2})
  - Water: 0.0039 sq mi (0.01 km^{2})
- Elevation: 965 ft (294 m)

Population (2020)
  - Total: 671
  - Density: 750.7/sq mi (289.84/km^{2})
- Time zone: UTC-6 (Central (CST))
  - Summer (DST): UTC-5 (CDT)
- ZIP code: 63663
- Area code: 573
- FIPS code: 29-57656
- GNIS feature ID: 2396205

Pilot Knob is a city in northeast Iron County, Missouri, United States. The population was 671 at the 2020 census. It lies eighteen miles (29 km) south-east of Belgrade and twenty-seven miles (43 km) north-east of Centerville.

== History ==
Pilot Knob was platted in 1858. The city was named after the Pilot Knob mountain nearby, which served as a navigational landmark or "pilot" to hunters and travelers. A post office called Pilot Knob has been in operation since 1858.

The Battle of Pilot Knob in the fall of 1864 was a notable clash in the area during the Civil War. A museum near the battle site is dedicated to this event.

== Geography ==
Pilot Knob is located on Missouri Route 21 approximately one and a half miles (2.4 km) north-northeast of Ironton and three miles (5 km) southeast of Elephant Rocks State Park.

According to the United States Census Bureau, the city has a total area of 0.90 square miles (2.33 km^{2}), of which 0.89 square miles (2.31 km^{2}) is land and 0.01 square miles (0.03 km^{2}) is water.

== Demographics ==
Historical population
| Census | Pop. | Note | %± |
|---|---|---|---|
| 1860 | 302 | | — |
| 1870 | 581 | | 92.4% |
| 1880 | 1,359 | | 133.9% |
| 1890 | 757 | | −44.3% |
| 1950 | 582 | | — |
| 1960 | 524 | | −10.0% |
| 1970 | 582 | | 11.1% |
| 1980 | 722 | | 24.1% |
| 1990 | 783 | | 8.4% |
| 2000 | 697 | | −11.0% |
| 2010 | 746 | | 7.0% |
| 2020 | 671 | | −10.1% |
U.S. Decennial Census 2020

=== 2010 census ===
As of the census of 2010, there were 746 people, 335 households, and 195 families living in the city. The population density was 838.2 inhabitants per square mile (323.6/km^{2}). There were 392 housing units at an average density of 440.4 per square mile (170.0/km^{2}). The racial makeup of the city was 94.37% White, 1.34% Black or African American, 1.47% Native American, 0.40% Asian, and 2.41% from two or more races. Hispanic or Latino of any race were 1.61% of the population.

There were 335 households, of which 29.3% had children under the age of 18 living with them, 38.8% were married couples living together, 15.2% had a female householder with no husband present, 4.2% had a male householder with no wife present, and 41.8% were non-families. 35.8% of all households were made up of individuals, and 16.7% had someone living alone who was 65 years of age or older. The average household size was 2.23 and the average family size was 2.83.

The median age in the city was 39.9 years. 24.1% of residents were under the age of 18; 8.4% were between the ages of 18 and 24; 22.7% were from 25 to 44; 24.1% were from 45 to 64; and 20.6% were 65 years of age or older. The gender makeup of the city was 46.4% male and 53.6% female.

=== 2000 census ===
As of the census of 2000, there were 697 people, 283 households, and 189 families living in the city. The population density was 803.7 inhabitants per square mile (310.3/km^{2}). There were 326 housing units at an average density of 375.9 per square mile (145.1/km^{2}). The racial makeup of the city was 91.97% White, 5.88% African American, 0.29% Native American, 0.57% Asian, 0.86% from other races, and 0.43% from two or more races. Hispanic or Latino of any race were 1.72% of the population.

There were 283 households, out of which 31.4% had children under the age of 18 living with them, 48.1% were married couples living together, 12.0% had a female householder with no husband present, and 32.9% were non-families. 28.6% of all households were made up of individuals, and 8.8% had someone living alone who was 65 years of age or older. The average household size was 2.40 and the average family size was 2.92.

In the city, the population was spread out, with 27.3% under the age of 18, 9.8% from 18 to 24, 26.1% from 25 to 44, 22.4% from 45 to 64, and 14.5% who were 65 years of age or older. The median age was 36 years. For every 100 females, there were 90.4 males. For every 100 females age 18 and over, there were 87.1 males.

The median income for a household in the city was $19,702, and the median income for a family was $22,794. Males had a median income of $22,344 versus $16,691 for females. The per capita income for the city was $12,487. About 20.1% of families and 27.0% of the population were below the poverty line, including 46.3% of those under age 18 and 10.5% of those age 65 or over.

== See also ==
- List of cities in Missouri
