= National Register of Historic Places listings in Linn County, Kansas =

Location of Linn County in Kansas

There are nine properties listed on the National Register of Historic Places (NRHP) in Linn County, Kansas.

Two of the sites are the location of historic events. The Marais des Cygnes Massacre Site is the location of the Marais des Cygnes massacre, an 1858 event during Bleeding Kansas in which pro-slavery advocates kidnapped 11 anti-slavery settlers, killing five of them. John Brown temporarily used the site as a fort, and the property was listed on the NRHP in 1971. The Battle of Mine Creek Site preserves the location of the Battle of Mine Creek, which was fought in 1864 as part of Price's Raid during the American Civil War. Confederate general Sterling Price's army was retreating after being defeated at the Battle of Westport and was attacked by pursuing Union troops. Price's Confederate lost heavily in men and supplies. The site was added to the NRHP in 1973.

Another two sites are bridges. The Landers Creek Bridge is a stone arch bridge built in 1917. It was listed on the NRHP in 1985. The Mine Creek Bridge was designed by James B. Marsh and constructed in 1927. It is 110 feet (34 m) long and was added to the NRHP in 1983. Two historic schools in Prescott, Kansas, are also on the register. The Prescott School was built in 1882 and 1883 and was supplemented by the construction of the Prescott Rural High School in 1924. After the high school was built, the older building was only used as an elementary school. A school district consolidation occurred in 1972, and the high school students were sent to Mound City, Kansas, for education; the high school building was then used as the elementary school and the former elementary school became a library. In 2006, the elementary school was closed and became Prescott's city hall. The Prescott School was added to the NRHP in 1982 and the Prescott Rural High School in 2008.

The Linn County Courthouse entered use in 1887 and is the second-oldest operational courthouse in the state of Kansas. The building was designed by George Ropes and was listed on the NRHP in 1974. Land for the Old Linn County Jail was purchased in 1867, and the building was completed the next year; it was probably the first publicly-constructed building in Linn County. After a new jail was built, the building was sold to the city of Mound City in 1903 for use as a city hall. The building is still being used for governmental purposes.

This National Park Service list is complete through NPS recent listings posted November 13, 2026.

== Current listings ==
	Name on the Register	Image	Date listed	Location	City or town	Description
1	Battle of Mine Creek Site		December 12, 1973 (#73000762)	20485 Kansas Highway 52, Pleasonton, Kansas; 38°08′06″N 94°43′28″W	Pleasanton	Site of the Battle of Mine Creek, which was fought on October 25, 1864, during the American Civil War. Sterling Price's Confederate army was retreating after being defeated at the Battle of Westport and halted at the crossing of Mine Creek as the column's wagon train negotiated the crossing. Union troops attacked and routed Price's army, capturing supplies and many Confederate soldiers. The site is currently preserved as the Mine Creek Battlefield State Historic Site, which contains a visitor center and an interpretive trail.
2	Hugh M. and Rachel A. Brook House		April 1, 2025 (#100011615)	604 East Kansas Avenue; 38°05′20″N 95°00′18″W	Blue Mound	
3	Landers Creek Bridge	Landers Creek Bridge	July 2, 1985 (#85001430)	Southern edge of Goodrich; 38°16′50″N 94°59′30″W	Goodrich	Also known as the Goodrich Bridge. The bridge was built in 1917 by an unknown builder. It is a stone arch bridge, and was described as a "transitional design" in its National Register of Historic Places nomination form, as it was built with both stone and concrete. It consists of five arches between concrete abutments with a spandrel wall serving as a guardrail over the middle three arches. Wing walls have been constructed along the approaches to the bridge to provide erosion control. Part of the Masonry Arch Bridges of Kansas Multiple Property Submission.
4	Linn County Courthouse	Linn County Courthouse	July 15, 1974 (#74000842)	315 Main Street, Mound City, Kansas; 38°08′31″N 94°48′37″W	Mound City	The Linn County Courthouse is the second-oldest courthouse in Kansas that is still operational. Construction for the courthouse began in the summer of 1885 and entered use on January 1, 1887, although the structure was not completed until later that year. George Ropes, a prominent architect of the era, designed the building. The exterior walls are made out of brick, and the building is 110 feet (34 m) long, 60 feet (18 m) wide, and 65 feet (20 m) tall. While some of the building's features have been altered, it is still considered to be in good condition. The building is still used for services such as driver's license renewals and farm permits.
5	Marais des Cygnes Massacre Site	Marais des Cygnes Massacre Site	June 21, 1971 (#71000317)	26426 E 1700th Rd, Pleasonton, Kansas; 38°16′52″N 94°37′12″W	Trading Post	On May 19, 1858, during Bleeding Kansas, the Marais des Cygnes massacre occurred when pro-slavery advocate kidnapped 11 anti-slavery settlers at Trading Post before shooting 10 of them, five fatally. Men of the 3rd Iowa Cavalry Regiment established informal monuments at the site in 1864, and a formal monument was erected in 1889. John Brown occupied the area as a fort in the summer of 1858, and Brown's friend Charles Hadsall built a house on the site, likely in the 1870s. In 1941, the site became a Kansas state park. In addition to the National Register of Historic Places listing, the site was further listed as a National Historic Landmark in 1974.
6	Mine Creek Bridge	Mine Creek Bridge	March 10, 1983 (#83000430)	6 miles (9.7 km) east and 0.5 miles (0.80 km) south of Mound City; 38°08′29″N 94°41′42″W	Mound City	The Mine Creek Bridge is 110 feet (34 m) long and is in the Marsh arch (also known as rainbow arch) style. The footings of the bridge are 22 feet (6.7 m) below the road grade and the low water level is 16 feet (4.9 m) below the grade. The bridge was designed by James B. Marsh. The construction bids were opened on March 31, 1927, and the bridge was completed on October 9 of the same year. The bridge received less traffic after U.S. Route 69 was rerouted. The bridge is on Ungeheuer Road. It was part of the Rainbow Arch Bridges of Kansas Multiple Property Submission, although objections were raised by the Linn County Commission at the time of the nomination.
7	Old Linn County Jail		November 30, 1978 (#78001285)	312 Main St. 38°08′34″N 94°48′37″W	Mound City	Despite being formed in 1855, Linn County did not have a courthouse or jail as late as 1867. The costs of transporting prisoners to Lawrence became high enough that Linn County purchased land to build a jail in the county seat of Mound City on April 15, 1867. Alfred Babb designed the jail, and Ezekial Bunn provided construction. The building was completed in 1868; The Wichita Eagle wrote in 1978 that it was probably the first publicly-funded building construction in Linn County. Linn County later constructed a new jail, and the old building was sold to the city of Mound City in January 1903. The city used the building as its city hall, and a barber shop was located in it for a time. The Old Linn County Jail is two stories tall, and has dimensions of 27 feet (8.2 m) by 34 feet (10 m). In the 1960s, a garage was added to the building. It is still used for government purposes.
8	Prescott School	Prescott School	May 6, 1982 (#82002664)	3rd and Main Sts. 38°03′55″N 94°41′55″W	Prescott	Built from 1882 to 1883, the Prescott School was one of 99 schoolhouses in Linn County when first constructed. Of the 99, only the Prescott School and one other one were made of brick. In 1924, a new high school was constructed in Prescott, and the old building was only used as an elementary school. After the high school was consolidated with the Mound City school district in 1972, the elementary school was moved to the 1924 building. Prescott established a city library and housed it in the Prescott School, beginning in 1974. It is still used for the library. The building is two stories tall, and has a 55 feet (17 m) by 30 feet (9.1 m) foundation made from limestone. Each floor is divided into two rooms, and a cupola containing a bell is located on top of the building. Electrical wiring was added in 1924 and gas heating in 1956. During the 1950s, two rural schoolhouse were moved to the site and connected to the building, but were removed in 1974.
9	Prescott Rural High School	Prescott Rural High School	July 3, 2008 (#08000610)	202 West 4th St. 38°03′54″N 94°41′59″W	Prescott	In 1923, the citizens of Prescott, Kansas, began discussing the construction of a high school to supplement the existing Prescott School. Plans for the building had been developed by 1924 and were similar to existing schools in Hepler and Arcadia. Former Kansas State Architect Ray Gamble designed the building, which was completed in 1924 and entered use on January 14, 1925. In 1972, the local high school students began being sent to Mound City, and the Prescott Rural High School building was used as an elementary school. In 2006, the Jayhawk Unified School District closed the elementary school, and the city of Prescott took over the building for use as a city hall. The building represents the Commercial style and contains elements of Mission Revival and Spanish Revival architecture. The building has dimensions of 108 feet (33 m) by 96 feet (29 m) and is primarily one story tall, although the school's gymnasium is taller. The original outer walls are made of brick, and additions dating to the 1950s and 1960s are located at the northwestern and southwestern corners of the building. It was part of the Historic Public Schools of Kansas Multiple Property Submission.

== See also ==
- List of National Historic Landmarks in Kansas
- National Register of Historic Places listings in Kansas
