= Prescott =

Prescott may refer to:

== People ==
- Prescott (given name)
- Prescott (surname)

== Places ==
=== Canada ===
- Prescott, Ontario, a town
- Prescott County, Ontario, in existence from 1800 to 1820
- Prescott Island, Nunavut
- Cape Prescott, Nunavut

=== England ===
- Prescott, Gloucestershire, a settlement and civil parish
- Prescott Channel, West Ham, a canal
  - Three Mills Lock, also known as Prescott Lock, a lock on the channel

=== United States ===
- Prescott, Alabama, an unincorporated community
- Prescott, Arizona, a city and county seat
  - Prescott National Forest, near the city
- Prescott, Arkansas, a city
- Prescott, Oakland, California, a residential neighborhood and commercial district
- Prescott, Indiana, an unincorporated community
- Prescott, Iowa, a city
- Prescott Township, Adams County, Iowa
- Prescott, Kansas, a city
- Prescott, Massachusetts, a town
- Prescott, Michigan, a village
- Prescott, Missouri, an unincorporated community
- Prescott Township, Renville County, North Dakota, in Renville County, North Dakota
- Prescott, Oregon, a city
- Prescott Township, Minnesota
- Prescott, Washington, a city
- Prescott, Wisconsin, a city
- Prescott Creek, a creek in New Jersey
- Prescott National Cemetery, Prescott, Arizona

== Schools ==
- Prescott College, Arizona, United States, a private college
- Prescott High School (disambiguation), three American schools
- Prescott Elementary School (disambiguation), various American schools
- Prescott School, Prescott, Kansas, a former school on the National Register of Historic Places
- Prescott Schools, Adelaide, Australia, a collection of independent Seventh-day Adventist co-educational primary and secondary day schools

== Other uses ==
- Prescott baronets, two titles, one extant
- HMCS Prescott, a Royal Canadian Navy corvette during the Second World War
- Prescott Automobile Manufacturing Company, an automobile manufacturer in Passaic, New Jersey, from 1901 to 1905
- Prescott Commons, a historic building on the campus of Rocky Mountain College, Billings, Montana
- Prescott Group, a fictional company and its eponymous subsidiaries, created by Stephen Colbert
- Prescott Observatory, Arizona
- Prescott Speed Hill Climb, a motorsport event in Gloucestershire, England
- Prescott station, Prescott, Arkansas, a former Prescott and Northwestern Railroad station on the National Register of Historic Places
- Intel Prescott, a revised version of the Pentium 4 'Netburst' CPU core introduced in 2004

== See also ==
- Prescott and Northwestern Railroad, in Arkansas, US
- Prescott Drawbridge, connecting Prescott, Wisconsin, and Denmark Township, Minnesota
- Prescott House (disambiguation)
- Prescott Town House, a historic former town hall in Petersham, Massachusetts, on the National Register of Historic Places
- Prescott Park (disambiguation)
- Prescot Street, a street in Whitechapel in the London Borough of Tower Hamlets, formerly known as Great Prescott Street, adjoining Little Prescott Street
- Prescot, a town in Merseyside, England
