= Battle of Mine Creek order of battle =

The order of battle for the Battle of Mine Creek includes:

- Battle of Mine Creek order of battle: Confederate
- Battle of Mine Creek order of battle: Union
