= Priscott =

Priscott is a surname. Notable people with the surname include:

- Tony Priscott (1941–2023), English footballer
- Stuart Priscott (born 1971), English cricketer

== See also ==
- Prescott (disambiguation)
