= Landers Creek Bridge =

- U.S. National Register of Historic Places
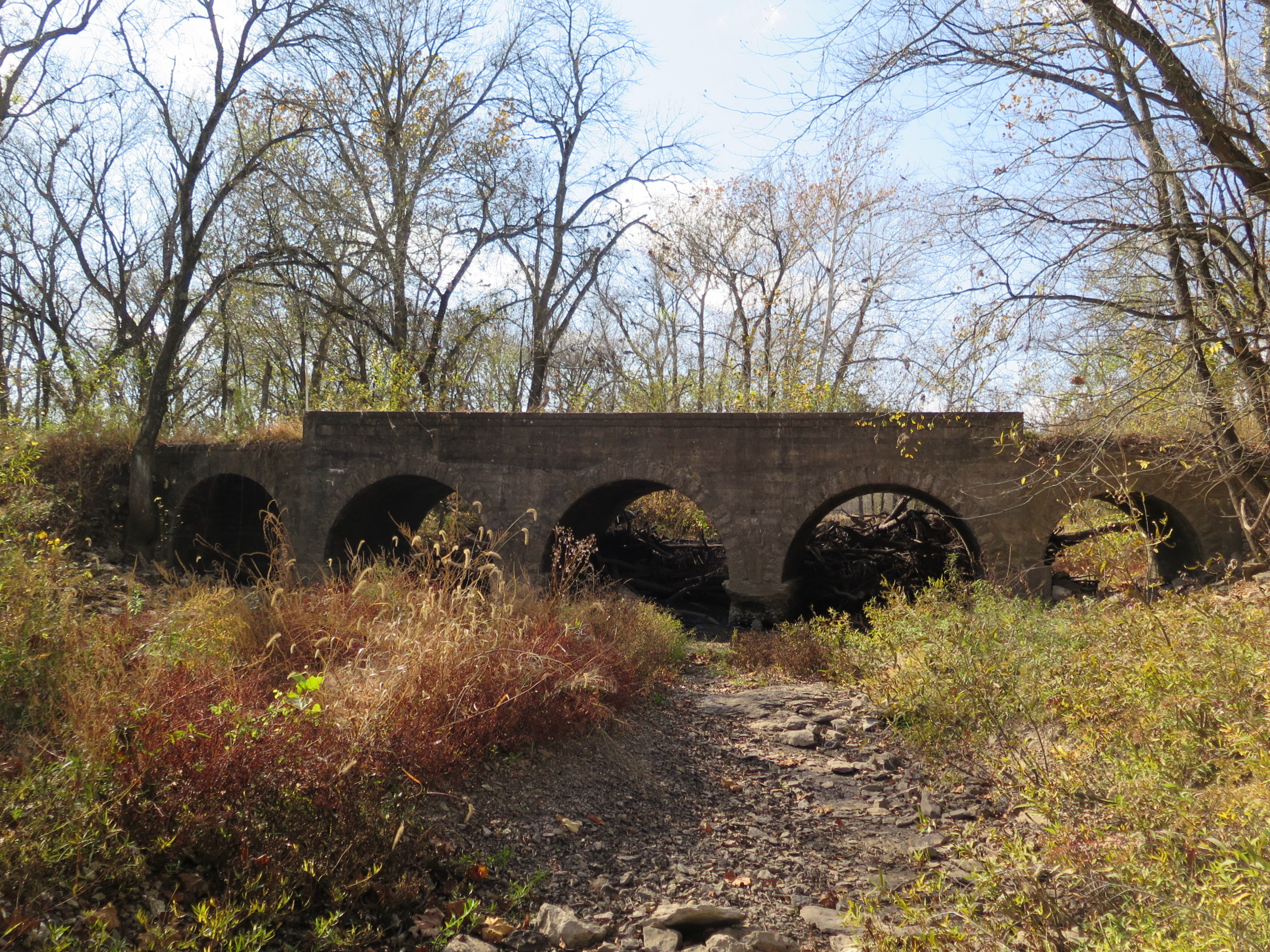

- Location within Kansas Location within the United States
- Location: Southern edge of Goodrich, Kansas
- Coordinates: 38.280556°N 94.991667°W
- Area: less than one acre
- Built: 1917
- Architectural style: Stone Arch
- MPS: Masonry Arch Bridges of Kansas TR
- NRHP reference No.: 85001430
- Added to NRHP: July 2, 1985

The Landers Creek Bridge, also known as the Goodrich Bridge and located at the southern edge of Goodrich in Linn County, Kansas, is a stone arch bridge built in 1917. It was listed on the National Register of Historic Places in 1985.

The bridge design reflects the transition of materials: it uses stone voussoirs, concrete piers, and concrete spandrel walls. It has five stone arches and is 82 feet (25 m) long with a 14 feet (4.3 m) roadway (from curb to curb). The roadway is 14 feet (4.3 m) above Landers Creek. Small limestone wing walls were added later.
