= Mine Creek Battlefield State Historic Site =

- Battle of Mine Creek Site
- U.S. National Register of Historic Places
- Location within Kansas Location within the United States
- Nearest city: Pleasanton, Kansas
- Coordinates: 38°08′27″N 94°43′52″W
- Area: 180 acres (0.73 km^{2})
- Built: 1864
- NRHP reference No.: 73000762
- Added to NRHP: December 12, 1973

The Mine Creek Battlefield State Historic Site, located 2.5 miles (4.0 km) southwest of Pleasanton in eastern Kansas, United States, commemorates the Battle of Mine Creek in the American Civil War. On October 25, 1864, approximately 2,800 Union troops attacked and defeated about 8,000 Confederates along the banks of Mine Creek. It was one of the largest cavalry battles in the Civil War, and the only major battle fought in Kansas. The Union brigades were commanded by Colonels Frederick W. Benteen and John Finis Philips. After this battle, Federal forces pursued and defeated additional Confederates in Missouri as they attempted to return to Arkansas, the Indian Territory (Oklahoma), and Texas.

In 1970, the Kansas legislature approved the acquisition of a 160-acre (65 ha) parcel of the battlefield area. The battlefield was listed in the National Register of Historic Places in 1973, and an additional 120 acres (49 ha) were purchased in 1974. A visitor center opened on October 24, 1998, the 134th anniversary of the eve of battle. As of mid-2023, the American Battlefield Trust and its partners have preserved 326 acres of the battlefield.

== History ==
On September 19, 1864, General Sterling Price led a Confederate army of about 12,000 men across the southern border of Missouri, which he hoped to capture for the South. His orders were to "rally the loyal men of Missouri" and fill his ranks with fresh recruits. If "compelled to withdraw from the state," Price was to make his "retreat through Kansas...sweeping that country of its mules, horses, cattle, and military supplies of all kinds".

Price's three divisions moved toward St. Louis. On September 27, they defeated a much smaller Federal force at Pilot Knob. Confederate losses were heavy, however, and St. Louis had been reinforced; Price chose to turn west, making no attempt to capture the city. He proceeded along the southern bank of the Missouri River, destroying sections of the railroad and capturing several small towns as he moved toward the Kansas border.

As word of Price's movements spread, Kansans prepared for an invasion. Governor Thomas Carney called out the state militia on October 8. General Samuel R. Curtis combined the forces at his disposal to form the Army of the Border. The fighting began for Kansas troops with a skirmish at Lexington, Missouri on October 19. The Confederates won several battles in the Kansas City area, including the Battle of the Big Blue on October 22 (a painting exists of Union troops taken prisoner after this battle). The invading force was repulsed at Westport on October 23, however, and forced to retreat down the state line. The following day, Curtis released most of the Kansas militia and reformed his army. General James G. Blunt commanded the First Division and General Alfred Pleasonton the Second. The total strength of the pursuing Union army was about 10,000 men (all cavalry).

Crossing into Kansas in Linn County on October 24, Price's army camped near Trading Post. Before dawn on October 25, it was overtaken by the pursuing Federal force. A running battle commenced, lasting the entire day; however, the decisive engagement came late in the morning. General John S. Marmaduke, one of the Confederate division commanders, was forced to fight a rear-guard action on the north bank of Mine Creek to protect Price's fleeing wagon train. He was supported by General James Fleming Fagan's division, which had already crossed the creek. The two Confederate divisions contained about 7,000 men. Although the Union advance under Pleasonton numbered less than 2,500, the rebels were crushed by a furious cavalry charge.

Colonel Charles W. Blair, 14th Kansas Cavalry, explained: "For a time [during the initial clash] the fire was incessant and terrific. Both lines seemed like walls of adamant--one could not advance; the other would not recede". Colonel F. W. Benteen was commander of the brigade which first made contact with the enemy. He described a "fierce hand-to-hand fight, one that surpassed anything for the time it lasted [that] I have ever witnessed." In less than an hour the battle was over; Confederate soldiers were bolting to the rear "in utter and indescribable confusion," according to General Price. His army narrowly missed total destruction.

Continuing his retreat, Price was forced to abandon plans to attack Fort Scott. His troops purposely destroyed most of the wagon train carrying their supplies and booty. After a short rest, Generals Curtis and Blunt followed in pursuit. On October 28 they handed Price his final defeat at Newtonia, Missouri. The rebel army recrossed the Arkansas River on November 8. For all practical purposes, the Civil War in the West was over.
