= Mine Creek Bridge =

- U.S. National Register of Historic Places
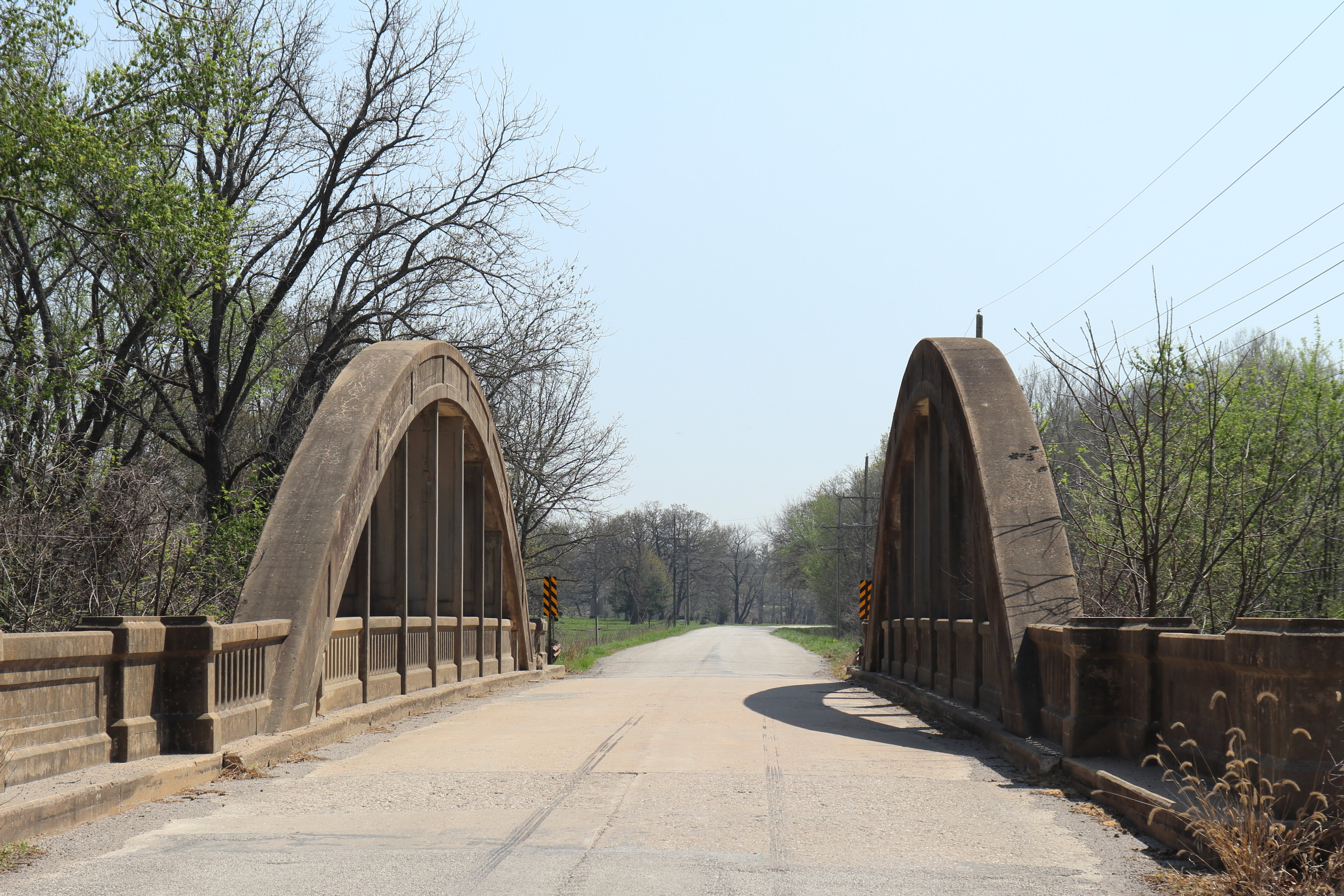

- Location within Kansas Location within the United States
- Location: East of Mound City, Kansas
- Coordinates: 38.141389°N 94.695°W
- Area: 0.5 acres (0.20 ha)
- Built: 1927
- Built by: Maxwell Construction Company
- Architect: James Barney Marsh
- MPS: Rainbow Arch Marsh Arch Bridges of Kansas TR
- NRHP reference No.: 83000430
- Added to NRHP: March 10, 1983

The Mine Creek Bridge, located east of Mound City in Linn County, Kansas, was built in 1927. It was listed on the National Register of Historic Places in 1983.

It is a 110 feet (34 m) long reinforced concrete Marsh arch bridge bringing a 20 feet (6.1 m) roadway across Mine Creek. It is a type of through arch bridge.

It was built by Maxwell Construction Company at a cost of $15,037.60.

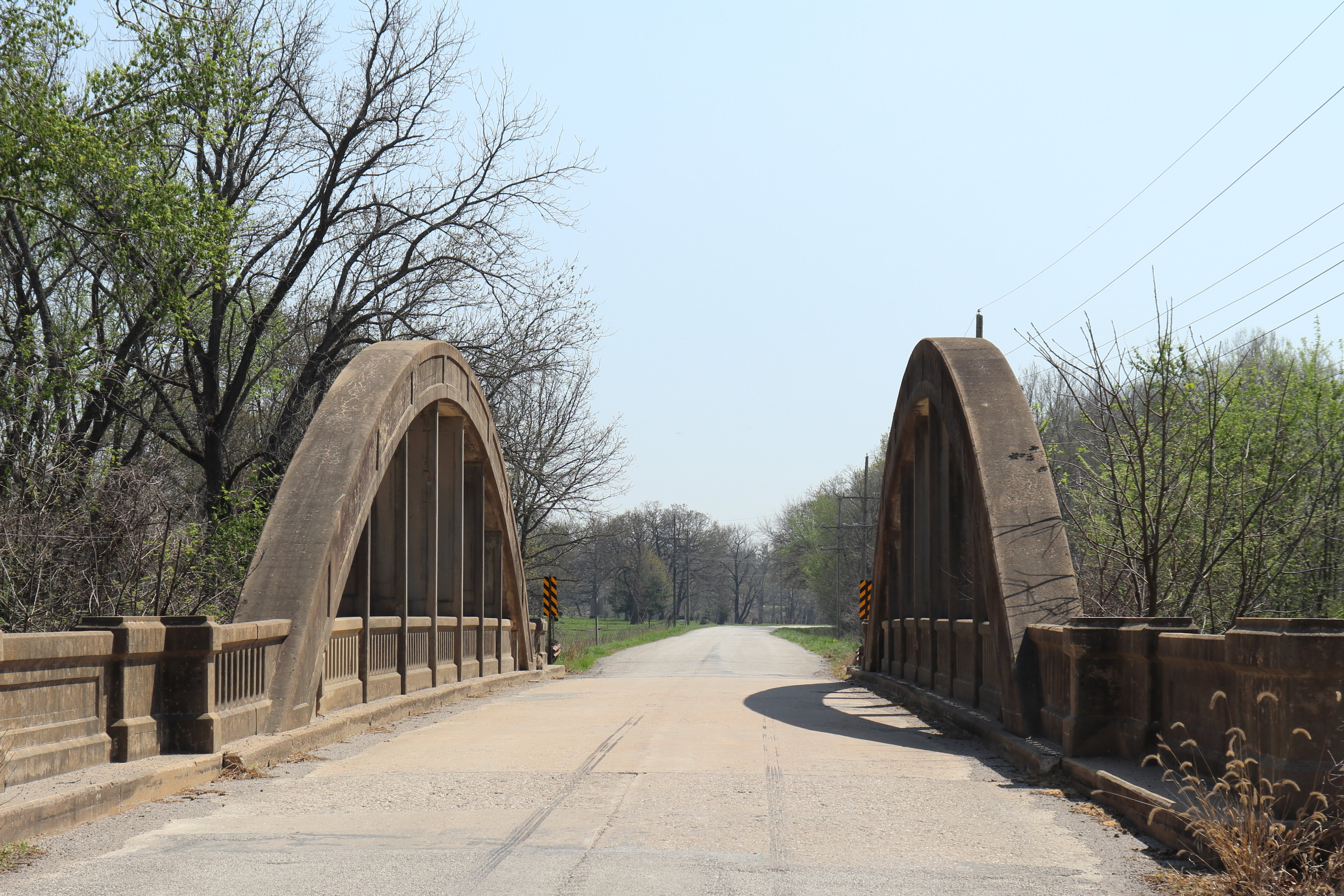
Mine Creek Bridge

== See also ==
- Battle of Mine Creek Site, also NRHP-listed in Linn County
