= Prescott House =

Prescott House may refer to:

- Benjamin Franklin Prescott House, Epping, New Hampshire, on the National Register of Historic Places (NRHP)
- C. J. Prescott House, Virginia City, Nevada, on the NRHP
- Gustavus G. Prescott House, Somerville, Massachusetts, on the NRHP
- J.L. Prescott House, North Berwick, Maine, on the NRHP
- William H. Prescott House, Boston, Massachusetts, on the NRHP

== See also ==
- Prescott Town House, Petersham, Massachusetts, on the NRHP
- Eaton–Prescott House, Reading, Massachusetts, on the NRHP
- Prescott House Museum, Starr's Point, Nova Scotia, Canada, a historic house and gardens
