= Marais des Cygnes massacre =

- Marais des Cygnes Massacre Site
- U.S. National Register of Historic Places
- U.S. National Historic Landmark
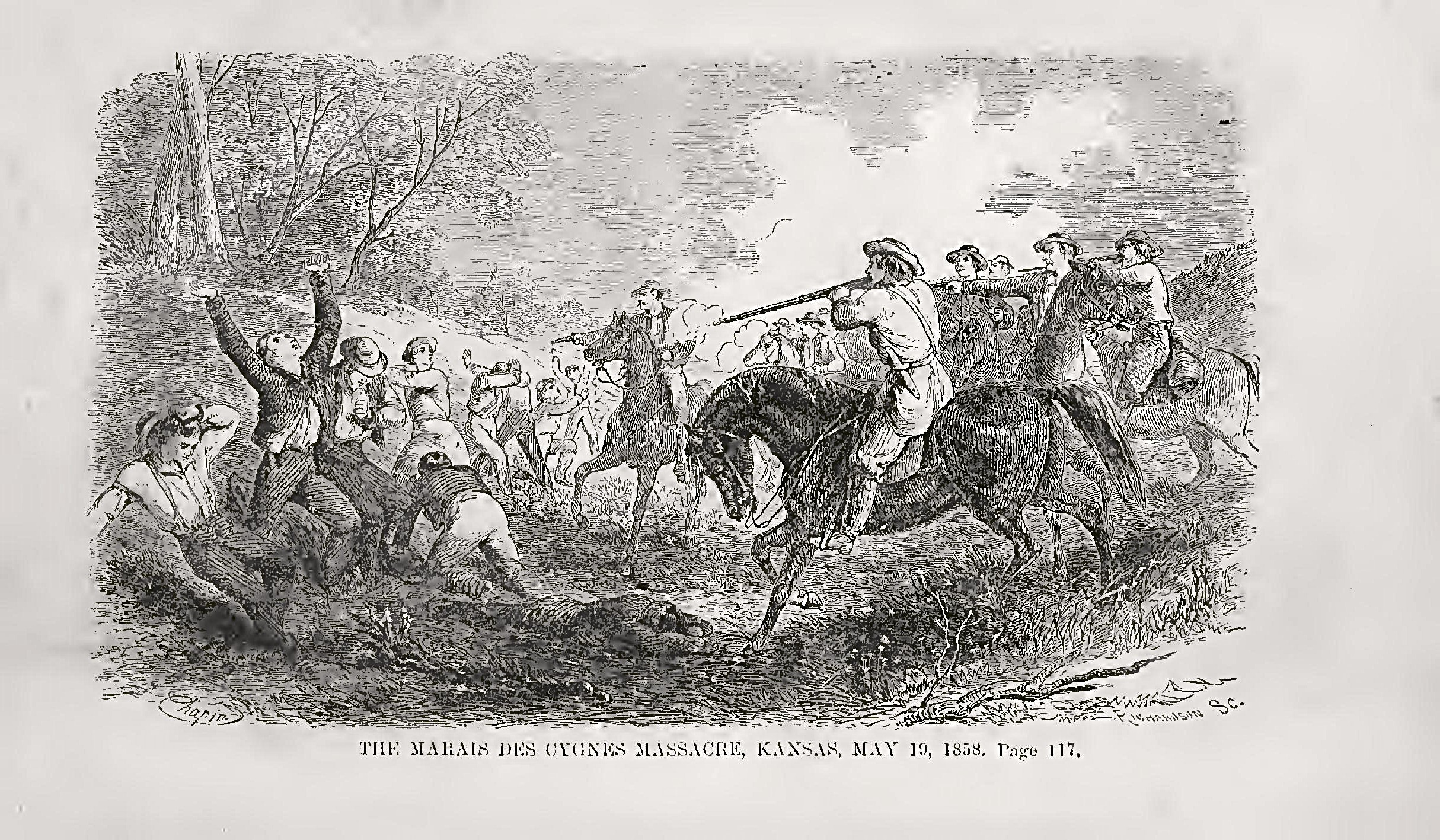
- An illustrated depiction of the massacre by the engraver James H. Richardson of an artwork by John R. Chapin from page 117 of Albert D. Richardson's Beyond the Mississippi (1867)

- Location within Kansas Location within the United States
- Nearest city: Trading Post, Kansas
- Coordinates: 38°16′52″N 94°37′12″W
- Area: 43 acres (17 ha)
- NRHP reference No.: 71000317

Significant dates
- Added to NRHP: June 21, 1971
- Designated NHL: May 30, 1974

The Marais des Cygnes massacre (/ˌmɛər də ˈziːn, - ˈsiːn, ˈmɛər də ziːn/, also /məˌriː də ˈsiːn, məˌreɪ də ˈseɪn/) is considered the last significant act of violence in Bleeding Kansas prior to the outbreak of the American Civil War. On May 19, 1858, approximately 30 border ruffians led by Charles Hamilton, a Georgia native and proslavery leader, crossed into the Kansas Territory from Missouri. They arrived at Trading Post, Kansas, in the morning and then headed back to Missouri. Along the way, they captured 11 abolitionist Free-Staters, none of whom were armed and, it is said, none of whom had participated in the ongoing violence. Most of the men knew Hamilton and did not realize he meant them harm. These prisoners were led into a defile, where Hamilton ordered his men to shoot, firing the first and last bullet himself. Five men were killed and five severely wounded. Only one Free-Stater escaped injury.

The abolitionist John Brown later built a fort near the site. The site of the massacre is preserved by the Kansas Historical Society as the Marais des Cygnes Massacre State Historic Site, originally called the Marais des Cygnes Massacre Memorial Park. The first commemoration at the site was two stone markers erected by men of the 3rd Iowa Cavalry Regiment in 1864, although these monuments had been destroyed by souvenir hunters by 1895. In 1941, the land where the massacre occurred, as well as an 1870s-era house constructed by a friend of Brown, were transferred to the state of Kansas. The site was listed on the National Register of Historic Places in 1971 and designated a National Historic Landmark in 1974.

== History ==
=== Background ===
When the United States Congress passed the Kansas–Nebraska Act in 1854, it did not directly state whether Kansas Territory and Nebraska Territory would allow slavery or not, but that the issue would be decided by popular sovereignty. While Nebraska did not see much controversy, Kansas became a hotly debated area. While the previous Missouri Compromise would have prevented slavery from being practiced in Kansas, the new law left the question open. In response to the new opening, pro-slavery advocates known as border ruffians, many of whom were from Missouri, entered Kansas to illegally vote in an attempt to sway local elections. The New England Emigrant Aid Company also sought to bring anti-slavery settlers into the territory. The elections, which were held on March 30, 1855, resulted in a pro-slavery majority in the Kansas territorial government, who in turn created laws protecting slavery and among other things, outlawing abolitionist literature. Abolitionist sentiment was strong near Lawrence, and several prominent Lawrence residents formed the Free State Party to organize resistance to the pro-slavery government in September. In October, the free-staters drafted the Topeka Constitution, which sought to create an abolitionist government in the state. There were now both pro- and anti-slavery governments vying for control of Kansas; President of the United States Franklin Pierce supported the pro-slavery government as the lawful one.

Beginning in 1855, the political disturbances transitioned into a period of sporadic violence known as Bleeding Kansas. On May 21, 1856, the Sack of Lawrence was carried out by several hundred supporters of slavery. While there were no fatalities, several buildings were burned down and newspaper equipment was destroyed. Later that month, John Brown, an abolitionist, led a group that murdered five pro-slavery southerners in a single night, an event that became known as the Pottawatomie massacre. In 1858, the situation deteriorated further. James Montgomery led a group of free-staters who fought with elements of the United States Army garrison of Fort Scott in the Battle of Paint Creek in April; one of the soldiers was slain in the action. The next month, Montgomery and some of his followers successfully evicted border ruffians from Linn County.

=== Massacre ===
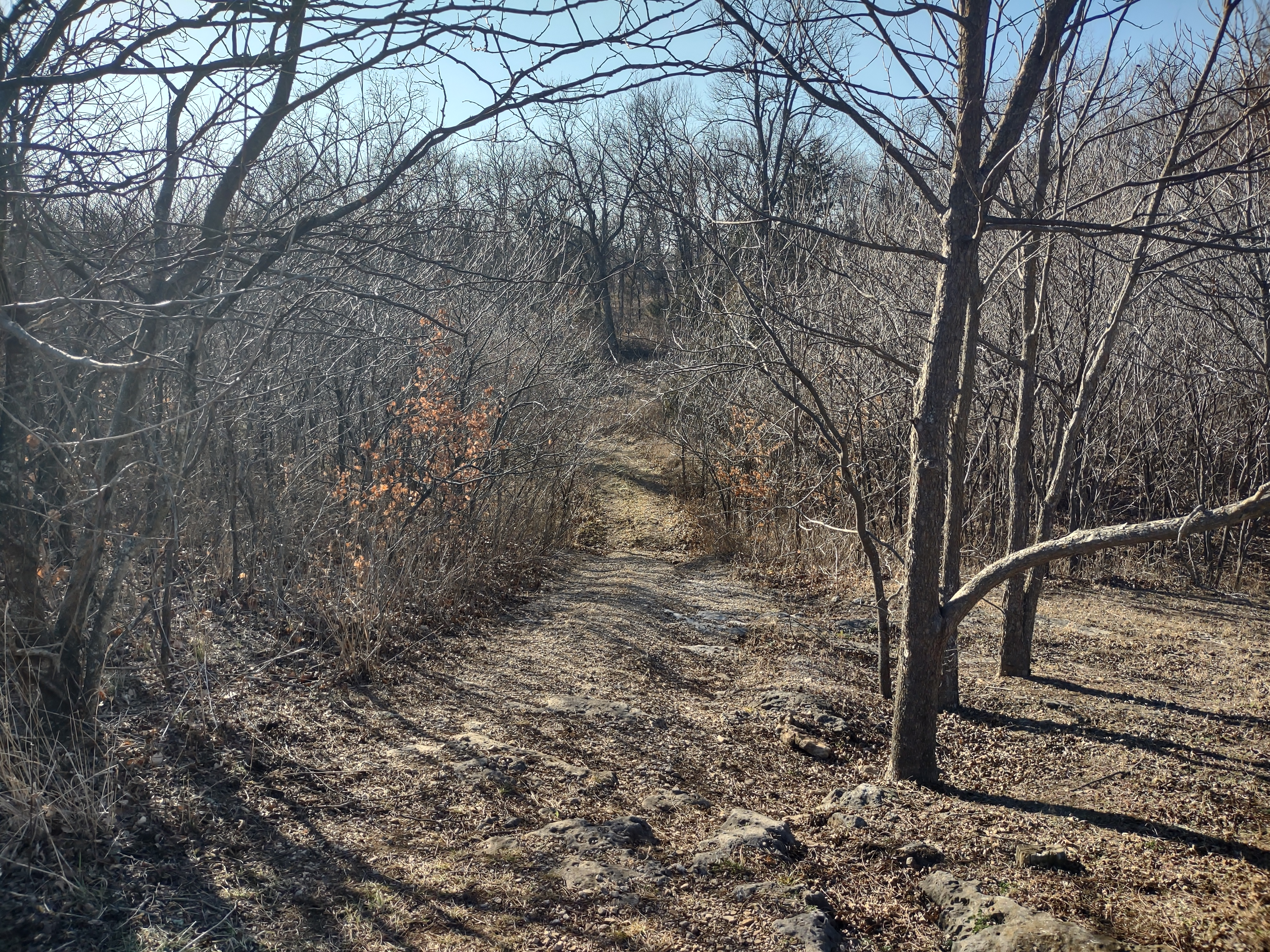
The site in 2021

On May 19, a border ruffian named Charles Hamilton led a group of about 30 men on a ride through the settlement of Trading Post. Hamilton was a slaveowner who had been driven from Linn County to Missouri by James Montgomery and sought revenge. After taking 11 local free-staters hostage from their homes and fields, the border ruffians forced them into a nearby ravine and began shooting at them. 10 of the men were hit by the fire, five of them fatally. The wife of one of the victims followed the border ruffians to the site, and attempted to give medical treatment to the wounded. Later that day, other locals gathered at the area, aiding the wounded and disposing of the bodies of the dead. Rumor spread that the massacre had been planned in a building known as the Western Hotel; Montgomery unsuccessfully attempted to burn it down on June 5.

Hamilton and his gang returned to Missouri. Only one man was ever prosecuted for his involvement in the massacre: William Griffith of Bates County, Missouri. In the spring of 1863, Griffith was recognized by a survivor of the massacre and arrested. That October, he was convicted of first degree murder for his role in the massacre and sentenced to death. Griffith was executed by hanging on October 30, 1863.

Land south of the ravine where the massacre occurred was owned by a local blacksmith, who later sold the site to Charles Hadsall, a friend of Brown. In late June, Brown built a two-story log fort south of the ravine; Hadsall allowed him to keep a military post at the site. Brown abandoned the fort later that summer.

== Commemoration ==
The incident horrified the U.S. and inspired John Greenleaf Whittier to write a poem on the murders, "Le Marais du Cygne", which appeared in the September 1858 The Atlantic Monthly.

Commemoration of the massacre began in late October 1864, when men of the 3rd Iowa Cavalry Regiment erected two stone markers at the site, after the Battle of Mine Creek during the American Civil War. In 1889, on the anniversary of the battle, a formal monument to the victims was dedicated in a cemetery at Trading Post. By 1895, souvenir hunters had largely destroyed the 1864 markers. Hadsall, probably in the 1870s, built a stone house next to the fort site. A spring was enclosed by the house, although the fort itself was destroyed by sightseers. In 1941, a Veterans of Foreign Wars post donated the site of the massacre and Hadsall's house to the state of Kansas, which designated it as the Marais des Cygnes Massacre Memorial Park.

From 1961–1962, the home underwent a renovation, after which it was transferred to Kansas Historical Society administration. In 1964, part of the house was transitioned into use as a museum. The site was listed on the National Register of Historic Places on June 21, 1971, with a reference number of 71000317. It was further listed as a National Historic Landmark (NHL) on May 30, 1974. The area is still rural. Signs provide interpretation of the events of the massacre, and a hand-cranked device plays an audio recording. The NHL-designated area incorporates 43 acres (17 ha). As of October 2020, the site is open from dusk to dawn. No admission fee is charged, and visits are self-guided. The Hadsall house still stands and can be viewed from the exterior. Sites designed for picnicing are also present at the park.

== See also ==
- Freedom's Frontier National Heritage Area
- Great Hanging at Gainesville
- List of battles fought in Kansas
- List of incidents of civil unrest in the United States
- List of National Historic Landmarks in Kansas
- National Register of Historic Places in Linn County, Kansas

== Sources ==
- Napier, Rita G. (2004). "The Hidden History of Bleeding Kansas". Kansas History. 27 (1/2). ISSN 0149-9114.
- Richard D. Pankratz (1970). "National Register of Historic Places Inventory/Nomination: Marais des Cygnes Massacre Site / Marais des Cygnes Massacre Memorial Park". National Park Service.
