= Old Linn County Jail =

- U.S. National Register of Historic Places
- Location within Kansas Location within the United States
- Location: 312 Main St., Mound City, Kansas
- Coordinates: 38°8′34″N 94°48′37″W
- Area: less than one acre
- Built: 1867-68
- Built by: Bunn, Ezekial
- NRHP reference No.: 78001285
- Added to NRHP: November 30, 1978

The Old Linn County Jail, also known as City Hall, at 312 Main Street in Mound City in Linn County, Kansas was built in 1867–68. It was listed on the National Register of Historic Places in 1978.

It is two-story front-gabled building with 21 inches (0.53 m) thick brick walls on a 27 by 34 feet (8.2 m × 10.4 m) plan.

The building began serving as city hall for Mound City in 1903.

== See also ==
- Linn County Courthouse, also NRHP-listed in Mound City
