= Prescott High School =

Prescott High School may refer to:

- Prescott High School (Arizona) in Prescott, Arizona
- Prescott High School (Arkansas) in Prescott, Arkansas
- Prescott High School (Wisconsin) in Prescott, Wisconsin
