= Battle of Mine Creek order of battle: Confederate =

The following Confederate Army units and commanders fought in the Battle of Mine Creek of the American Civil War. The Union order of battle is listed separately.

== Abbreviations used ==
=== Military rank ===
- MG = Major General
- BG = Brigadier General
- Col = Colonel
- Ltc = Lieutenant Colonel
- Maj = Major
- Cpt = Captain
- Lt = 1st Lieutenant

=== Other ===
- c = captured

== Army of Missouri ==
MG Sterling Price

Division	Brigade	Regiments and Others
Fagan's Division; MG James F. Fagan	Cabell's Brigade BG William L. Cabell (c October 25, 1864); Ltc A. V. Reiff	Gordon's Arkansas Cavalry: Col Anderson Gordon; Gunter's Arkansas Cavalry Battalion: Ltc Thomas M. Gunter; Harrell's Arkansas Cavalry Battalion: Ltc John M. Harrell; Monroe's Arkansas Cavalry: Col James C. Monroe; Morgan's Arkansas Cavalry: Col Thomas J. Morgan; Witherspoon's Arkansas Cavalry Battalion: Maj J. L. Witherspoon; Hughey's Arkansas Battery: Cpt W. M. Hughey
Fagan's Division; MG James F. Fagan	Slemmons' Brigade Col William F. Slemons (c); Col William A. Crawford	2nd Arkansas Cavalry Regiment: Ltc T. W. Jackman; Carlton's Arkansas Cavalry Regiment: Ltc R. H. Thompson; Crawford's Arkansas Cavalry Regiment: Col William A. Crawford; Wright's Arkansas Cavalry Regiment: Col John C. Wright
Fagan's Division; MG James F. Fagan	Dobbin's Brigade Col Archibald S. Dobbins	1st Arkansas Cavalry Regiment: Maj Samuel Corley; McGhee's Arkansas Cavalry Regiment: Ltc Jessup Grider; Witt's Arkansas Cavalry Regiment: Col A. R. Witt; Blocher's Arkansas Battery (one section): Lt J. V. Zimmerman
Fagan's Division; MG James F. Fagan	McCray's Brigade Col Thomas H. McCray	45th Arkansas Mounted Infantry Regiment: Col Milton D. Baber (c October 22, 1864); 47th Arkansas Mounted Infantry Regiment: Col Lee Crandall (c); 45th Missouri Cavalry: Col Timothy J. Reeves
Fagan's Division; MG James F. Fagan	Unattached	Anderson's Arkansas Cavalry Battalion: Cpt William L. Anderson; Lyle's Arkansas Cavalry: Col Oliver P. Lyle; Rogan's Arkansas Cavalry: Col James W. Rogan

Division	Brigade	Regiments and Others
Marmaduke's Division; MG John S. Marmaduke (c); BG John Bullock Clark, Jr. Escort: Advance Scouting Company: Cpt Page; Company D, 5th Missouri Cavalry: Cpt D. R. Stallard; Sgt Armstrong	Clark's Brigade BG John B. Clark Jr. Col Colton Greene	3rd Missouri Cavalry: Col Colton Greene; 4th Missouri Cavalry: John Q. Burbridge; 7th Missouri Cavalry/Davies' Missouri Cavalry Battalion: Ltc J. F. Davies; 8th Missouri Cavalry: Col William L. Jeffers (c); 10th Missouri Cavalry: Col Robert R. Lawther; 14th Missouri Cavalry Battalion: Ltc Robert C. Wood; Harris' Missouri Battery: Lt T. J. Williams; Hynson's Texas Battery: Cpt H. C. Hynson; Hogan's Engineer Company: Cpt James T. Hogan
Marmaduke's Division; MG John S. Marmaduke (c); BG John Bullock Clark, Jr. Escort: Advance Scouting Company: Cpt Page; Company D, 5th Missouri Cavalry: Cpt D. R. Stallard; Sgt Armstrong	Freemans's Brigade Col Thomas R. Freeman	Ford's Arkansas Cavalry Battalion: Ltc Barney Ford; Freeman's Missouri Cavalry: Maj M. V. Shaver; Fristoe's Missouri Cavalry: Col Edward T. Fristoe

Division	Brigade	Regiments and Others
Shelby's Division; BG Joseph O. Shelby; Escort: Advance Scouting: Cpt A. C. McCoy	Thompson's Brigade BG M. Jeff Thompson	5th Missouri Cavalry: Col B. Frank Gordon; 11th Missouri Cavalry: Col Moses W. Smith; 12th Missouri Cavalry: Ltc W. H. Erwin; Elliott's Missouri Cavalry: Col Benjamin Elliott; Johnson's Cavalry Battalion: Maj Rector Johnson; Collins' Missouri Battery (one section): Cpt Richard A. Collins
Shelby's Division; BG Joseph O. Shelby; Escort: Advance Scouting: Cpt A. C. McCoy	Jackman's Brigade Col Sidney D. Jackman	Hunter's Missouri Cavalry: Col DeWitt C. Hunter; Jackman's Missouri Cavalry: Ltc C. H. Nichols; Schnable's Missouri Cavalry Battalion: Ltc John A. Schnable; Williams' Missouri Cavalry Battalion: Ltc D. A. Williams; Collins' Missouri Battery (one section): Lt Jacob D. Connor
Shelby's Division; BG Joseph O. Shelby; Escort: Advance Scouting: Cpt A. C. McCoy	Tylers's Brigade Col Charles H. Tyler	Coffee's Missouri Cavalry: Col John T. Coffee; Perkins' Missouri Cavalry: Col Caleb Perkins; Searcy's Missouri Cavalry: Col James J. Searcy
Shelby's Division; BG Joseph O. Shelby; Escort: Advance Scouting: Cpt A. C. McCoy	Unattached	46th Arkansas Mounted Infantry Regiment/Crabtree's Infantry (detachment): Col W. O. Coleman; Williams Regiment of Armed Recruits: Cpt Williams
