= Prescott (given name) =

Prescott is a masculine given name. Bearers of the name include:

- Prescott E. Bloom (1942–1986), American lawyer and politician
- Prescott Burgess (born 1984), American former National Football League player
- Prescott Bush (1895–1972), American banker and politician, father of President George H. W. Bush and grandfather of President George W. Bush and ex-governor Jeb Bush
- Prescott F. Cogswell (1859–1960), American politician
- Prescott Durand Crout (1907–1984), American mathematician
- Prescott Currier (1912–1995), American naval officer and cryptanalyst
- Prescott F. Hall (1868–1921), American lawyer, author and eugenicist
- Prescott Gardner Hewett (1812–1891), British surgeon and serjeant-surgeon extraordinary to Queen Victoria
- Prescott B. Huntington (1905–1988), American politician
- Prescott Lecky (1892–1941), American psychologist
- Prescott Metcalf, American businessman and 8th mayor of Erie, Pennsylvania
- Prescott Niles, American rock bassist
- Prescott Townsend (1894–1973), American gay rights activist
- Prescott Wright (1935–2006), American animated film producer and distributor
