= Prescott Rural High School =

- U.S. National Register of Historic Places
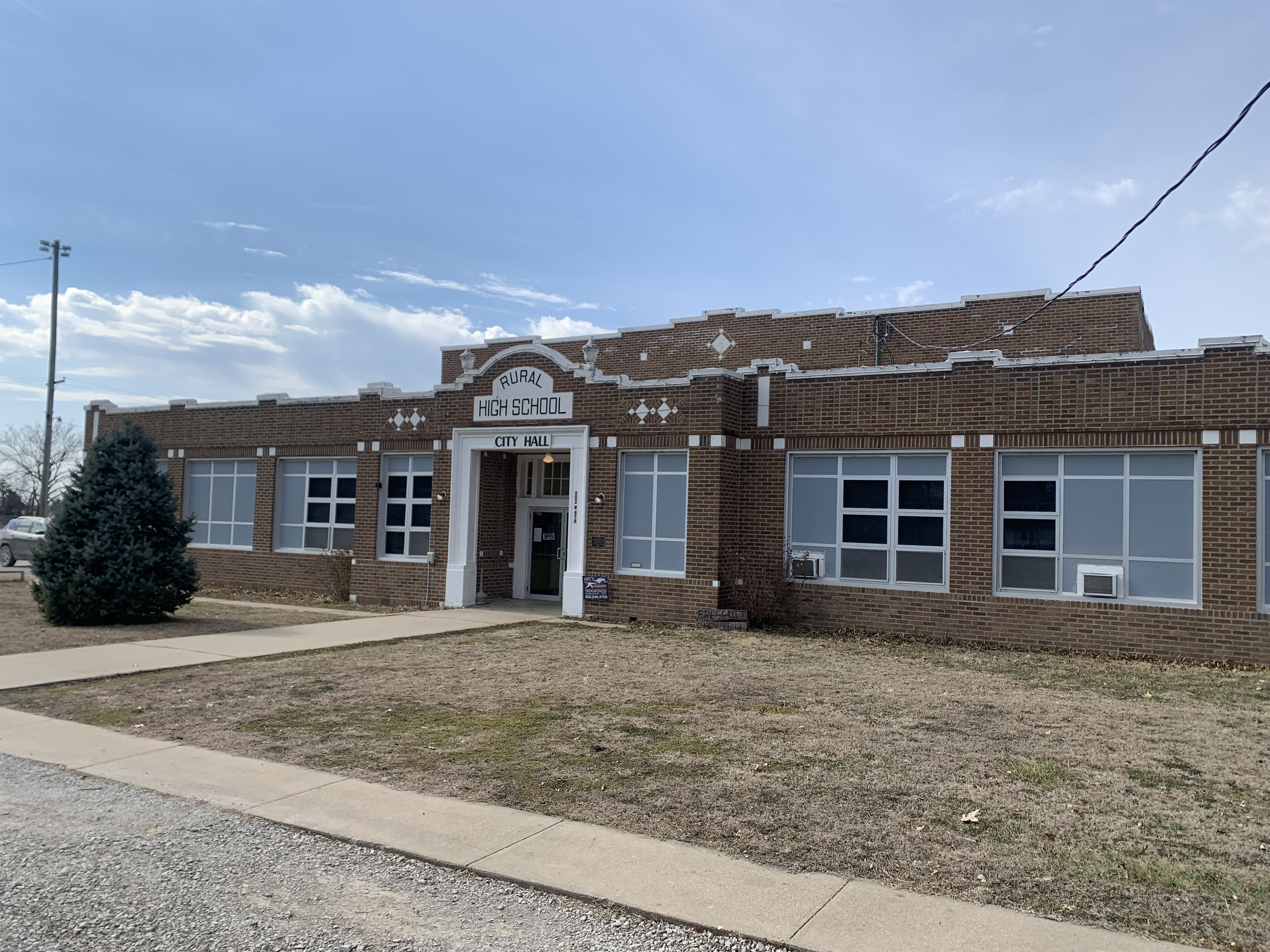
- Prescott Rural High School (Prescott City Hall) in 2026

- Location within Kansas Location within the United States
- Location: 202 West 4th St, Prescott, Kansas
- Coordinates: 38.065°N 94.699722°W
- Area: 4 acres (1.6 ha)
- Built: 1924, c.1950, c.1961
- Architect: Ray Gamble
- Architectural style: Early Commercial
- MPS: Public Schools of Kansas MPS
- NRHP reference No.: 08000610
- Added to NRHP: July 3, 2008

The Prescott Rural High School, on West 4th Street in Prescott, Kansas, was built in 1924. It has also been known as Prescott Elementary School. It was listed on the National Register of Historic Places in 2008 as part of a Multiple Property Submission for public schools in Kansas.

The main portion of the school building is 108 by 96 feet (33 m × 29 m) in plan. It was designed by architect Ray L. Gamble and is of Early Commercial architecture, with Mission/Spanish Revival architecture details. It was expanded by rear additions in about 1950 and 1961.
