= Linn County Courthouse (Kansas) =

- U.S. National Register of Historic Places
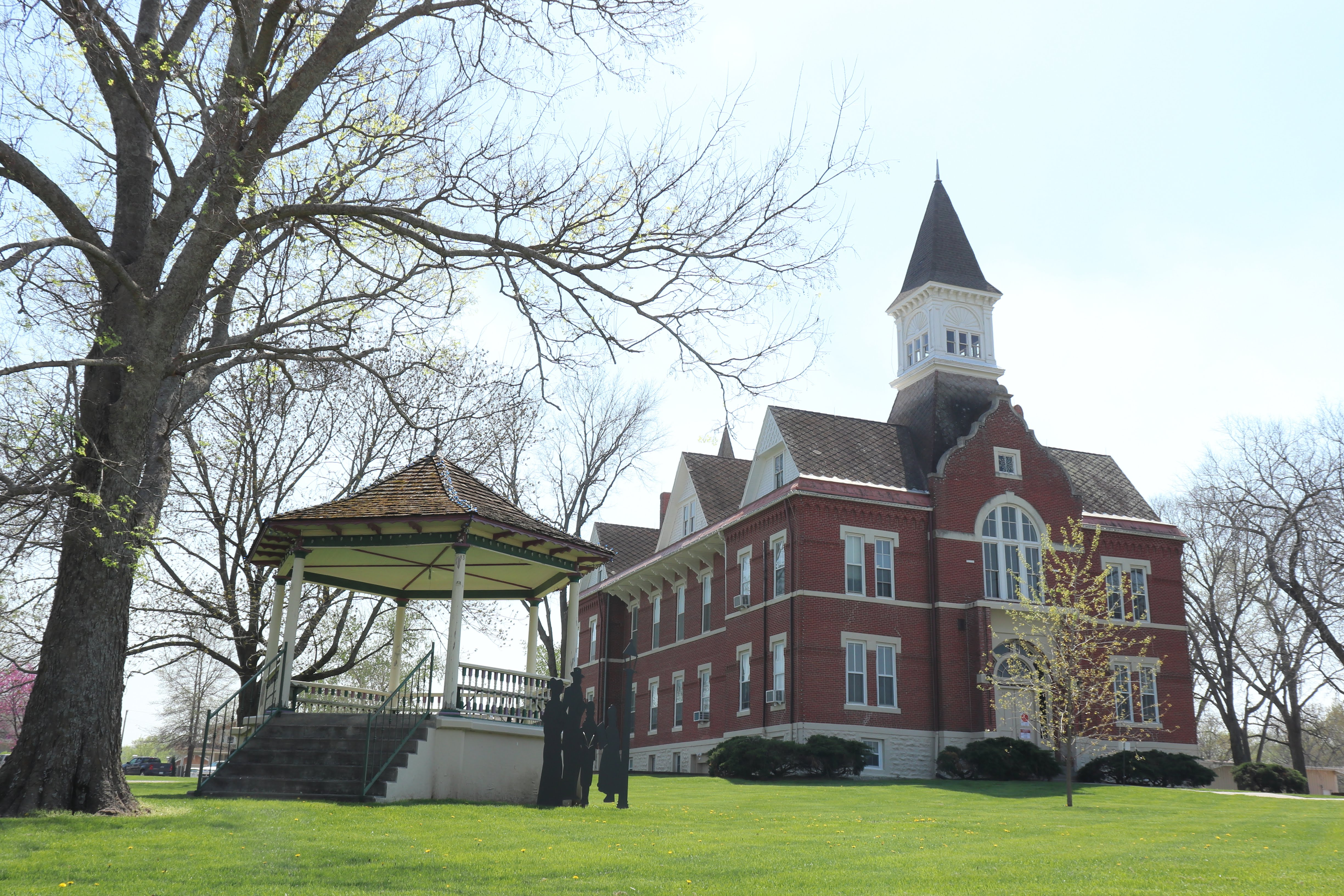
- The Linn County Courthouse in 2020

- Location within Kansas Location within the United States
- Location: 315 Main St., Mound City, Kansas
- Coordinates: 38°8′31″N 94°48′37″W
- Area: 2 acres (0.81 ha)
- Built: 1885
- Architect: George Ropes
- Architectural style: Renaissance
- NRHP reference No.: 74000842
- Added to NRHP: July 15, 1974

The Linn County Courthouse in Mound City, Kansas, was built in 1885. It was listed on the National Register of Historic Places in 1974.

It was designed by Topeka architect George Ropes. It is a two-story-with-basement red brick building with a 110 by 60 feet (34 m × 18 m) plan and height almost 65 feet (20 m). Its foundation is a native limestone wall, separated from brick above by a smooth cut stone belt course. A second belt course circles the building at level of the second story's window sills.

== See also ==
- Old Linn County Jail, also NRHP-listed in Mound City
