= Ford's Arkansas Cavalry Battalion =

- Active: 1861–1864
- Disbanded: October 25, 1864
- Country: Confederate States of America
- Branch: Confederate States Army
- Type: Cavalry
- Size: Battalion
- Engagements: American Civil War: Battle of Mine Creek

The Ford's Arkansas Cavalry Battalion (1861 – October 25, 1864) was a Confederate Army cavalry battalion during the American Civil War.

== Organization ==
Ford's Battalion Arkansas Cavalry was organized on August 27, 1864 as part of the forces organized for Price's Missouri Raid the unit is also credited to Missouri.

The Field and Staff Officers were Lieutenant-Colonel Barney Ford and Major Enoch O. Wolf. Barney Ford (1833-1911) was residing in Independence County, Arkansas, when the war started. He served as a second lieutenant in Co. B, 1st Arkansas Regiment 30-Day Volunteers, from November 19 to December 18, 1861. He next enlisted as a second lieutenant in Co. G, 27th (Shaler's) Arkansas Infantry, at Mount Olive, Arkansas, on May 12, 1862, and was successively promoted to first lieutenant and captain. He was dropped from the roll pursuant to General Orders No. 39, Headquarters Tappan's Brigade, dated November 18, 1863, for allegedly "having deserted his command while at Camp Mitchell." There are questions about the veracity of the charge against him. Col. James R. Shaler, a Missourian commanding the 27th Arkansas, was universally despised by his men. Shaler had a number of run-ins with his company officers, and it is supposed that Ford was a victim of Shaler's retribution. Enoch O. Wolf commanded a company in the sort lived McCarver's 14th Arkansas Regiment in 1861.

Company A, Commanded by Capt. Alfred Phillips. Some historians believe that the company was from Independence County. The Jacksonport parole list indicate Smithville in Lawrence County as the place of enlistment.

Company B, Commanded by Capt. J. M. McCord. The Jacksonport Muster Rolls indicated Fulton County as the place of enlistment for most of the men. McCord is listed as Lawrence county.

Company C, Commanded by Capt. J. V. Richardson There is no parole list from Jacksonport for this company. Some historians suggest that the company was raised in Jackson County. Many of these men had previously served in the 32nd Arkansas Infantry.

Company D, Commanded by Capt. J. C. Armstrong. Some historians indicate that the company was organized in Lawrence county. The Jacksonport parole lists indicate Fulton County as the place of enlistment for most of the Soldiers.

Company E, There are no parole list from Jacksonport for this company and the commander is unknown. Some historians indicate that the company was from Lawrence county.

Company F, There are no parole list from Jacksonport for this company and the Commander is unknown. Some historians indicate that the company was from Izard county.

== Service ==
The battalion engaged in small unit skirmishes and ambushes along the Missouri and Arkansas border. They were so successful that Union leaders labeled them as guerrillas; however, Ford and his men were regularly mustered Confederate soldiers. The battalion's only significant combat was during Price's Missouri Raid campaign in the Fall of 1864. The unit participated in the following engagements:

Price's Missouri Raid, Arkansas-Missouri-Kansas, September–October 1864
Battle of Fort Davidson (September 27, 1864)
Fourth Battle of Boonville (October 11)
Battle of Glasgow, Missouri (October 15)
Battle of Sedalia (October 15)
Second Battle of Lexington (October 19)
Battle of Little Blue River (October 21)
Second Battle of Independence (October 21–22)
Battle of Byram's Ford (October 22–23)
Battle of Westport (October 23)
Battle of Marais des Cygnes, Linn County, Kansas, (October 25)
Battle of Mine Creek (October 25)
Battle of Marmiton River (October 25)
Second Battle of Newtonia (October 28)

=== Wolf almost executed ===
Major Wolf was captured during the Battle of Mine Creek during Price's Raid and was almost executed by Union authorities in retaliation for the death of several prisoners of war at the hands of Col. Tim Reeves. Several senior Confederate Commanders were captured during the battle of Mine Creek, including General Cabell and General Marmaduke. The Federals captured also seven majors including Major Wolf Maj. E. O. Wolf.

Early in Price's raid, at the Battle of Ironton, Confederate forces had captured Major James Wilson of the Missouri State Militia and five of his men. As soon as Col. Tim Reeves, a Confederate colonel, learned that Major Wilson was a prisoner he took a file of men and went to the guard tent and demanded Major Wilson and the six privates. As soon as Major Wilson saw Colonel Reeves he exclaimed: "I am a dead man, Colonel Reeves will kill me." And in his day book he wrote a few lines to his wife, and give it, money, and a pocket knife to a Federal prisoner. Colonel Reeves took Major Wilson and the six privates out a short distance and executed them. This execution was reportedly in retaliation for actions that Major Wilson had taken against the families of some of Colonel Reeves's men earlier in the war.

After Price's men had left the area, the bodies were discovered and the executions were reported to Union Major General Rosecrans. Ironically the number of Union prisoners killed was miss reported as being Major Wilson and six privates, instead of Major Wilson and five. General Rosecrans ordered a Confederate major and six Confederate privates being held as prisoner of war be executed in retaliation for the killing of Major Wilson and the six privates. As the Union currently had no Confederate majors as prisoners, they took out six privates and executed them on six hours' notice. When Major Wolf was captured at the battle of Mine Creek, the Union had its opportunity to seek revenge for the slaying of Major Wilson. The guards told Major Wolf that they drew straws to see which one should pay the debt, and Major Wolf was the unlucky one. On November 7, Department of the Missouri, Special Orders No. 287, ordered that Wolf be shot on November 11, in retaliation for the murder of Major Wilson.

The next morning after Major Wolf got to St. Louis, the guards attached a thirty two pound ball with chain to his leg. Then they took him to a large room set apart and read this sentence to him: "By orders of Major General Rosecrans. Major Wolf, you are to be shot to death with musketry in retaliation for the murder of Major Wilson and the six privates that Colonel Reeves executed." It was very early in the morning, and several Federal officers were present. On first reading Major Wolf did not fully understand, and called for a second reading, and when the adjutant had finished the second reading. Major Wolf explained that he knew nothing about the killing of Major Wilson, but as they were looking for an ardent Southern man to execute in retaliation, he supposed that they had made a fair selection. After the reading of the sentence they escorted Major Wolf to a cell, where he was closely guarded to await execution. They gave him four days. Captain Allen commanded the prison and treated Major Wolf kindly.

Fellow Confederate prisoners, General Cabell and Major Cariton wrote several letters to Union authorities at St. Louis on behalf of Major Wolf while he was under sentence of death. Captain Allen furnished Major Wolf with pen, ink, and paper, and he wrote a letter to his wife telling her the sad news and that it had fallen to his lot to be executed for the wrongs of other men. He told her how to rear his dear children and to take care of what he had left her. He hoped she would have no trouble rearing his children with the assistance of his Masonic friends. When Major Wolf had finished his letter, Captain Allen asked him if he wanted a preacher, and Major Wolf said yes. Captain Allen sent for Rev. A. C. Osborn, a Baptist minister. Rev Osborn told Major Wolf that if he had any relics he wanted his wife to have, he would take charge of them and see that she got them. The minister told Major Wolf if there was anything in the letter that was contraband he wouldn't be allowed to take it. The minister read Major Wolf's letter and noticed that Wolf told his wife to take care of what he had left her and with the assistance of his Masonic friends. The preacher asked: "Major, are you a Mason?" The Major replied: 'I am,". Rev. Osborn hurried out and called the lodge together and telegraphed President Abraham Lincoln to attempt to stop the execution.

Lincoln received telegrams from James E. Yeatman, Able Barton, and P. L. Terry, of St. Louis, Missouri, asking for clemency in the case of Major Wolf.

To William S. Rosecrans

Office U.S. Military Telegraph, Major General Rosecrans War Department, St. Louis, Mo. Washington, D.C., Nov. 10 1864.

Suspend execution of Major Wolf until further order, & meanwhile, report to me on the case. A. LINCOLN

On November 10, 1864, General Rosecrans acknowledged receipt of Lincoln's telegram, and on November 11 wrote a detailed report covering the essential facts of Major Wolf's case. President Lincoln ended the practice of retaliatory executions.

== Surrender ==
Lieutenant-Colonel Ford surrendered his battalion at Jacksonport, Arkansas, where they were paroled on June 5, 1865.

== See also ==
- List of Confederate units from Arkansas
- Confederate Units by State
