= Prescott Park =

Prescott Park may refer to:

- Prescott Park (New Hampshire), a park in Portsmouth, New Hampshire, United States
- Prescott Park (Oregon), a park in Medford, Oregon, United States, that includes Roxy Ann Peak
