= Battle of Mine Creek order of battle: Union =

Of the brigades listed below, only Philips' and Benteen's brigades, and a small part of Sanborn's brigade from the Union Army of the Border fought in the Battle of Mine Creek of the American Civil War. The Confederate order of battle is listed separately. The entire organization of the Army of the Border is shown.

== Command disputes ==
By order of MG James G. Blunt (General Field Orders No. 2) the militia regiments of William H. M. Fishbeck, Brigadier General of Militia, were placed under the command of Charles W. Blair, Colonel of Volunteers; Fishbeck was infuriated that his command had been subordinated to a volunteer officer. Because Kansas law stated that militia should be kept under the command of militia officers, Fishbeck disregarded Blunt's order. Blunt had Fishbeck arrested and held until released by order of MG Samuel Curtis. Upon his release, Fishbeck resumed command of the Kansas Militia regiments, with orders to obey directives that came from MG Blunt. This rather cumbersome arrangement had BG Fishbeck in direct command of the militia units attached to the 3rd Brigade, 1st Division, and Col Charles Blair in overall command of the brigade. Howard N. Monnett describes the arrangement as a "brigade within a brigade". Blair and Fishbeck led the militia into action at Westport (accompanied onto the field by MG George W. Dietzler), and then in the subsequent pursuit of Price until MG Curtis ordered the militia to return home.

== Abbreviations used ==
=== Military rank ===
- MG = Major General
- BG = Brigadier General
- Col = Colonel
- Ltc = Lieutenant Colonel
- Maj = Major
- Cpt = Captain
- Lt = 1st Lieutenant
- 2Lt = 2nd Lieutenant

== Army of the Border ==
MG Samuel Ryan Curtis

Escort:

- 2nd Kansas Cavalry (battalion): Maj Henry Hopkins
- Company G, 11th Kansas Cavalry: Cpt C. L. Gove
- Company H, 15th Kansas Cavalry
- Mountain howitzer battery: Lt Edward Gill

Division	Brigade	Regiments and Others
First Provisional Cavalry Division; MG James G. Blunt; Escort: Company E, 14th Kansas Cavalry: 2Lt William B. Clark	1st Brigade Col Charles R. Jennison	(Brigade did not participate in Battle of Mine Creek)
First Provisional Cavalry Division; MG James G. Blunt; Escort: Company E, 14th Kansas Cavalry: 2Lt William B. Clark	2nd Brigade Col Thomas Moonlight	(Brigade did not participate in Battle of Mine Creek)
First Provisional Cavalry Division; MG James G. Blunt; Escort: Company E, 14th Kansas Cavalry: 2Lt William B. Clark	3rd Brigade [Kansas State Militia Division] Col Charles W. Blair; BG William H. M. Fishback	(Brigade did not participate in Battle of Mine Creek)
First Provisional Cavalry Division; MG James G. Blunt; Escort: Company E, 14th Kansas Cavalry: 2Lt William B. Clark	4th Brigade Col James Hobart Ford	(Brigade did not participate in Battle of Mine Creek)

Division	Brigade	Regiments and Others
Second Division; MG Alfred Pleasonton; Escort: Company A, 11th Kansas Cavalry: Cpt Henry E. Palmer	1st Brigade Col John Finis Philips	1st Missouri State Militia Cavalry: Ltc Bazel F. Lazear; 4th Missouri State Militia Cavalry: Maj George W. Kelly; 7th Missouri State Militia Cavalry: Ltc Thomas Theodore Crittenden
Second Division; MG Alfred Pleasonton; Escort: Company A, 11th Kansas Cavalry: Cpt Henry E. Palmer	2nd Brigade BG John McNeil	17th Illinois Cavalry: Col John Lourie Beveridge; 7th Kansas Cavalry: Maj Francis M. Malone; 2nd Missouri Cavalry: Cpt George M. Houston; 13th Missouri Cavalry: Col Edwin C. Catherwood; 3rd Missouri State Militia Cavalry: Ltc Henry M. Matthews; 5th Missouri State Militia Cavalry: Ltc Joseph A. Eppstein; 9th Missouri State Militia Cavalry: Ltc Daniel M. Draper; Battery B, 2nd Missouri Light Artillery; Mountain howitzer battery (4 12-pdr); (Brigade arrived after conclusion of the Battle of Mine Creek, but was in the Battle of Little Osage and the Battle of Marmiton River immediately following the Battle of Mine Creek)
Second Division; MG Alfred Pleasonton; Escort: Company A, 11th Kansas Cavalry: Cpt Henry E. Palmer	3rd Brigade BG John Benjamin Sanborn	2nd Arkansas Cavalry: Col John Elisha Phelps; 6th Missouri State Militia Cavalry: Maj William Plumb; 8th Missouri State Militia Cavalry: Col Joseph J. Gravely; 6th Provisional Enrolled Missouri Militia: Col John F. McMahan; 7th Provisional Enrolled Missouri Militia: Maj W. B. Mitchell; Battery H, 2nd Missouri Light Artillery: Cpt William C. F. Montgomery; Battery L, 2nd Missouri Light Artillery: Cpt Charles H. Thurber; (Battery L, 2nd Missouri Light Artillery fought at the Battle of Mine Creek, remainder of Brigade arrived after conclusion of Battle of Mine Creek)
Second Division; MG Alfred Pleasonton; Escort: Company A, 11th Kansas Cavalry: Cpt Henry E. Palmer	4th Brigade Ltc Frederick William Benteen	7th Indiana Cavalry: Maj S. W. Simonson; 3rd Iowa Cavalry: Maj Benjamin S. Jones; 4th Iowa Cavalry: Maj Abial Richmond Pierce; 4th Missouri Cavalry (detachment): Cpt Charles D. Knispel [command combined with the 7th Indiana Cavalry]; 10th Missouri Cavalry: Maj William H. Lusk

== Notes ==
The list shown is the entire Army of the Border. Of this army, only Philip's and Benteen's Brigades were present at this battle. Other brigades from this army fought other battles during Price's Raid.
