= Prescott School =

- U.S. National Register of Historic Places
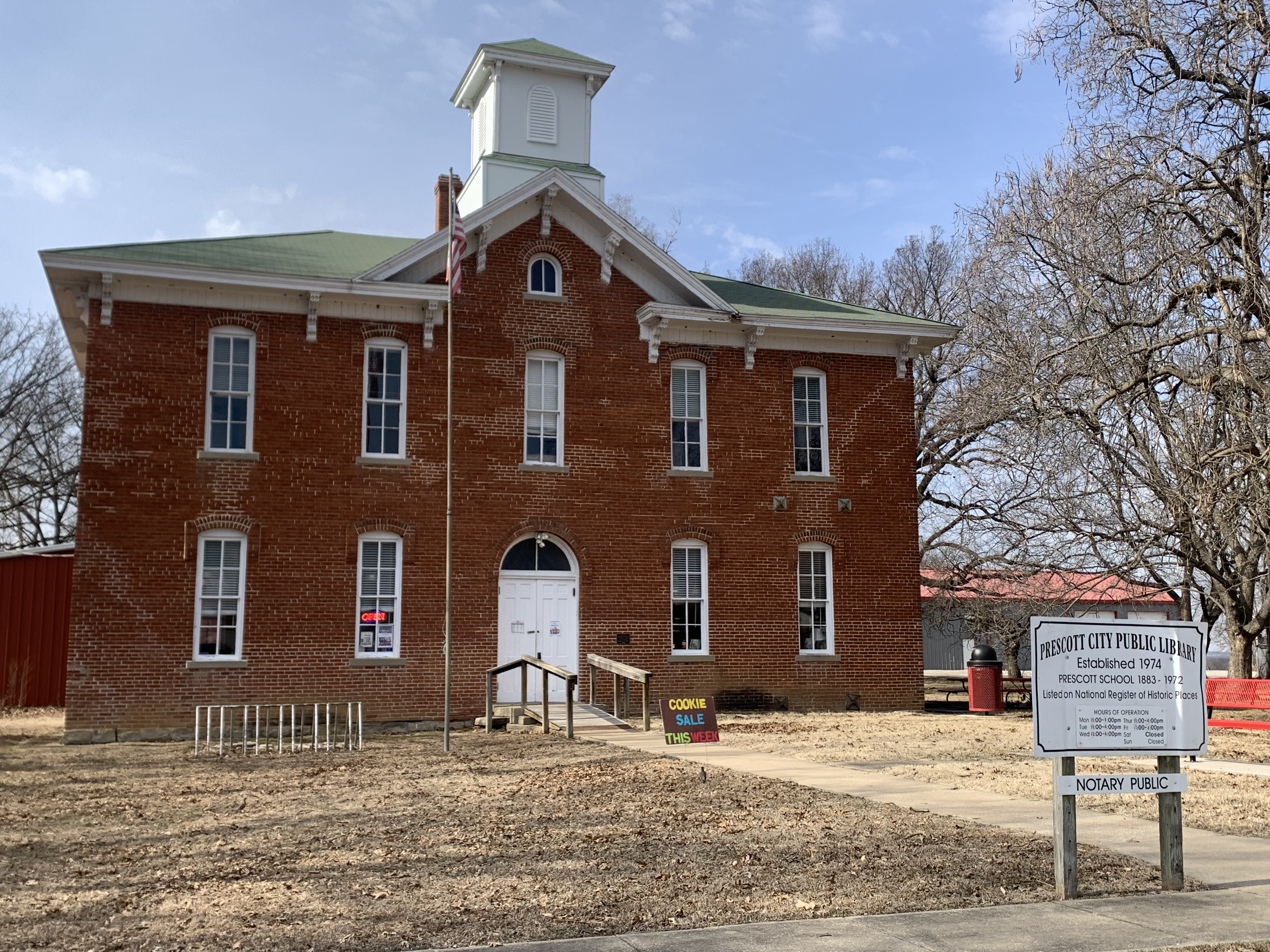
- Prescott School (Prescott City Library) in 2026

- Location within Kansas Location within the United States
- Location: 3rd and Main Sts., Prescott, Kansas
- Coordinates: 38.065278°N 94.698611°W
- Area: 0.2 acres (0.081 ha)
- Built: 1882–83
- Architectural style: Italianate
- NRHP reference No.: 82002664
- Added to NRHP: May 6, 1982

The Prescott School at Third and Main in Prescott in Linn County, Kansas, also known as the Old Prescott School, was built in 1882–83 with Italianate style. It was listed on the National Register of Historic Places in 1982.

It is a two-story brick building, about 55 by 30 feet (16.8 m × 9.1 m) in the plan, on a limestone foundation, with 14 inches (0.36 m) thick walls. The building was wired for electricity in 1924. Its coal-burning stoves were used until 1956 when gas heating was installed. It was modified by the addition of an entry hall in 1949 but that was removed in 1980. It was modified by the relocation and attachment of rural schoolhouses in 1953 and 1958, but those were removed in 1956.

As of 1982, a 1924 high school nearby served as an elementary school.
