= Prescott Town House =

- U.S. National Register of Historic Places
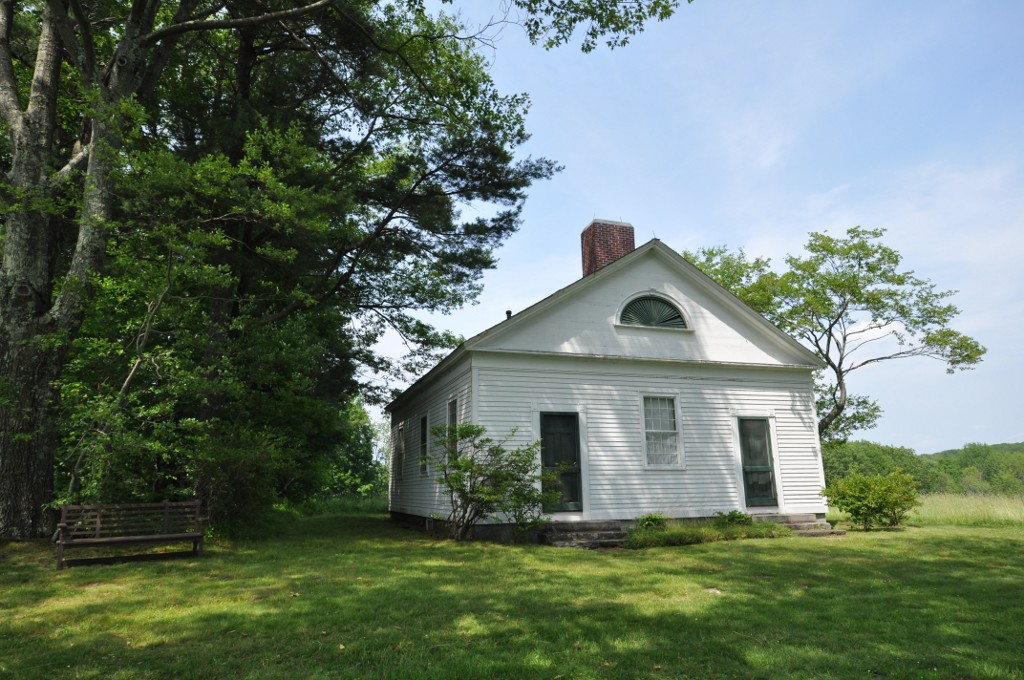

- Location within Massachusetts Location within the United States
- Location: Petersham, Massachusetts
- Coordinates: 42°29′56″N 72°11′1″W
- Built: 1838
- Architect: Sibley, Solomon; Titus, Lucian
- Architectural style: Greek Revival
- NRHP reference No.: 89000043
- Added to NRHP: February 21, 1989

The Prescott Town House is a historic former town hall on MA 32 in Petersham, Massachusetts.

The building was built in 1838 in a Greek Revival style and served as the town hall for Prescott, Massachusetts, a town that was unincorporated in order to make way for the Quabbin Reservoir in the 1930s. The town house was moved to Petersham, where it is now located on a hill above a hay meadow north of the town center. This move was funded by Judge John Monroe Woolsey, who used the building as a law library and office.

The building was listed on the National Register of Historic Places in 1989.

== See also ==
- National Register of Historic Places listings in Worcester County, Massachusetts
