= Prescott, Kansas =

- City
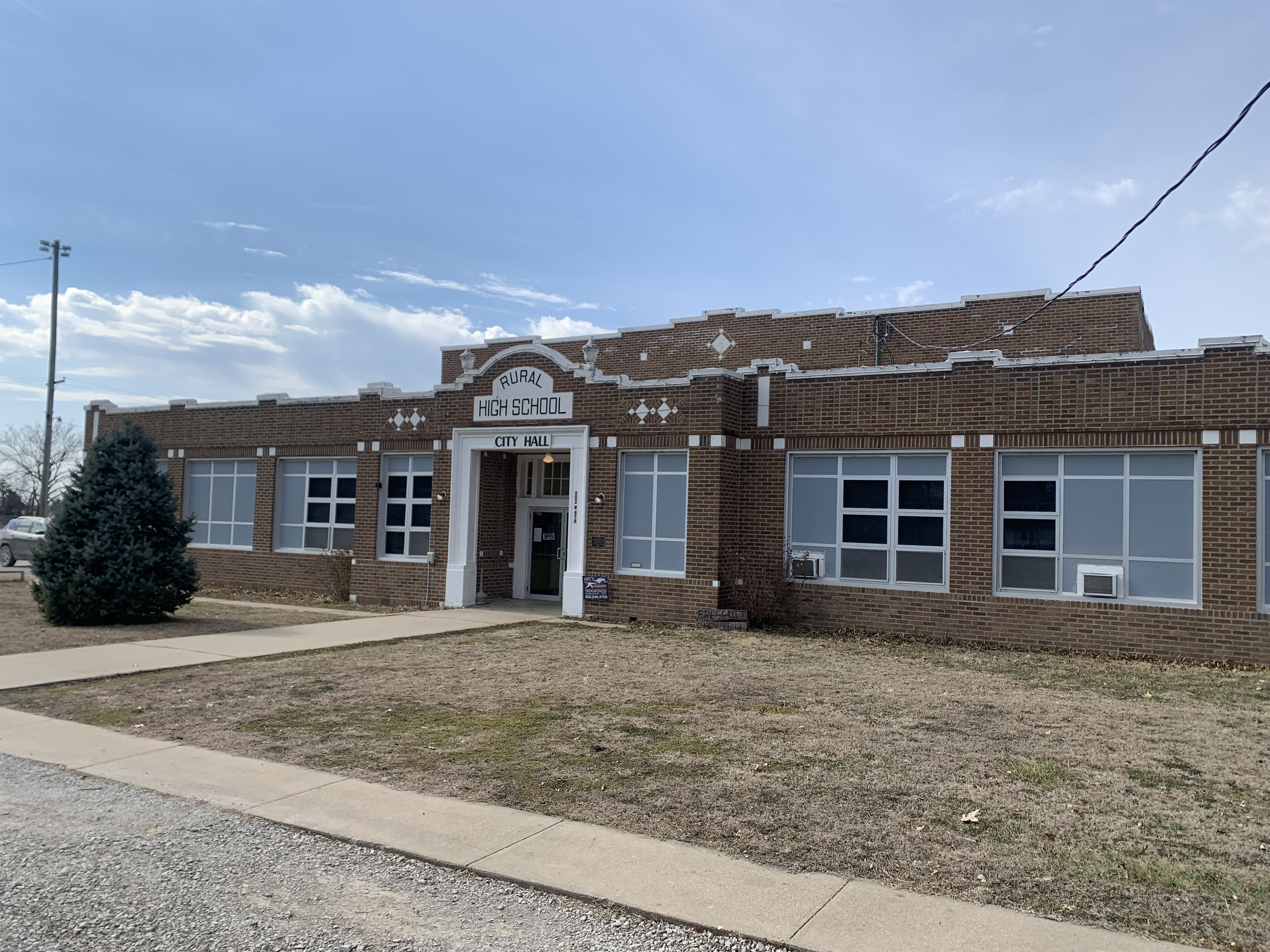
- Prescott City Hall (2026)

- Location within Linn County and Kansas

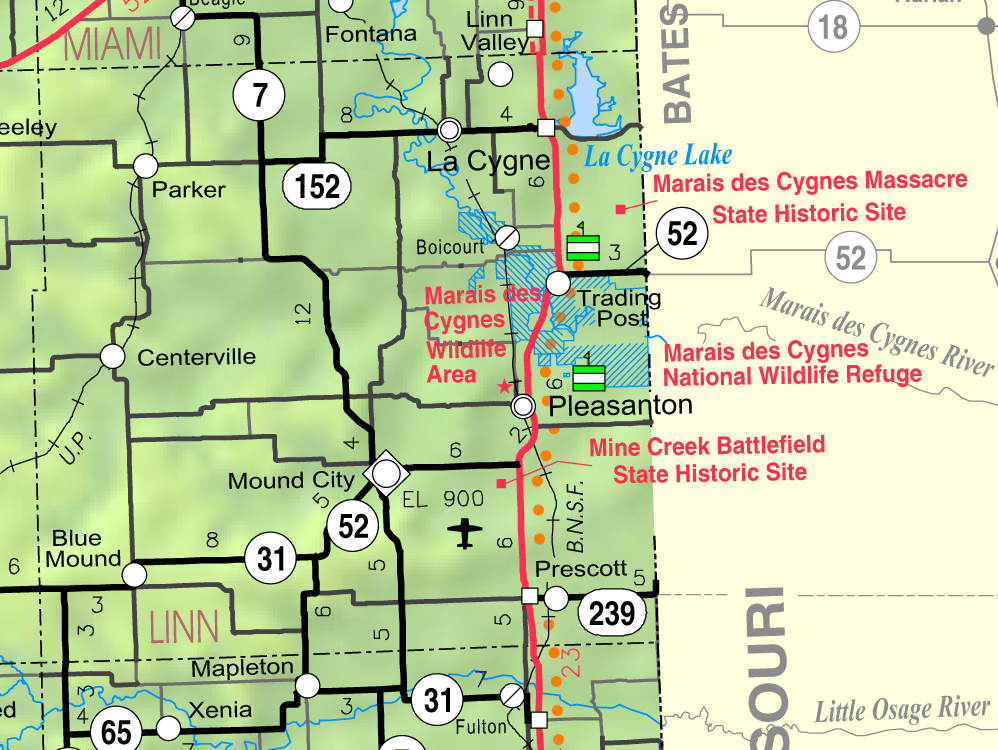
- KDOT map of Linn County (legend)
- Coordinates: 38°03′48″N 94°41′34″W
- Country: United States
- State: Kansas
- County: Linn
- Platted: 1870
- Incorporated: 1870
- Named for: C.H. Prescott

Area
  - Total: 0.31 sq mi (0.79 km^{2})
  - Land: 0.29 sq mi (0.74 km^{2})
  - Water: 0.019 sq mi (0.05 km^{2})
- Elevation: 889 ft (271 m)

Population (2020)
  - Total: 207
  - Density: 720/sq mi (280/km^{2})
- Time zone: UTC-6 (CST)
  - Summer (DST): UTC-5 (CDT)
- ZIP Code: 66767
- Area code: 913
- FIPS code: 20-57650
- GNIS ID: 2396271
- Website: prescottks.us

Prescott is a city in Linn County, Kansas, United States. As of the 2020 census, the population of the city was 207.

== History ==
Prescott was laid out in 1870. It was named for C.H. Prescott, a railroad official.

== Geography ==
According to the United States Census Bureau, the city has a total area of 0.28 square miles (0.73 km^{2}), of which 0.26 square miles (0.67 km^{2}) is land and 0.02 square miles (0.05 km^{2}) is water.

== Demographics ==
Historical population
Census	Pop.	Note	%±
1880	151		—
1890	241		59.6%
1900	298		23.7%
1910	255		−14.4%
1920	291		14.1%
1930	238		−18.2%
1940	277		16.4%
1950	283		2.2%
1960	278		−1.8%
1970	222		−20.1%
1980	319		43.7%
1990	301		−5.6%
2000	280		−7.0%
2010	264		−5.7%
2020	207		−21.6%
U.S. Decennial Census

=== 2020 census ===
The 2020 United States census counted 207 people, 94 households, and 58 families in Prescott. The population density was 726.3 per square mile (280.4/km^{2}). There were 115 housing units at an average density of 403.5 per square mile (155.8/km^{2}). The racial makeup was 92.27% (191) white or European American (91.79% non-Hispanic white), 0.97% (2) black or African-American, 0.97% (2) Native American or Alaska Native, 0.48% (1) Asian, 0.0% (0) Pacific Islander or Native Hawaiian, 0.0% (0) from other races, and 5.31% (11) from two or more races. Hispanic or Latino of any race was 0.97% (2) of the population.

Of the 94 households, 33.0% had children under the age of 18; 44.7% were married couples living together; 25.5% had a female householder with no spouse or partner present. 33.0% of households consisted of individuals and 20.2% had someone living alone who was 65 years of age or older. The average household size was 1.9 and the average family size was 2.9. The percent of those with a bachelor's degree or higher was estimated to be 20.3% of the population.

21.3% of the population was under the age of 18, 6.3% from 18 to 24, 20.8% from 25 to 44, 31.9% from 45 to 64, and 19.8% who were 65 years of age or older. The median age was 48.3 years. For every 100 females, there were 93.5 males. For every 100 females ages 18 and older, there were 98.8 males.

The 2016–2020 5-year American Community Survey estimates show that the median household income was $25,000 (with a margin of error of +/- $9,903) and the median family income was $36,250 (+/- $29,831). Males had a median income of $34,167 (+/- $23,420) versus $16,648 (+/- $1,599) for females. The median income for those above 16 years old was $22,188 (+/- $11,081). Approximately, 31.0% of families and 36.8% of the population were below the poverty line, including 47.2% of those under the age of 18 and 34.8% of those ages 65 or over.

=== 2010 census ===
As of the census of 2010, there were 264 people, 109 households, and 64 families residing in the city. The population density was 1,015.4 inhabitants per square mile (392.0/km^{2}). There were 125 housing units at an average density of 480.8 per square mile (185.6/km^{2}). The racial makeup of the city was 92.4% White, 0.8% African American, 2.3% Native American, 2.7% from other races, and 1.9% from two or more races. Hispanic or Latino of any race were 3.4% of the population.

There were 109 households, of which 19.3% had children under the age of 18 living with them, 47.7% were married couples living together, 5.5% had a female householder with no husband present, 5.5% had a male householder with no wife present, and 41.3% were non-families. 36.7% of all households were made up of individuals, and 15.6% had someone living alone who was 65 years of age or older. The average household size was 2.10 and the average family size was 2.66.

The median age in the city was 49.8 years. 17% of residents were under the age of 18; 5% were between the ages of 18 and 24; 20.1% were from 25 to 44; 28.3% were from 45 to 64; and 29.5% were 65 years of age or older. The gender makeup of the city was 49.2% male and 50.8% female.

== Education ==
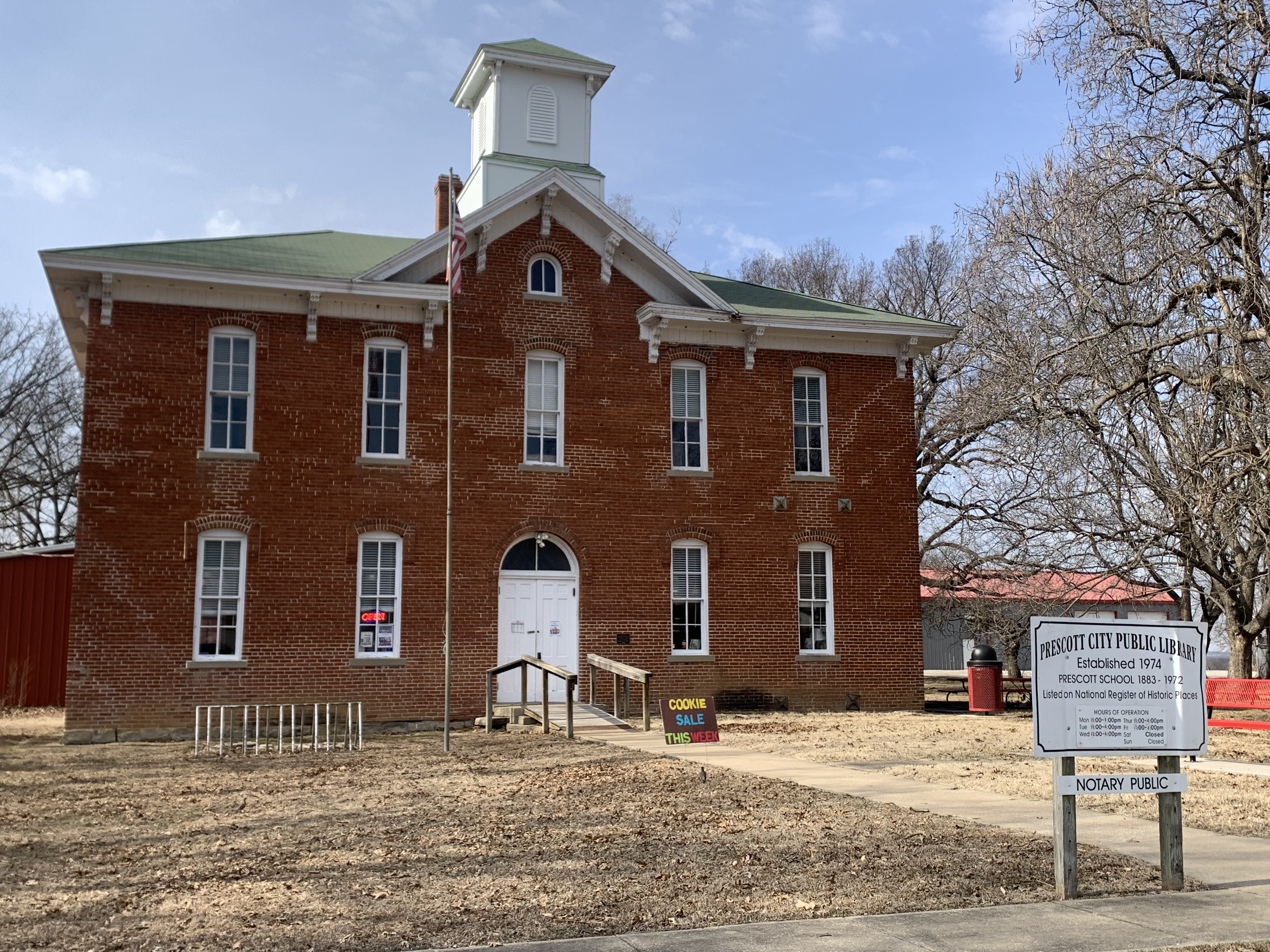
Prescott City Library (2026)

Prescott is served by Jayhawk USD 346. The district high school is Jayhawk-Linn High School.

Prescott High School was closed through school unification. The Prescott High School mascot was Hornets.
