= Goodrich, Kansas =

Unincorporated community in Kansas, U.S.

- Unincorporated community
- Location within Kansas Location within the United States
- Coordinates: 38°17′05″N 94°59′31″W
- Country: United States
- State: Kansas
- County: Linn
- Elevation: 899 ft (274 m)
- Time zone: UTC-6 (CST)
  - Summer (DST): UTC-5 (CDT)
- FIPS code: 20-26925
- GNIS ID: 477676

Goodrich is an unincorporated community in Linn County, Kansas, United States.

== History ==
The post office in Goodrich closed in 1942.
